= Yuri Krapivin =

- Юрий Крапивин

Head of the Federal Protective Service
- In office 19 June 1996 – 18 May 2000
- Preceded by: himself (as head of the Main Directorate of Security)
- Succeeded by: Yevgeny Murov

Main Directorate of Security of Russia
- In office 29 July 1995 – 19 June 1996
- Preceded by: Mikhail Barsukov
- Succeeded by: himself (as head of the Federal Protective Service)

Personal details
- Born: 16 January 1947 Soviet Union
- Died: 30 April 2015 Moscow, Russia
- Resting place: Troyekurovskoye Cemetery
- Education: Moscow State Academy of Physical Culture

Military service
- Allegiance: Russia
- Branch/service: Federal Protective Service
- Rank: Colonel general

Yuri Vasilyevich Krapivin (Russian: Юрий Васильевич Крапивин; January 26, 1947, USSR - April 30, 2015, Moscow, Russia) is a Russian security official who served as head of the Federal Protective Service from 1995 to 2000. He holds the rank of Colonel General.

== Biography ==
He was born in January 1947, according to some sources in Sverdlovsk, according to others - in the Moscow Oblast, по другим — в Московской области in the family of a military man. After school, he graduated from the Moscow Machine-Building College, then worked at a plant. After graduating from the branch of the correspondence department of the Moscow State Academy of Physical Culture in Malakhovk, he served in the Soviet Armed Forces.

In his youth, he was involved in biathlon, competed for Moscow "Dynamo", a student of coach Viktor Nikolaevich Buchin. Master of Sports of the USSR in biathlon, according to other sources - Master of Sports of the USSR of international class, winner of European competitions (1974). In 1971, at the USSR Championship, he won silver medals in the relay as part of the second team of the "Dynamo" society.

After completing his military service in 1972, he joined the KGB as an employee, and was soon enlisted in the military as an officer. He served as a senior officer in the Ninth Chief Directorate KGB under the Council of Ministers of the USSR (protection of senior government and party officials), worked in the commandant's offices of various facilities (buildings of the USSR government).

From October 1983 he served as Head of Department of the 4th Department of the Ninth Chief Directorate. In the period 1986-1991 - Commandant of the Grand Kremlin Palace and the residence of the Commandant's Office of the Moscow Kremlin.

In the fall of 1991, he was appointed Deputy Commandant of the Moscow Kremlin - Commandant of the Commandant's Office for the Protection of the Residence of the President of the Soviet Union and the President of the RSFSR, subordinate to the Security Directorate under the Executive Office of the President of the Soviet Union. Then for two years he was Deputy Commandant of the Moscow Kremlin - Commandant of the Commandant's Office of the Residence of the President of the Russian Federation.

In 1993, he was appointed Deputy Chief, and in July 1995 he served as Chief of the Main Security Directorate of the Russian Federation. On June 19, 1996, the Main Directorate of Security of the Russian Federation, in accordance with the decree of the President of Russia, was renamed the Federal Protective Service of the Russian Federation. The next day, Krapivin was appointed its head and worked in this position until May 18, 2000.

From June to August 1996, after the dismissal of Alexander Korzhakov, he simultaneously served as the acting head of the Presidential Security Service. He was a member of the Security Council Russia from July 1996. From the summer of 1996 to the spring of 1997, he was a member of the Commission on the highest military positions, the highest military and the highest special ranks of the Council on Personnel Policy under the President of the Russian Federation. In 1998 he was promoted to the rank of colonel general.

He died on April 30, 2015. He was buried at the Troyekurovskoye Cemetery in Moscow.

== Awards ==
- Order of Military Merit
- Medal "Veteran of the Armed Forces of the USSR"
- Medal "For Strengthening of Brotherhood in Arms"
- Jubilee Medal "60 Years of the Armed Forces of the USSR"
- Jubilee Medal "70 Years of the Armed Forces of the USSR"
- Medal "For Strengthening Military Cooperation"
- Medal "For Impeccable Service"
- Certificate of Honor of the Government of the Russian Federation
- Master of Sport of the USSR
- Honorary firearms and bladed weapons.
