= Mikhail Barsukov =

KGB/FSB general (born 1947)

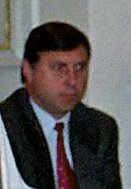
- Barsukov in 1995
- Born: November 8, 1947 (age 78)
- Education: Moscow Higher Military Command School, M. V. Frunze Military Academy
- Awards: Order of the Red Star
- Espionage activity
- Allegiance: Soviet Union / Russia
- Service branch: KGB; FSB
- Rank: Army General
- Operations: Kizlyar-Pervomayskoye hostage crisis

Mikhail Ivanovich Barsukov (Russian: Михаил Иванович Барсуков; born 8 November 1947) is a former Russian intelligence and government official. His most notable post was as the short-lived head of the Federal Security Service of the Russian Federation (FSB) in mid-1990s.

== Early life and education ==
Mikhail Barsukov was born in the city of Lipetsk, the capital of Lipetsk Oblast region in western Russia, the son of Ivan Barsukov, a Soviet Army non-commissioned officer serving as a radio communications operator. In 1955, he began his studies at the Lipetsk School No. 5 and finished high school at the Lipetsk School No. 12. Upon completion of high school studies, Barsukov enrolled in the Moscow Higher Military Command School of the Supreme Soviet of the RSFSR in 1966. He studied tactics, strategy and military leadership for four years, prior to earning a commission as a KGB junior lieutenant in 1970. Barsukov also studied at M. V. Frunze Military Academy sometime during his career, though exact dates are unavailable.

== Career ==
=== Kremlin Regiment of the KGB ===
Barsukov spent the majority of his career moving up through various officer ranks of the Kremlin Regiment, a paramilitary KGB (Ninth Chief Directorate) force responsible for the security of the Soviet seat of political power and the highest levels of political leadership. In 1970 he was assigned to this regiment as a platoon commander, continuing onto higher positions but maintaining the same assignment of security operations in the first sector of Kremlin compound, which housed Senate building. By 1991, Barsukov achieved the position of deputy Commandant of the Kremlin, prior to the complete dissolution of the Soviet Union.

=== Commandant of the Kremlin & Head of Main Administration for Protection (FSO) ===
Barsukov career took a decisive upswing after the establishment of the Russian Federation and Boris Yeltsin's ascent to power as the President of the newly formed country. Barsukov build a relationship with President Yeltsin through his bodyguard, Alexander Korzhakov. In December 1991, he was appointed the Commandant of the Kremlin, and in June 1992, Head of the Main Administration for the Protection of the Russian Federation (GUO).

The GUO replaced the Ninth Directorate of the KGB and took over its responsibility of protecting the country's leadership, a role somewhat analogous to the US Secret Service. Barsukov unequivocally pushed for the service's expansion, and he transformed the GUO into a more capable organization with a personnel increase of 50-100 percent, expanding on the Ninth Directorate's 10,000 person staff. At Barsukov's initiative in 1992, the GUO assumed responsibility for presidential communications, with GUO alone deciding who gets ATS-1 and ATS-2 hot lines.

In 1993, Barsukov displayed loyalty to Yeltsin in the 1993 Russian constitutional crisis, when Yeltsin resorted to force in order to dissolve the Russian legislative body, the Supreme Soviet. During the ten-day crisis, the Russian Armed Forces and security services besieged the legislators by Presidential order. As head of the GUO, Barsukov helped organize the final assault on the Duma. Prior to the assault, Yeltsin transferred temporary control of the Alpha and Vympel special units to Barsukov. Alpha and Vympel were the considered the top Spetsnaz units in Russia, and they subsequently led the assault. He personally ordered several of the defenders of the Supreme Soviet to the isolation cells at the infamous Lefortovo Prison.

=== FSB Director ===
On 19 July 1995, President Yeltsin promoted Barsukov to the rank of Colonel General and appointed him as the head of the KGB's successor agency, the FSB. In August, he became a member of the Security Council of Russia. Rumors circulated in the Russian media that Barsukov intended to return the FSB's organizational structure to resemble the old KGB. Quickly, he promoted confidants close to himself and Alexander Korzhakov, namely head of FSB Director of Counter-Intelligence Viktor Zorin and Deputy Director of the FSB Anatoly Trofimov. Furthermore, Barsukov managed to get the Alpha special unit permanently assigned to the FSB.

While Barsukov's reign as the FSB chief lasted under one year, in this short time he managed to make several significant contributions to Russia's security. In the wake of Chechen terrorism related to the First Chechen War, he established a Counter-Terrorist Center within the FSB's Department for the Protection of the Constitution and Counter-Terrorism. The Alpha unit made up the principal assault and hostage-rescue operational component of the new center.

==== Kizlyar-Pervomayskoye Hostage Crisis ====
On 9 January 1996, a group of several hundred Chechen gunmen under the command of terrorist Salman Raduyev attacked an airfield and hospital in the Russian city of Kizlyar. Using civilian hostages as human shields, the Raduyev's forces attempted to escape toward Chechnya. When they took fire from Russian forces, they stopped in the Russian village of Pervomayskoye, taking hostages at a mosque and local schools. Western media called the event the Kizlyar-Pervomayskoye hostage crisis. Barsukov immediately took control of the operational headquarters handling the crisis. Reportedly, Baruskov and Interior Minister Anatoly Kulikov declared (incorrectly) that the terrorists had executed the hostages inside the village, and authorized soldiers to use Grad rockets to bombard the village.

=== Election Fraud Scandal & Firing from FSB ===
On 19 June 1996, Yeltsin's re-election campaign managers Sergei Lisovsky and Arkady Yevstafyev, were arrested while leaving the White House of Russia. This began the so-called Xerox Affair, where security agents detained the campaigners at the behest of Barsukov and Alexander Korzhakov, discovering $500,000 in a copy-paper box carried by one of the men. Eager to distance himself from a corruption investigation during the election campaign period, Yeltsin fired Barsukov and Korzhakov, along with their staunch ally First Deputy Prime Minister Oleg Soskovets. Deputy director of the FSB Nikolai Kovalyov replaced Barsukov, who had served less a year as the head of the agency. Barsukov remained jobless until the fall of 1997.

=== Post-Intelligence Career ===
In September 1997, Yeltsin appointed Barsukov as head of the Presidential Administration's Directorate for Special Installation (formerly the Fifteenth Directorate of the KGB). Furthermore, in December 1998, Barsukov gained a more important post, as the head of the Chief Director for Military Inspection subordinate to the Security Council of Russia, later became the head of the Interdepartmental Commission on Underground Structures of the Security Council of the Russian Federation His current job remains unknown.

== Honours and awards ==
- Order of the Red Star
- Jubilee Medal "In Commemoration of the 100th Anniversary since the Birth of Vladimir Il'ich Lenin"
- Medal "Veteran of the Armed Forces of the USSR"
- Jubilee Medal "50 Years of the Armed Forces of the USSR"
- Jubilee Medal "60 Years of the Armed Forces of the USSR"
- Jubilee Medal "70 Years of the Armed Forces of the USSR"
- Medal "For Impeccable Service" 1st, 2nd and 3rd classes

Preceded by Sergei Stepashin	Director of FSK/FSB; 1995 — 1996	Succeeded by Nikolay Kovalyov
