= Karakulov =

Karakulov (Russian: Каракулов) is a masculine surname, its feminine counterpart is Karakulova. Notable people with the surname include:

- Gleb Karakulov (born 1987), former captain of the Russian Federal Protective Service who defected in 2022
- Kuanysh Karakulov (born 1977), Kazakhstani football player
- Kaidar Karakulov (born 1974), Kazakh general, a commander of the Kazakh Ground Forces
- Amir Karakulov (born 1965), Kazakh director and writer
- Amir Karakulov (Qaroqulov), Tadjik politician
- Nikolay Karakulov (1918–1988), Soviet sprinter
