= Presidential Band of the Russian Federation =

- Президентский оркестр Российской Федерации
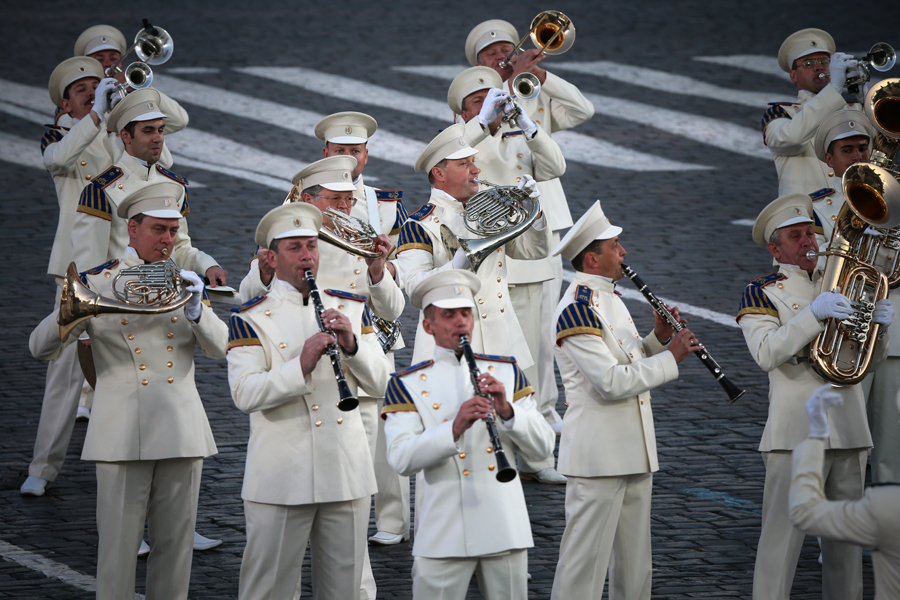
- Active: September 11, 1938 – present
- Country: Russia
- Branch: Federal Protective Service
- Type: Military Band
- Part of: Commandant's Office of the Moscow Kremlin
- Garrison/HQ: Moscow

Commanders
- Current commander: Colonel Vera Krylova

The Presidential Band of the Commandant's Office of the Moscow Kremlin of the Federal Protective Service of the Russian Federation (Russian: Президентский оркестр Службы коменданта Московского Кремля Федеральной службы охраны Российской Федерации) shortened to the Presidential Band of the Russian Federation (Президентский оркестр Российской Федерации) is a special military unit that is the official military band for the president of Russia. It is the main band that plays at official ceremonies and receptions for high-ranking officials that visit Russia, including heads of state, heads of government, and diplomatic delegations. Although it is not an official military unit, it is affiliated with the Military Band Service of the Armed Forces of Russia. Unlike the Special Exemplary Military Band of the Guard of Honor Battalion of Russia, which shares a similar role, the Presidential Band is the official band of the president of Russia and is based in the Kremlin.

== History ==
The Presidential Band of the Kremlin Regiment of Russia was established in September 1938, being originally named the Moscow Kremlin Commandant's Band, for many years assigned as the official band of the Soviet KGB at state events. On January 11, 1993, Russian president Boris Yeltsin ordered the band to be renamed to its current title.

The band has given more than 700 performances in the Grand Kremlin Palace, as well as foreign theaters such as, the Kennedy Center, Madison Square Garden, the Rome Opera, and the Friedrichstadt Palace.

== List of conductors ==
- N.V. Mirov (1936–1938)
- I.M. Peregudov (1938-1942)
- V.S. Dalekiy (1942–1957)
- V.P. Udalov (1968–1969)
- G.D. Smushchenko (1957–1968)
- N.A. Zolotarev (1969-1972)
- V.L. Ivanov (1972–1996)
- P.B. Ovsyannikov (1996–2004)
- A.N. Orlov (2004–2010)
- V.A. Krylova (2010–2023)
- E.U. Nikitin (2023)

== Events ==
The Fanfare of President of the Russian Federation.

The Presidential Band plays at various events that usually tailored to the Kremlin's ceremonial needs. It has performed on the following occasions in Russia and foreign countries.

- Spasskaya Tower Military Music Festival and Tattoo
- Inauguration of the Russian president
- Bolshoi Theater
- State arrival ceremonies in the Grand Kremlin Palace

The band was awarded the following accolades:

- Lenin Komsomol Prize (1982) - For its great work in the education of youth and its high performing skills
