= Put Domoi (movement) =

Russian movement of relatives of mobilized soldiers

Put’ Domoi (Russian: Путь домой, literally “The Way Home”) is a Russian protest movement formed mainly by the wives and mothers of men mobilized to fight in the Russian invasion of Ukraine. The movement emerged in 2023, after many reservists called up during Russia’s partial mobilization of September 2022 had spent extended periods at the front without a clear date for their return.

The movement demands that mobilized reservists be discharged and allowed to return permanently to their families. Its supporters have organized petitions, public appeals and small demonstrations. At a series of gatherings in Moscow, participants laid flowers at the Tomb of the Unknown Soldier near the Kremlin and called for mobilized men to be replaced by professional contract soldiers.

Put’ Domoi did not initially present itself as a conventional anti-war movement. Some of its members originally expressed support for the Russian government’s stated war aims or avoided directly criticizing the invasion. However, the authorities’ refusal to establish a system of rotation or demobilization led some participants, including prominent activist Maria Andreyeva, to become increasingly critical of the Kremlin and its treatment of mobilized soldiers and their families.

The demonstrations were unusual in Russia, where public criticism of the invasion and unauthorized anti-government protests have been heavily restricted. Journalists and other participants were detained during a Put’ Domoi gathering in Moscow in February 2024.

On 31 May 2024, the Russian Ministry of Justice designated Put’ Domoi and Andreyeva as “foreign agents”. The designation placed additional legal and administrative restrictions on the movement and was described by the Associated Press as part of the Russian authorities’ broader crackdown on dissent. Despite the designation, relatives of mobilized soldiers continued to stage small protests demanding their return and limits on the length of military service.
