= Federal Protective Service (Russia) =

Russian federal law enforcement agency concerned with protection of state officials

Federal Guard Service of Russia Федеральная служба охраны России
- Emblem of the Federal Guard Service

- Flag of the Federal Guard Service
- Common name: Federal Guard Service
- Abbreviation: FSO
- Motto: ФСО

Agency overview
- Formed: 27 May 1996; 30 years ago
- Preceding agency: Glavnoye Upravlenie Okhrani (GUO)
- Employees: Classified (50,000 estimated)
- Annual budget: Classified

Jurisdictional structure
- Federal agency (Operations jurisdiction): Russia
- Operations jurisdiction: Russia
- Legal jurisdiction: Throughout Russia and its Republics
- Governing body: Presidential Administration of Russia
- Constituting instrument: Law On State Protection
- General nature: Federal law enforcement
- Specialist jurisdiction: Protection of international or domestic VIPs, protection of significant state assets

Operational structure
- Headquarters: Moscow Kremlin
- Sworn members: Classified
- Agency executive: General Dmitry Kochnev, Director
- Parent agency: Presidential Administration of Russia
- Child agency: Presidential Security Service

Website
- www.fso.gov.ru

The Federal Guard Service of the Russian Federation (Russian: Федеральная служба охраны Российской Федерации, IPA: [fʲɪdʲɪˈralʲnəjə ˈsluʐbə ɐˈxranɨ rɐˈsʲijskəj fʲɪdʲɪˈratsɨɪ] (Federal'naya sluzhba okhrany Rossiyskoy Federatsii)), also known as the FGS of Russia (Russian: ФСО России, IPA: [ɛf ɛs ˌo rɐˈsʲiɪ]), is a federal government agency concerned with the tasks related to the protection of several high-ranking state officials, mandated by the relevant law, including the president of Russia, as well as certain federal properties. It traces its origin to the USSR's Ninth Chief Directorate of the KGB and later Presidential Security Service (SBP) led by KGB general Alexander Korzhakov.

On May 27, 1996, the law "On State Protection" reorganized the GUO (Glavnoye Upravlenie Okhrani) into the FSO (Federal Protection Service). Under article 7 of the law, "the President of the Russian Federation, while in office, shall not be allowed to forego state protection."

The FSO includes an estimated 50,000 troops and controls the Russian nuclear briefcase (Cheget) that can be used in the event of nuclear war. It reportedly uses advanced domestic technical developments.

== Structure and command ==
Since May 18, 2000, and until May 26, 2016, the agency was headed by General Evgeny Murov; since May 26, 2016, the head of the service is General Dmitry Kochnev. The FSO has roughly 50,000 uniformed personnel plus several thousand plain-clothed personnel. It controls the Cheget that can be used in the event of a global nuclear war. It also operates a secure communications system for senior government officials. The FSO is a powerful institution with a range of rights and powers, including the right to conduct searches and surveillance without warrants, make arrests, and give orders to other state agencies.

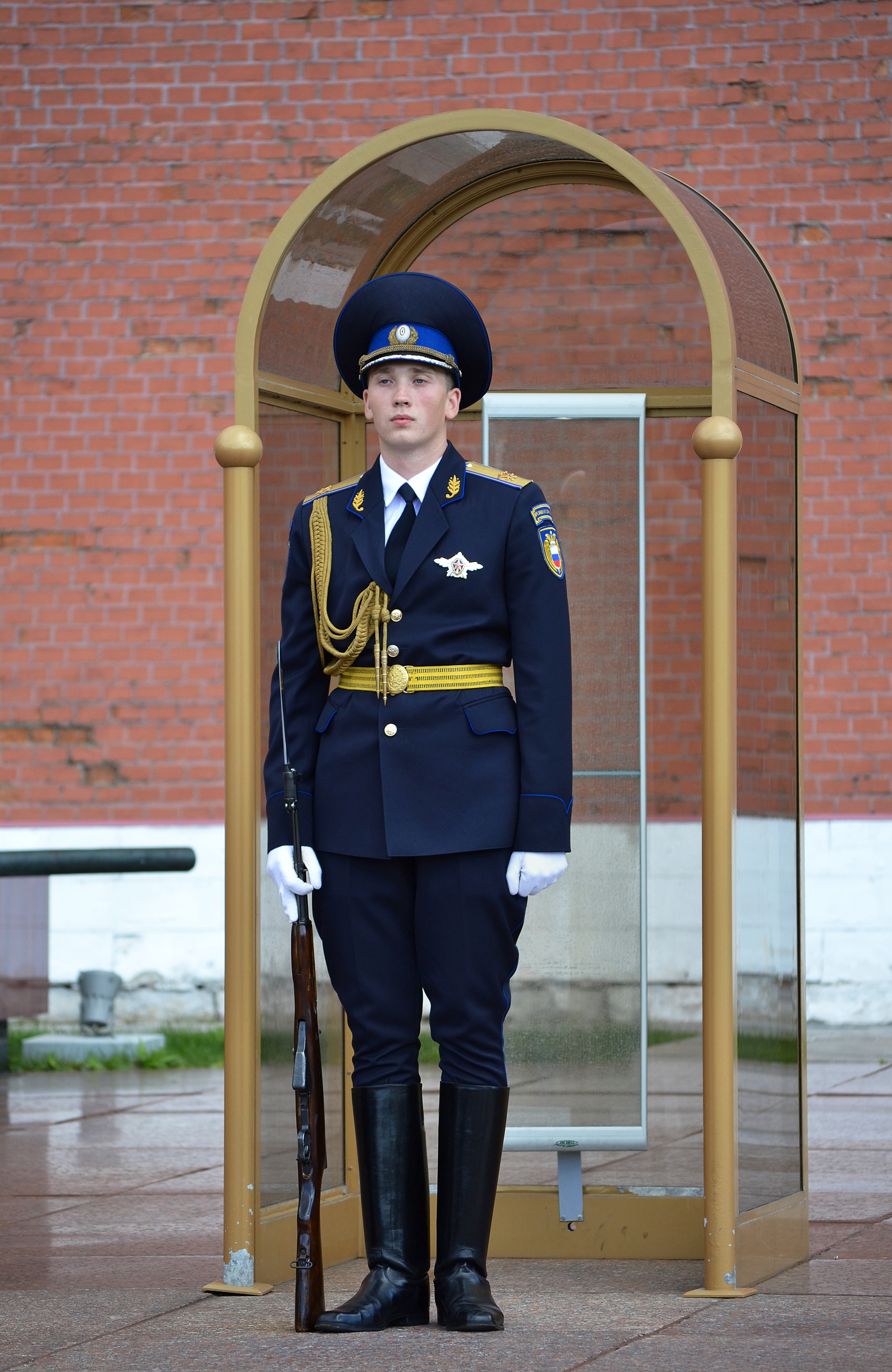
A soldier of the Kremlin Regiment in a full dress uniform at Post No. 1 (Tomb of the Unknown Soldier).

The FSO is organized into the following services:

- Management (Director, Deputies)
- Presidential Security Service
- Security Service
- Commandant's Office of the Moscow Kremlin
  - Kremlin Regiment
    - Regiment HQ
    - Presidential Band of the Russian Federation
    - 1st Battalion
    - 2nd Battalion
    - 3rd Battalion
    - Presidential Cavalry Escort Battalion
    - 4th Operational Reserve Battalion
- Special Communications Service of Russia
- Engineering Support Service
- Housekeeping Service
  - Special Purpose Garage
- Administrative service
- Security service in the North-West Federal District (St. Petersburg)
- Security service in the Caucasus (Sochi)
- Security service in Crimea (Simferopol)
- Office of central subordination
- Units of the FSO at official residences
- Office of Special Communications and Information in the Federal Districts
  - Centers of special communications and information
- Special communications centers
- Educational and research institutions, federal unitary enterprises
  - Academy of the Federal Security Service of Russia (Oryol)
- Public Relations Center

One of the FSO units is the Kremlin Regiment. A more recent addition to the FSO infrastructure is the Special Communications Service of Russia (Spetsviaz) which was incorporated as a structural sub unit on August 7, 2004.

== History of the federal protective services ==
- Special department by VChK College
- Special department of GPU
- Special department by OGPU College – Dec 1929
- 5th department (special safeguard) of Operod, SOU OGPU, Jan 1930 – Mar 1931
- 5th department (special safeguard) of Operod, SOU OGPU, Mar–Jun 1931
- 4th department of Operod, OGPU, Jun 1931
- Operod of OGPU
- Operative division (Operod) of GUGB NKVD USSR, Jul 1934 – Nov 1936
- Division of safeguard by GUGB NKVD USSR, Dec 1936 – Jun 1938
- Department of Moscow Kremlin's commandant, NKVD USSR
- 1st division of 1st Department by NKVD USSR, Jun–Sep 1938
- 1st division of GUGB
- 1st division of NKGB
- Department of Moscow Kremlin's commandant, NKGB USSR
- 1st division of NKVD
- Department of Moscow Kremlin's commandant, NKVD USSR
- Sixth department of NKGB USSR, Apr 1943 – Mar 1946
- Department of Moscow Kremlin's commandant, NKGB USSR
- Sixth department of MGB USSR, Mar–Apr 1946
- Department of safeguard No. 1, MGB, Apr–Dec 1946
- Department of safeguard No. 2, MGB, Apr–Dec 1946
- Department of Moscow Kremlin's commandant, MGB USSR, Dec 1946
- Headquarters of safeguard, MGB USSR, Dec 1946 – May 1952
- Department of safeguard, MGB, May 1952
- Ninth department of MVD USSR, Mar 1953 – Mar 1954
- Tenth department of MVD USSR, Mar 1953 – Mar 1954
- Ninth department of KGB by SM USSR, Mar 1954 –
- Tenth department of KGB by SM USSR, Mar 1954 –
- Fifteenth department of KGB by SM USSR
- Ninth department of KGB USSR
- Fifteenth department of KGB USSR
- Service of safeguard, KGB USSR
- Department of safeguard by USSR President
- Main Administration of Protection (GUO – Glavnoye Upravlenie Okhrani) (1992–1996)
- Federal Protective Service (FSO) (1996–today)

== List of leaders ==
=== Heads of the GUO/Directors of the FSO ===
- Vladimir Redkoborody (1991 – June 1992)
- Mikhail Barsukov (12 June 1992 – 24 July 1995)
- Yuri Krapivin (24 July 1995 – 18 May 2000)
- Yevgeny Murov (18 May 2000 – 26 May 2016)
- General Dmitry Kochnev (since 26 May 2016)

=== Deputy Directors of the FSO ===
- Oleg Klimentyev (First Deputy Director since 2015)
- Vladimir Belanovsky – Head of the Services of Special Communications and Information
- Alexey Rubezhnoy – Head of the Presidential Security Service
- Victor Tulupov
- Major General Sergey Udovenko – Commandant of the Moscow Kremlin

== Prominent defectors ==
- Gleb Karakulov (engineer in field unit of FSO presidential communications department)

== See also ==
- Presidential Security Service (SBP)
- Federal Security Service (FSB)
- Kremlin Regiment
- Spetssvyaz
- FAPSI
- Awards of the Federal Protective Service of the Russian Federation
- U.S. Secret Service
- Household Division
