= Gennady Bashkin =

Soviet military officer (1931–2015)

- Геннадий Башкин
- Born: September 4, 1931; Ozinki, Russian SFSR, Soviet Union
- Died: 19 January 2015 (aged 83)
- Education: Moscow Machine-Tool Institute
- Military career
- Allegiance: Soviet Union
- Branch: KGB
- Rank: Major General
- Commands: Commandant's Office of the Moscow Kremlin
- Awards: USSR State Prize; Order of the Patriotic War; Order of the Red Star; Order of the Badge of Honour; Jubilee Medal "In Commemoration of the 100th Anniversary of the Birth of Vladimir Ilyich Lenin"

Gennady Dementievich Bashkin (Russian: Геннадий Дементьевич Башкин; September 4, 1931 – January 19, 2015) was a Soviet military officer with the rank of Major General who served as the chief of security for Soviet leadership in the 9th Directorate of the KGB. From September 1986 to August 1991 he served as the deputy director of the directorate and as the Commandant of the Moscow Kremlin.

== Biography ==
He was called up for service in the MGB troops, served in the 215th rifle regiment, stationed in Rogatin, as part of the 82nd Rifle Division of the UVV MGB of the Ukrainian Military District. From May 19, 1951, a private in the special purpose regiment of the UKMK MGB. In 1954, he graduated from a military school, served in the PSN KGB in officer positions. From 1959 in the 9th Directorate of the KGB, department instructor, officer of the service and combat training department.

He graduated from the Moscow Machine-Tool Institute, after which he held the positions of deputy commandant of the Lenin Mausoleum of the Commandant's Office of the Moscow Kremlin from 1972. He served as Commandant of the Mausoleum from 1981 until 1985.

From 1985 to 1986 he served as deputy Chief of the 9th Directorate of the KGB, Chief of the Service and Combat Training Department. From September 11, 1986, to August 22, 1991, Deputy Chief of the 9th Directorate of the KGB of the USSR and Commandant of the Moscow Kremlin.

Following the 1991 Soviet coup attempt he served as acting Chief of the Security Department of the Presidential Administration of the USSR from August 22 to 31, 1991. He retired in 1992.
