= Presidential Security Service (Russia) =

Russian federal government agency

Presidential Security Service of Russia Служба безопасности президента России
- Common name: Presidential Security Service
- Abbreviation: SBP

Agency overview
- Formed: November 1993; 33 years ago
- Preceding agency: Ninth Chief Directorate (KGB)
- Employees: 2,500
- Annual budget: Classified

Jurisdictional structure
- Federal agency: Russia
- Operations jurisdiction: Russia
- Governing body: Federal Protective Service (Russia)
- Constituting instrument: Law On State Protection
- General nature: Federal law enforcement

Operational structure
- Headquarters: The Kremlin, Moscow
- Agency executive: Alexey Rubezhnoy, Commander
- Parent agency: Federal Protective Service, FSO
- Child agency: Psychological Analysis Directorate

Notables
- Anniversary: November 11

The Presidential Security Service (SBP) (Russian: Служба безопасности президента России) is a federal government agency concerned with the tasks related to the protection of the President of Russia and the Prime Minister of Russia with their respective families and residences. It traces its origin to the USSR's Ninth Chief Directorate of the KGB.

== History ==
The SBP was founded by Boris Yeltsin in November 1993, headed by Aleksandr Korzhakov, a general of the KGB.

== Structure and command ==
From 2000 to 2013, the position of the head of the Presidential Protection Service was held by the General Viktor Zolotov.

The agency had about 2,500 personnel in 2007, as suggested by a publication in the Western press.

The Psychological Security Department is the branch of the Presidential Security Service that is responsible for analyzing intelligence about threats to the life of the president. The Department operates a panel of experts from several intelligence services, such as GRU, FSB, and SVR.

== Heads of Presidential Security Service ==
- Alexander Korzhakov (1991–1996)
- Yuri Krapivin (1996)
- Anatoly Kuznetsov (1996–2000)
- Viktor Zolotov (May 18, 2000 – September 2013)
- Oleg Klementiyev (September 2013 – June 2015)
- Dmitry Kochnev (June 2015 – May 2016)
- Alexey Rubezhnoy (since June 2016)

== See also ==
- Kremlin Regiment
