= Shtyki Memorial =

Coordinates: 56°00′53″N 37°12′30″E

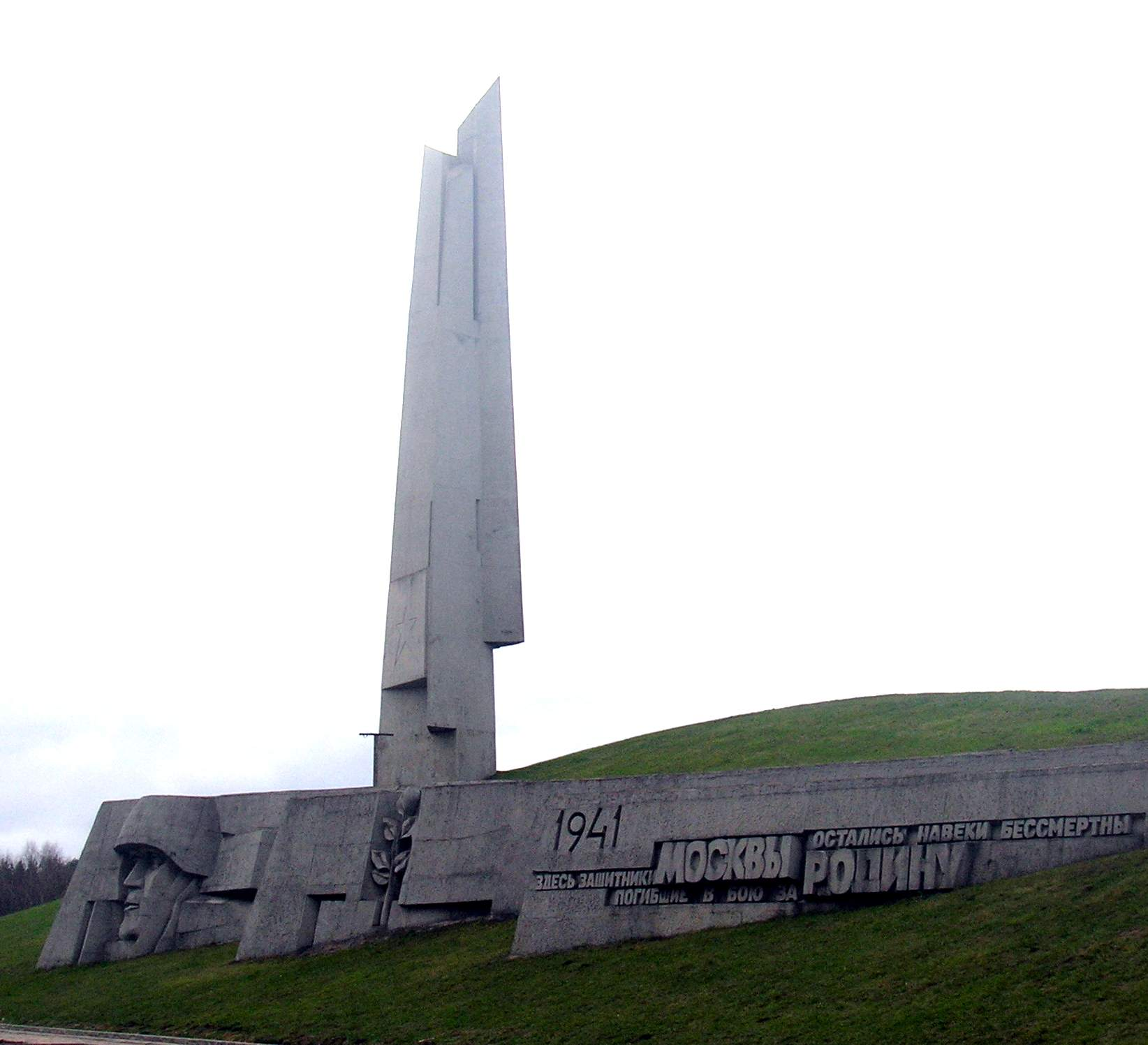
The Shtyki Memorial complex

The Shtyki Memorial (Russian: Мемориальный комплекс «Штыки», lit. bayonets), also named the Monument to the Defenders of Moscow (памятник Защитникам Москвы), is a memorial complex in honour of those who defended Russia in the Battle of Moscow. At the site are a common grave and an architectural complex. It is located on the 40th km of Leningrad highway, at the second entry into the city of Zelenograd heading south, and the road to Mendeleyevo heading north. The memorial complex obtained its name because of the central obelisk, which represents the stylized image of three bayonets held together. The first burials in the common grave were in the winter of 1941; the architectural features were completed on 24 June 1974. The architects of the project were I. A. Pokrovsky, and Y. A. Sverdlovsky, with sculptors A. G. Shteyman, and E. A. Shteyman-Derevyanko.

== Components ==
The complex is composed of a kurgan, the Shtyki obelisk, and a bas-relief triptych with inscriptions. The kurgan contains the common grave known as Hill of Glory (Russian: Холм Славы), which rises to a height of 27 meters. The Shtyki obelisk is composed of three stylized bayonets that symbolize the rifle, tank and cavalry divisions. It is made of reinforced concrete and has a height of 42 meters from the apex of the barrow. The bas-relief triptych is on the southwestern side of the kurgan. Sculpted into three concrete stele are reliefs depicting a soldier in the helmet, a laurel branch, and the inscription: "1941 г. Здесь защитники Москвы, погибшие в бою за Родину, остались навеки бессмертны" in English: "1941 Here the defenders of Moscow, fallen in battle for the Motherland, remain forever immortal." Under the bronze wreath rest the ashes of hundreds of Soviet soldiers. On the wreath is inscribed: "Никогда Родина-мать не забудет своих сыновей" in English: "Never will the Motherland forget her sons".

== Connections with other monuments ==
The Shtyki Memorial is connected with other monuments, particularly the Tomb of the Unknown Soldier at the wall of the Moscow Kremlin, and the Kurgan of Glory in Minsk. On 3 December 1966, in the commemoration of the 25 summer anniversary of the defeat of Hitler's troops in the environs of Moscow, ashes of the soldiers were carried to the Kremlin. The Shtyki complex is sometimes confused with the Belarusian Kurgan of Glory complex due to their similarities. Both are memorial complexes built on kurgans. Zelenograd's memorial has 3 "bayonets", and the Belarusian memorial has 4. The names of the memorial mounds are also similar, where Zelenograd has the name "Hill of Glory", and the Belarusian "Kurgan of Glory".

== Flag and coat of arms of Zelenograd ==
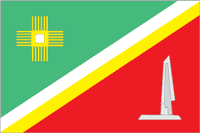
The Flag of Zelenograd

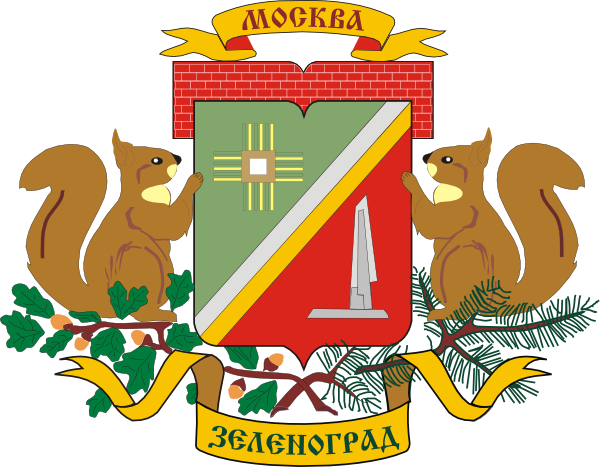
The Coat of arms of Zelenograd

The monument has become an element of the flag of the city of Zelenograd, which is incorporated into the city's coat of arms. A stylized drawing of the monument in silver or white is displayed on the flag which is in turn displayed on the center shield of the coat of arms. It is on a red background in the lower right portion of the flag, which is divided into two portions by a gold and silver diagonal. On these two emblems the monument symbolizes the important boundary in the defense of the capital, and the beginning of the defeat of Hitler's troops in the environs of Moscow in 1941. Opposite the monument on the flag is a stylized golden image of a microchip in the form of an equilateral cross.
