= Dmitry Kochnev =

Russian civil servant

- Дмитрий Кочнев
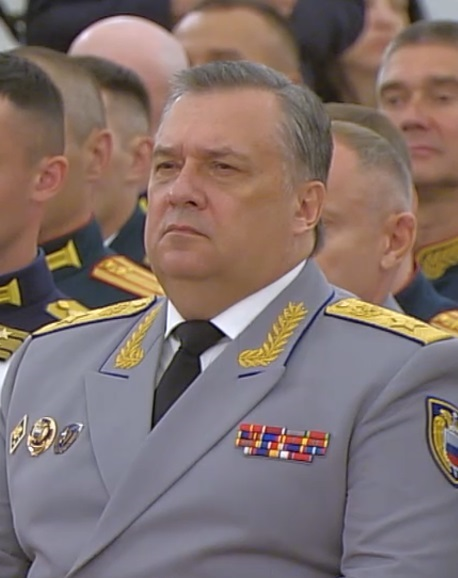
- Kochnev in 2022

Director of the Federal Protective Service
- Incumbent
- Assumed office 26 May 2016

Head of the Presidential Security Service
- In office 30 June 2015 – 26 May 2016
- Preceded by: Oleg Klimentiev
- Succeeded by: Alexey Rubezhnoy

Personal details
- Born: Dmitry Viktorovich Kochnev; 1 March 1964 (age 62) Moscow, Russian SFSR, Soviet Union
- Spouse: Marina Vladimirovna Medvedev
- Children: 1

Military service
- Years of service: 1982–present
- Rank: Army general

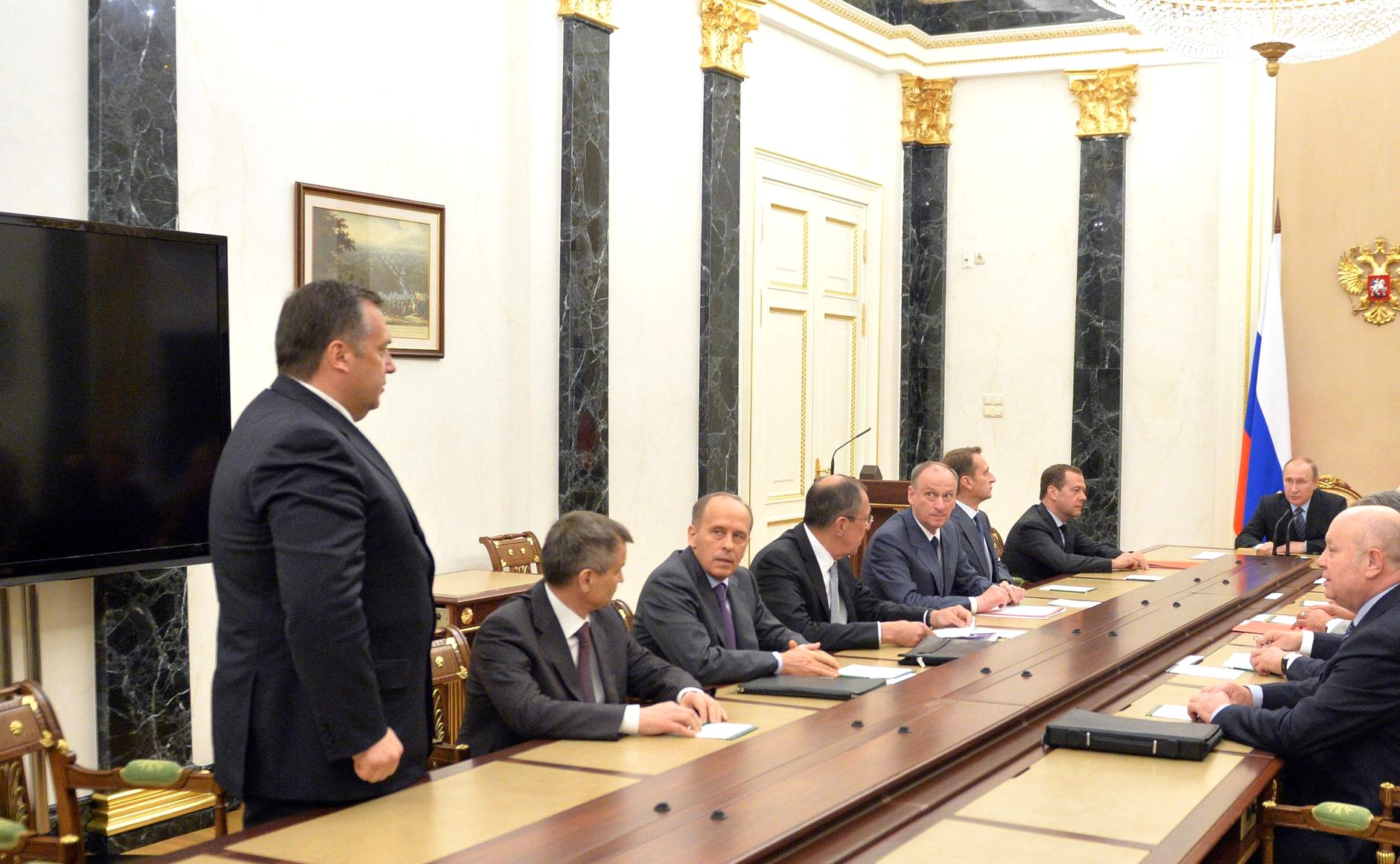
Kochnev speaking at a meeting of the Security Council in 2016

Dmitry Viktorovich Kochnev (Russian: Дми́трий Ви́кторович Ко́чнев; born 1 March 1964) is a Russian army general. From June 2015 to May 2016, he was the head of the Russian Presidential Security Service and as acting head from June to December 2015. Since 26 May 2016, he has been the Director of the Federal Protective Service. He was promoted to the rank of army general in early June 2021.
