= Post No. 1 =

Post No. 1 Пост № 1
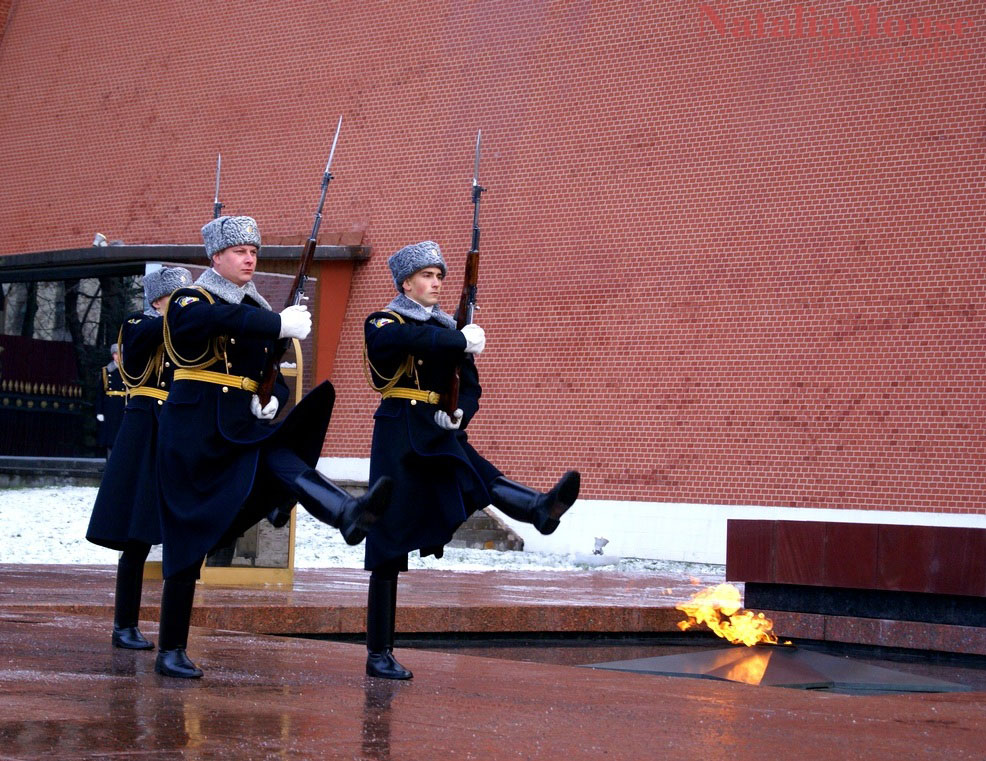
- Post No. 1 Honour guard at the Eternal Flame at the Tomb of the Unknown Soldier in Moscow

- Location in Central Moscow Location in Russia Location in Europe
- 55°45′18″N 37°36′58″E
- Location: Moscow, Russia

History
- Built: 1924

Site notes
- Governing body: Presidential Security Service

The Honor Guard Post at the Eternal Flame at the Tomb of the Unknown Soldier near the walls of the Moscow Kremlin (Russian: Пост Почётного караула у Вечного огня на Могиле Неизвестного Солдата у стен Московского Кремля) also known as Post No. 1 Russian: Пост № 1) is the main guard post in Russia. It was established and installed near Lenin's Mausoleum in 1924 after the death of Vladimir Lenin. In 1993, by decree of the President of Russia, Boris Yeltsin, Post No. 1 was abolished, and in 1997 it was restored in the Alexander Garden near the Tomb of the Unknown Soldier. Guard duty is performed by servicemen of the Presidential Regiment.

== History ==
=== Background ===
A detailed ceremony for changing the guard of honour was developed during the reign of Paul I and was used until the beginning of the 20th century. Under Paul I, the troops were given Prussian-style uniforms, the army was retrained in new drill formations, and the usual ceremony of the guard parade (mounting the guard) turned into an important state matter with the obligatory participation of the emperor or his heir.

During the Imperial Russia period, the changing of the guard took place on the square in front of the Saints Peter and Paul Cathedral in St. Petersburg or in Peterhof, depending on where the emperor was.

=== Mausoleum Guard ===
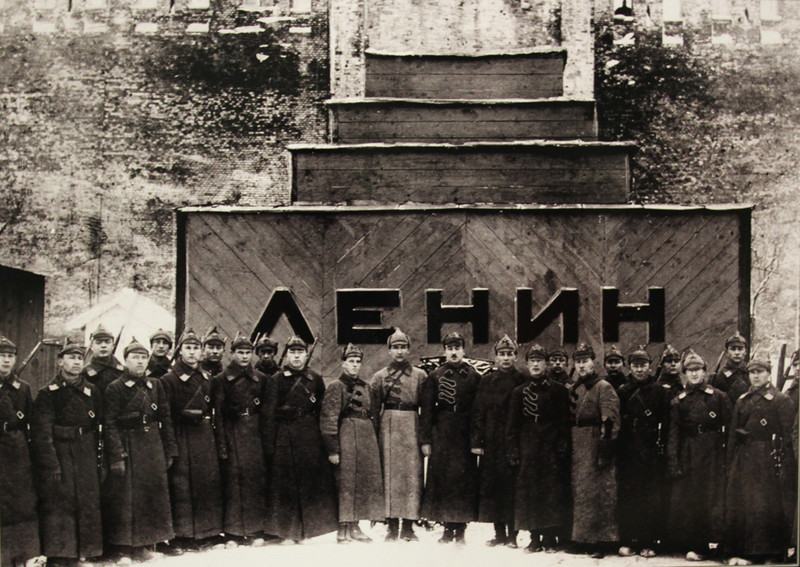
Guard of the 1st Soviet United Military School of the Red Army named after the All-Russian Central Executive Committee for the protection of the temporary Lenin Mausoleum, 1924

After the death of Vladimir Lenin, the first to organize a guard at his body were volunteers: peasants living near Moscow, and later - workers of the capital and delegates of the XI All-Russian Congress of Soviets.

The honor guard was officially established by the order of the head of the Moscow garrison Nikolai Muralov on January 26, 1924. The guard was located at a temporary wooden mausoleum, built according to the design of the architect Alexey Shchusev a few days after Lenin's death. Since Lenin was an honorary red commander of the All-Russian Central Executive Committee Military School, the guard was carried out by cadets of this school.

On January 27, 1924 at 16:00, Grigory Koblov and Arsenty Kashkin were the first to take up their post. The guards with carbines were posted by the guard commander, cadet Janos Meysarosh, the head of the guard was the commander of the cavalry division Nikolai Dreyer. The honour guard consisted of representatives of different social strata. Koblov and Kashkin were children of farm laborers, Meysarosh was the son of a railroad worker, and the head of the guard Dreyer was a nobleman.

The guards walked on either side of the coffin, which was slowly carried. At the mausoleum, they turned to face each other and froze with rifles at the entrance. The cadets changed every hour at the sound of the Kremlin chimes, to the second ringing.

In 1925, on the first anniversary of Vladimir Lenin's death, the honour guard together with the Kremlin guards was made up of cadets, Red Army soldiers, and commanders of other military schools and regiments of the Moscow garrison. Workers and peasants stood guard at the sarcophagus with them. During this period, the ceremony of changing guards at the Mausoleum was born.

In 1935, the honour guard was transferred to the Red Army soldiers of the Kremlin Regiment, which was housed in the former barracks of the relocated All-Russian Central Executive Committee Military School. There was a strict selection process for the special guard company. The moral character of the soldiers was extremely important.

A wooden model of the mausoleum was made for training. Future guards of Post No. 1 practiced and perfected the Kremlin marching step, rifle techniques, coordinated movements, and the ability to walk from the Spassky Gate to the post in exactly 2 minutes and 35 seconds, taking 210 steps. At different times, the regiment's staff included from 30 to 50 people - from one to one and a half platoons.

=== Second World War ===
With the beginning of the Great Patriotic War, the question of protecting the mausoleum from aerial bombardment and preserving the body of Vladimir Lenin was raised. In accordance with a secret order of the People's Commissariat for State Security, on July 3, 1941, the body of Vladimir Lenin was taken from Moscow to Tyumen in a special train car. The train was guarded by employees of the 1st Department of the People's Commissariat for State Security and the Commandant's Office of the Moscow Kremlin. Post No. 1 was also transferred to a railway car. Upon arrival in Tyumen, the guards took up their post as soon as the sarcophagus with Lenin's body was installed in its new location. During this time, the guard of honour service at the mausoleum in Moscow did not stop. Lenin's body was returned to the capital in April 1945.

=== Post-war ===
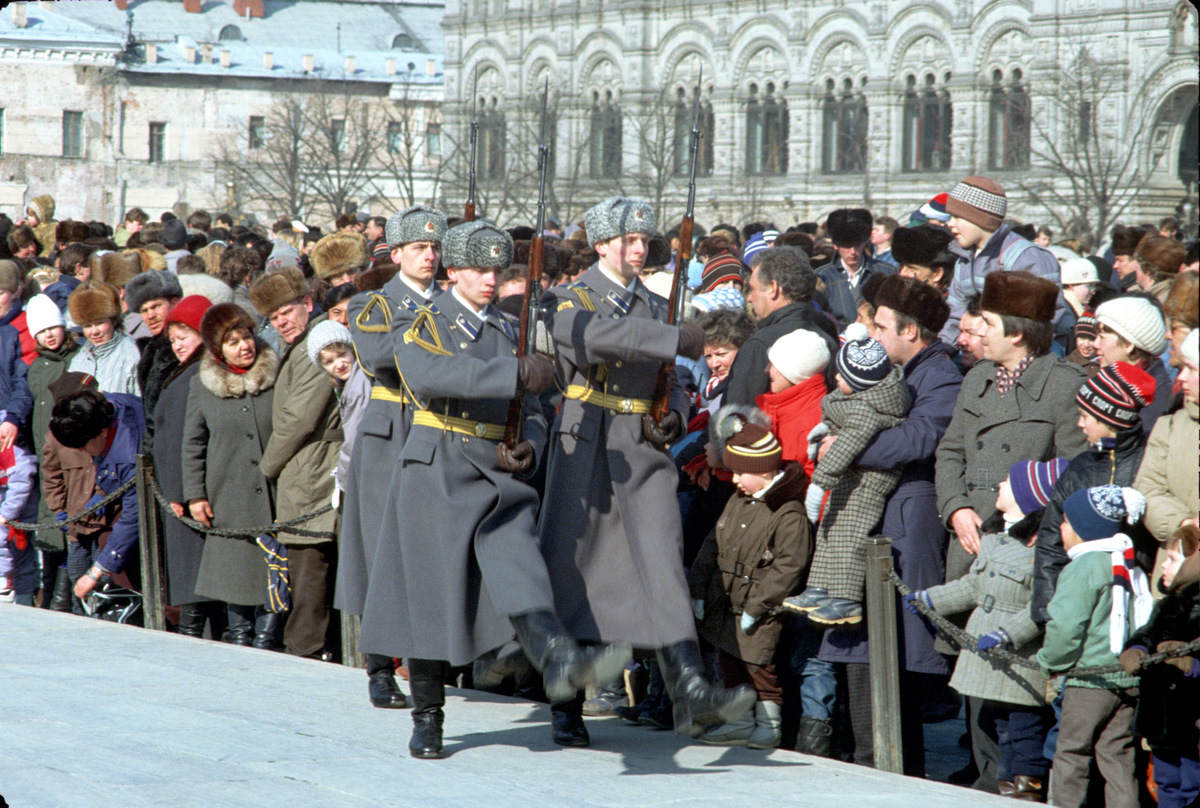
Change of guard at Post No. 1 next to Lenin's Mausoleum, 1990

In the 1960s, the tradition of periodically posting paired guards near the mausoleum was revived: veterans who graduated from the All-Russian Central Executive Committee Military School stood next to the soldiers. Every year on April 22, veterans stood at Post No. 1 along with the sentries. And on the eve of the October celebrations, descendants of the sailors of the battleship Potemkin and the cruiser Aurora stood at the wreaths laid by the naval parade regiment. On November 1, 1967, a new dress uniform was introduced for the guards guarding the Mausoleum.

On July 6, 1976, by order of the Chairman of the KGB, a special guard company was created on the basis of the platoons that served at the post near the Mausoleum and were organizationally part of various companies of the regiment. This was done in order to purposefully and efficiently prepare soldiers and sergeants for service at Post No. 1 and to guard the Mausoleum during visitor access hours.

=== Russian Federation ===
On June 20, 1992, about 30 adherents of a religious sect (the so-called "Theotokos Center") attempted to break into the Mausoleum to anathematize Lenin. The honour guard responded to this attack without using force - they simply locked themselves in the Mausoleum from the inside.

In 1993, after the events of October 3–4, 1993, Boris Yeltsin abolished Post No. 1. The order to end guard duty at the Mausoleum was given by the head of the Main Security Directorate. The last watch was carried by Corporal Vadim Dedkov and Private Roman Poletayev. On October 6, 1993, at 4:00 p.m., Sergeant Oleg Zamotkin led the last shift away. The guards turned their backs on the crowd and left through the back entrance of the mausoleum. And in December of that year, Boris Yeltsin, in the new Internal Service Regulations of the Russian Armed Forces, removed the mausoleum from the list of places where military honours should be rendered.

=== Tomb of the Unknown Soldier ===
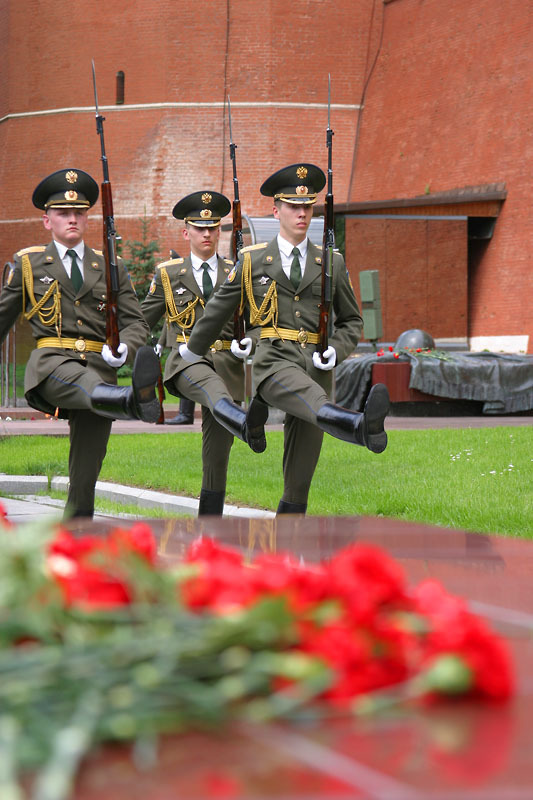
Changing of the guard of honour in the Alexander Garden, 2005

In 1997, the Tomb of the Unknown Soldier in the Alexander Garden near the Kremlin Wall became the new permanent location of the Honour Guard.

According to the Sergey Devyatov, official representative of the Federal Security Service

This is now the location of the country's main Honour Guard, which is logical. This emphasizes the significance of our victory in World War II and the heroism that the soldiers showed. The tradition of establishing a main post with sentries at military graves exists in many countries around the world. Military honours are given to those who died defending the country, the people, and this is entirely justified from a historical point of view.

Until this time, there was no permanent post at the Eternal Flame. The special guard company is the calling card of the Presidential Regiment, so special requirements are imposed on it in terms of physical fitness and height. Sentries were posted during ceremonial and memorial events and wreath-laying. The order of service and the ritual of changing the guards were approved for the honour guard, and a uniform was developed. The posts were equipped with booths and supplied with technical means and communications. In winter, the booths were heated from below and blown with warm air.

On December 12, 1997, at 8:00, the first guard of honour, Senior Sergeant M. P. Volgunov, led the first shift of corporals R. V. Chernoburov and A. G. Gorbashkov to the main post of the country.

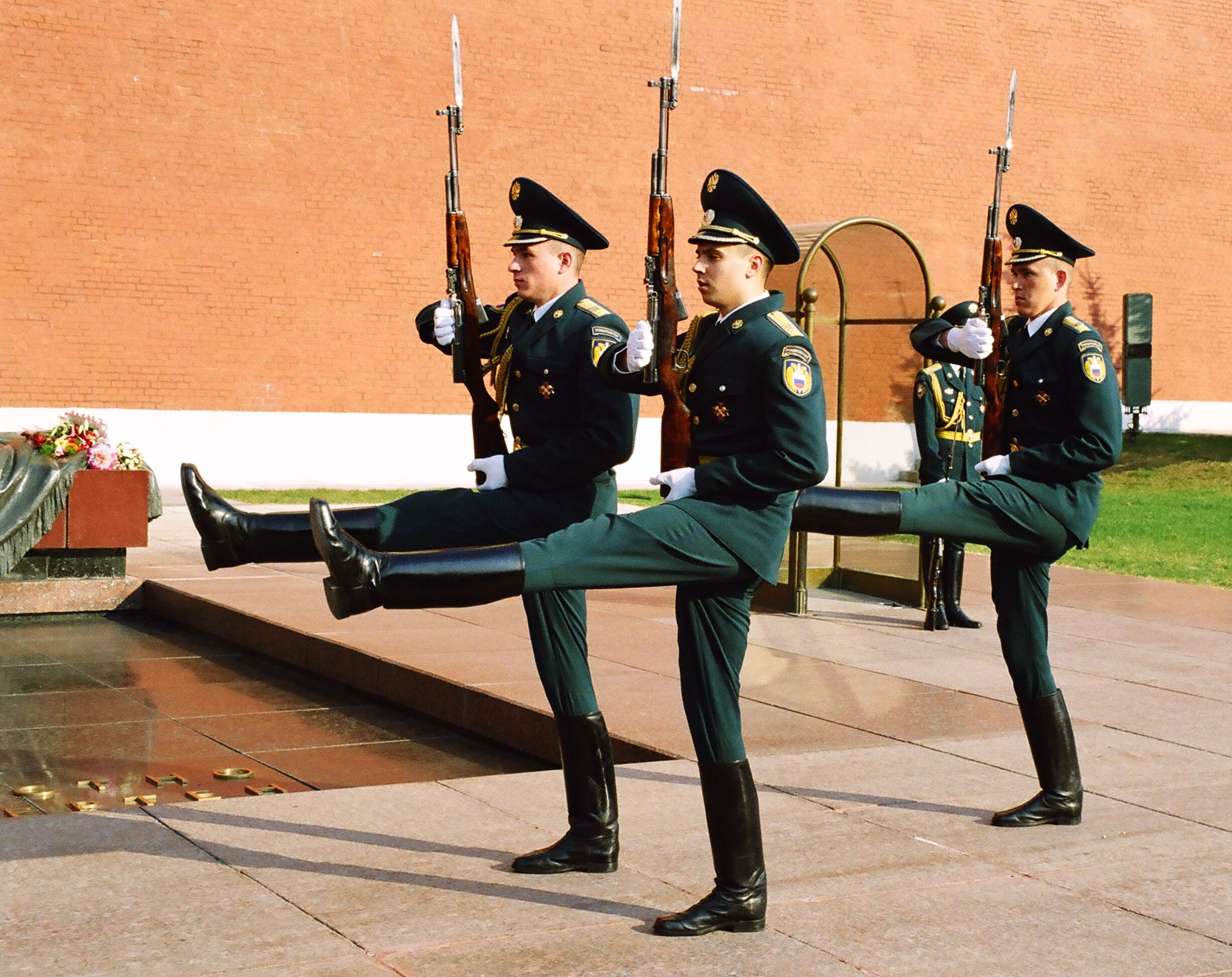
Changing of the Guard of Honour, 2006

According to the presidential decree signed by Boris Yeltsin on December 9, 1997, the guard was changed every hour from 8:00 to 20:00. In the ceremonial ritual of changing the guards, the synchronicity of the participants' actions was perfected: from the extended toe to the ground at a distance of 20 centimetres. The movement of the straight leg at the knee comes from the hip, with both the right and left soles falling on the same line. This complex step has remained since the tsarist times. The soldiers stand at the Tomb of the Unknown Soldier for 60 minutes, then rest for 3 hours and go to the post again. The guards are armed with Simonov self-loading carbines, but the carbines are dummies. However, in the event of a threat or attempted vandalism at the Tomb of the Unknown Soldier, the guard has the right to use physical force, as well as to stab with a bayonet and defend themselves with a butt. The modern order of the revived ceremony was developed in 2005 by servicemen of the Presidential Regiment and protocol officers of the President of Russia under the leadership of the Commandant of the Kremlin in agreement with the Heraldic Council of the President. When preparing the script, the developers familiarized themselves with ceremonies in other countries. The changing of the guard is symbolic, the most striking moments are the parade ground and the carrying out of the Russian flag.

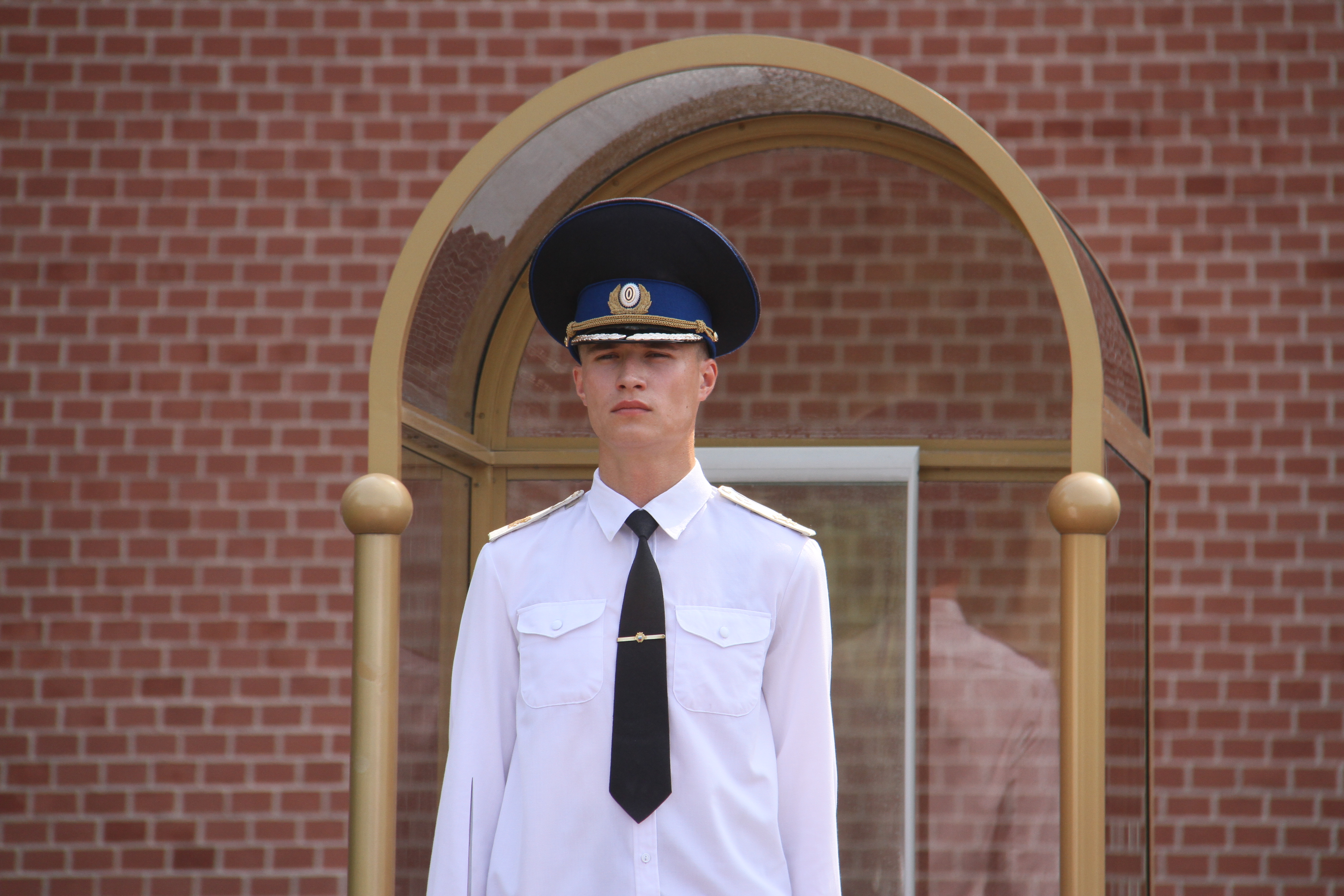
Guard of Post No. 1, July 2016

By decision of the head of the Federal Security Service, the guard of honour may be posted at other times in exceptional cases. For example, from June 21 to 22, the guard stands around the clock in memory of the beginning of the Great Patriotic War. And on June 3, 2017, the changing of the foot and horse guards was cancelled due to the swearing-in of military personnel: the ceremony included a demonstration of the drill techniques of the honour guard with weapons and a horse carousel of cavalrymen.

Every year on Victory Day, war veterans and other people with burning candles gather at Post No. 1 for a memorial vigil. Wreaths and flowers are laid at the memorial in memory of those who died for Russia on the battlefield. Heads of delegations of foreign states also come to the grave during visits to Russia to honour the memory of the heroes.

In 2009, the monument to the unknown soldier was given the status of a National Memorial of Military Glory, and the complex itself was supplemented with a stele in honour of the cities bearing the honorary title of the same name.

In the mid-1990s, Post No. 1 was emotionally presented in the Russian Project a series of patriotic TV spots shown on ORT. According to the plot, a mother comes to her son, who is on guard duty at Post No. 1 near the mausoleum, and the audience asks him to "wave to mom".
