= Gleb Karakulov =

Russian security officer, born ca. 1987

- Глеб Каракулов
- Born: October 12, 1987 (age 38)
- Occupation: Captain of Russian Federal Protective Service

Gleb Karakulov (Russian: Глеб Каракулов) is a Russian engineer and defector who attained the rank of captain in a field unit of the presidential communications department of the secretive FSO. He was responsible for establishing secure communications for the Russian president and prime minister.

On 14 October 2022, Karakulov flew with his wife and daughter to Turkey. He is in hiding with his family, and is one of the highest-ranking Russians to defect over the Russian invasion of Ukraine.
