= Vertushka =

Soviet and Russian internal phone system

The Vertushka (Russian: Вертушка) also known as Kremlyovka (Russian: Кремлёвка) or Spetssvyaz (Russian: Спецсвязь) is a colloquial name for a closed system of party and government telephone communications in the Soviet Union and Russia. It received the unofficial (slang) name Vertushka because, unlike the regular telephone network, where at that time the connection was made through an operator, subscribers connected to each other using an automatic telephone exchange and a rotary dial called in Russian a vertushka. The existence of the system was a novelty in an era dominated by manual switchboards. Certain sub-systems of it directly linked to the Kremlin. In the Soviet period, they connected the leader to key subordinates--- regional party secretaries, high-ranking military officials, and directors of important state-owned factories. The regularly-modernized system of government ATS continues to operate to this day.

== Overview ==
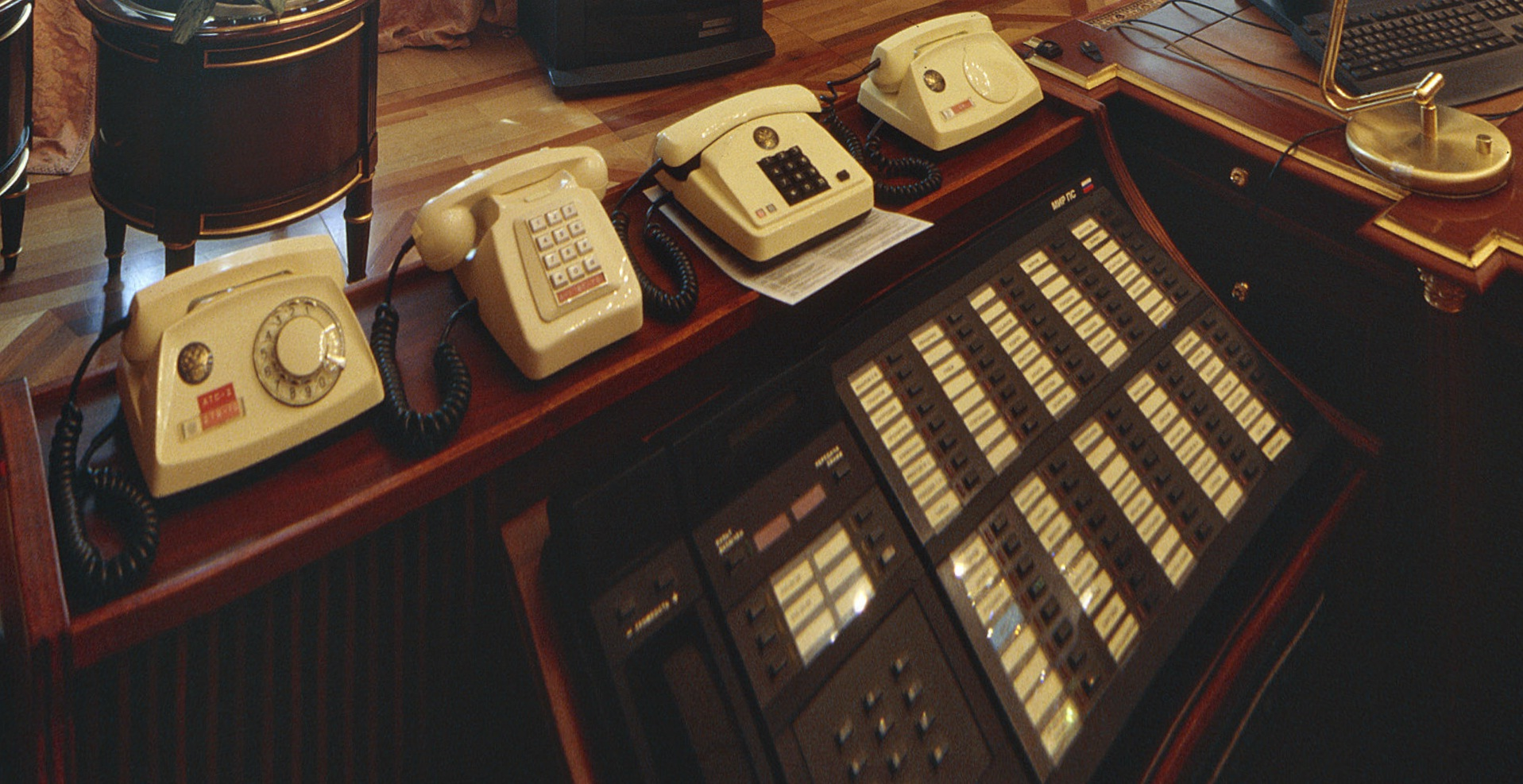
The telephones in the office of the President of Russia, 2003.

Later, the system was intensively expanded, and was also equipped with an outlet to other government and military communications systems (the so-called V.CH-communications (Russian: ВЧ-связь), which were also often called Vertushka by the people. While the term Vertushka could be referred to any government-used telephone, in many cases it was used to describe a direct link to the highest echelons of power, i.e to the Kremlin and the country's top leadership. More specific systems are:

- ATS-1 (the most prestigious communication system for subscribers of the highest category - top government officials, ministers, deputy ministers);
- ATS-2 (a wider network of city government communications - for example, ATS-2 devices are owned by department directors of federal ministries, heads and deputy heads of federal services and agencies). Having a Vertushka in the office was an important status indicator of belonging to a high rank in the hierarchy of power.

Parallel systems existed in other cities, as well as in the capitals of Soviet satellite states, as well as in many Soviet ministries and departments, to make up for an insufficiency in funding levels for a true national network; the legacy of this persisted beyond the fall of the Soviet Union, with approximately 20 percent of phones in 1991 existing on private networks.

Vertushka is not protected, but is linked to other government systems of secure communications with long-term cryptographic resistance, including the mobile radiotelephone system ("Kavkaz"), etc.

== History ==
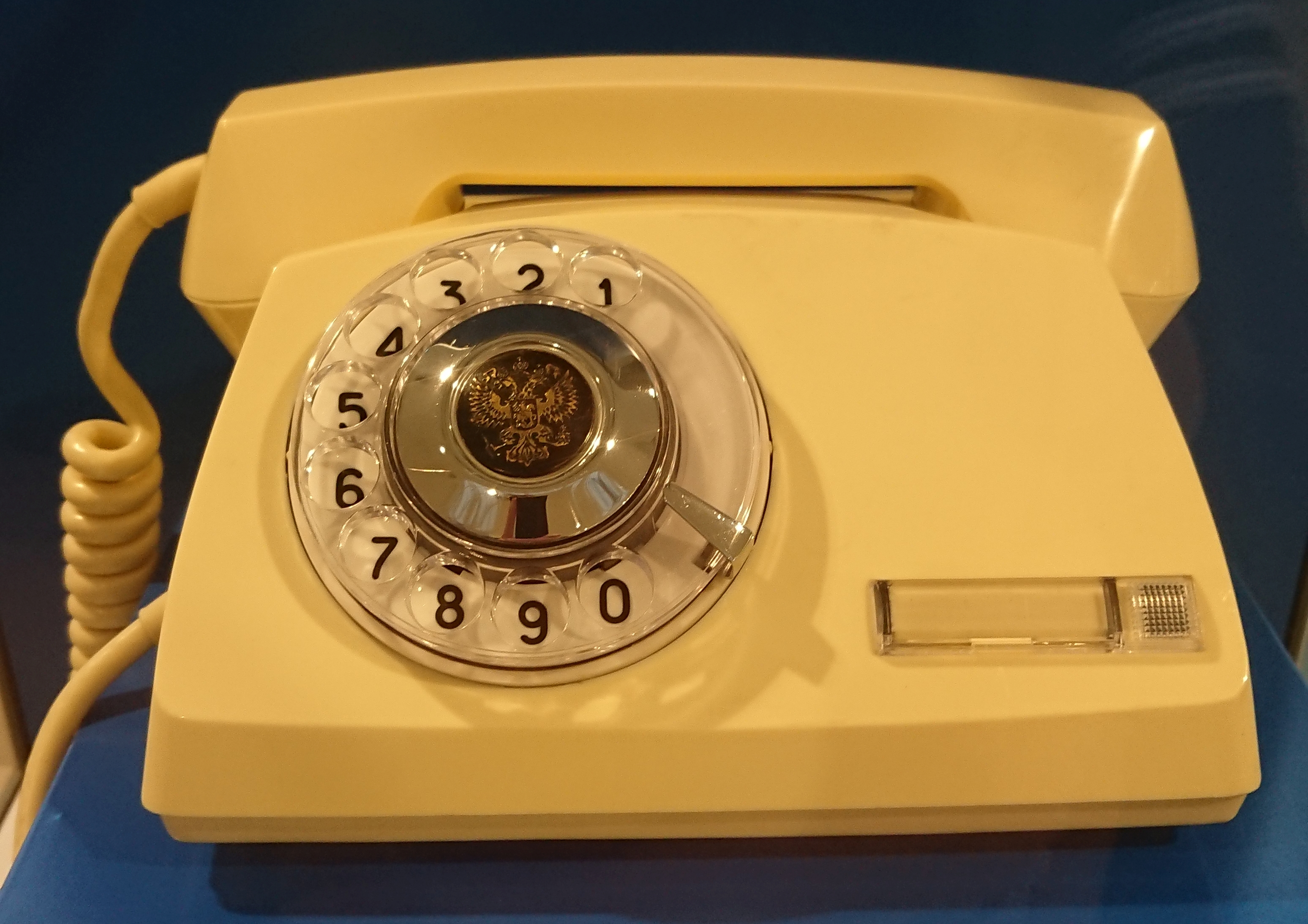
A Vertushka from the 90s with the state emblem of the Russian Federation on it

In September 1918 a 100-number switchboard CB-100/20 was installed in the Kremlin telephone room on the order of Vladimir Lenin. In 1922 an automatic telephone exchange known as ATS VTsIK (Russian: АТС ВЦИК) was installed in the Kremlin, the number of subscribers reached 300 people, some telephones were installed at the homes of senior party and Soviet officials. In 1947 a duplex mobile radio communication system "Integral-Gradient" (installed on cars) and a radio mobile communication system "Red Square" (to provide radio communications for events on Red Square and in other places) were created for the needs of the Main Directorate of the Ministry of State Security. In 1948 with the introduction of the city telephone exchange of the machine system, the capacity of the Kremlin service telephone network was increased by 1000 numbers. By 1954 the capacity of the government automatic telephone exchange (ATX) in the Kremlin is 3,500 numbers due to the installation of switching equipment for a domestically produced ten-step system for 1,000 numbers. In the 1960s in the countries of the communist bloc, their own government communication networks are organized, for which they are given stations and equipment for high-frequency communication and classification equipment, the codes for which were manufactured in the Soviet Union and sent to their destinations by diplomatic mail. In 1963 the radio communication system on Red Square "North" is developed and manufactured for communication of operational personnel during events on Red Square and in other places. In 1978 a dedicated government city automatic telephone communication system for the highest category of subscribers for 1000 numbers was put into operation, which received the name ATS-1, and the existing network of city government communications (PATS) with a capacity of 5000 numbers was renamed ATS-2.

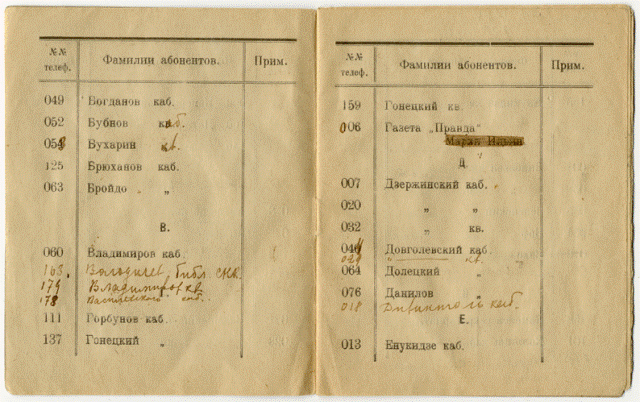
Governmental telephone directory, 1922. Bubnov, Bukharin, Vladimirov, Ganetsky, Dzerzhinsky and Dovgalevsky have telephones installed in their apartments.

In 1979, in accordance the Resolution of the Central Committee of the Communist Party of the Soviet Union and the Council of Ministers of the Soviet Union No. 558-183 of June 13, 1979, a new "Regulation on Government Communications" was approved, in accordance with which government communications in the USSR were created. In 1982 based on foreign quasi-electronic equipment, the capacity of ATS-1 was increased to 2,000 numbers. In 1983 a domestic quasi-electronic station for the government communications network, ATS-2, was put into operation in the Kremlin, and the capacity of the ATS-2 network was 7,000 numbers in Moscow and 10,000 numbers across the country (including zone stations). By 1997 the government communications covered about 300 cities and special facilities, telephone communications were provided to more than 20 thousand subscribers, document communications covered over 1,600 government agencies and various organizations, in 79 cities, radio communication complexes with mobile objects operate, which serve over 3 thousand subscribers.

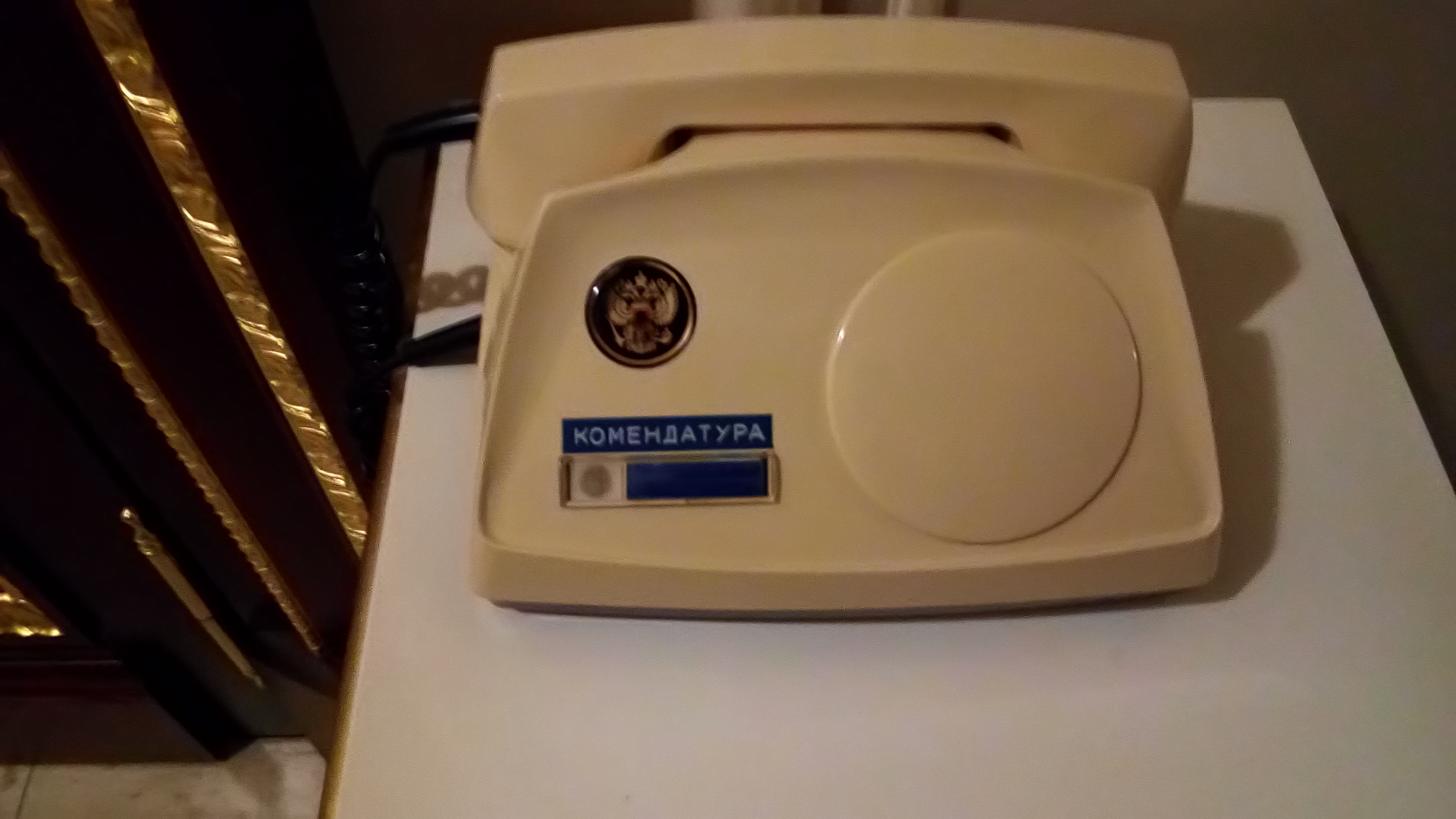
Vertushka at the Constantine Palace, one of the residences of the President of Russia

Since the 1970s, conventional four-wire devices have been used as Vertushka telephones, from a circuit engineering point of view. Their distinctive feature was the State Emblem of the Soviet Union on the dialer and increased protection against radio leakage (shielding of parts, graphite coating inside the case). In the Soviet Union, there was a strict rule according to which only the owner of the device was obliged to answer calls from the ATS-1. In his absence, a special duty officer had to pick up the receiver with the words: "The device of comrade [Yakovlev]". After the collapse of the USSR, the rules quickly began to become a thing of the past, ministers began to move ATS-2 and even ATS-1 devices to the reception area. As a result, dialing via government communications began to take almost as much time as via a regular city line, and the prestige of the "vertushka" fell sharply. The restoration of strict rules began in 1996 by order of Viktor Chernomyrdin. Following the dissolution of the Soviet Union governmental telephones were produced with the Coat of arms of Russia.
