= Kremlin Regiment =

Unit of the Russian Federal Protective Service that ensures the security of the Kremlin

- Кремлёвский полк
- Great emblem of the Kremlin Regiment
- Active: 1936 – present
- Country: Russia
- Branch: Federal Protective Service
- Role: Public duties Security of the Presidency of Russia and the Moscow Kremlin
- Part of: Commandant's Office of the Moscow Kremlin
- Mottos: Верность, Честь, Долг (Russian); Fidelity, Honour, Duty
- Equipment: SKS
- Engagements: Great Patriotic War
- Decorations: Order of the Red Banner; Order of the October Revolution; Order of Zhukov

Commanders
- Commandant of the Moscow Kremlin: Major General Sergey Udovenko
- Regimental Commander: Major General Mikhail Suraikin

The Kremlin Regiment (Russian: Кремлёвский полк, romanized: Kremlyovskiy polk), also called the Presidential Regiment (Russian: Президентский полк, romanized: Prezidentskiy polk), is a unique military regiment and part of the Russian Federal Protective Service with the status of a special unit. The regiment ensures the security of the Kremlin, its treasures, and state officials. In accordance with the federal law of December 8, 1997 "On Immortalizing the Soviet People’s Victory in the Great Patriotic War of 1941–1945", the regiment also maintains a guard of honor (Russian: Почётный караул) at the eternal flame of the Tomb of the Unknown Soldier known as Post No. 1 . The regiment is housed in the historic Kremlin Arsenal.

== History ==
=== Origins ===
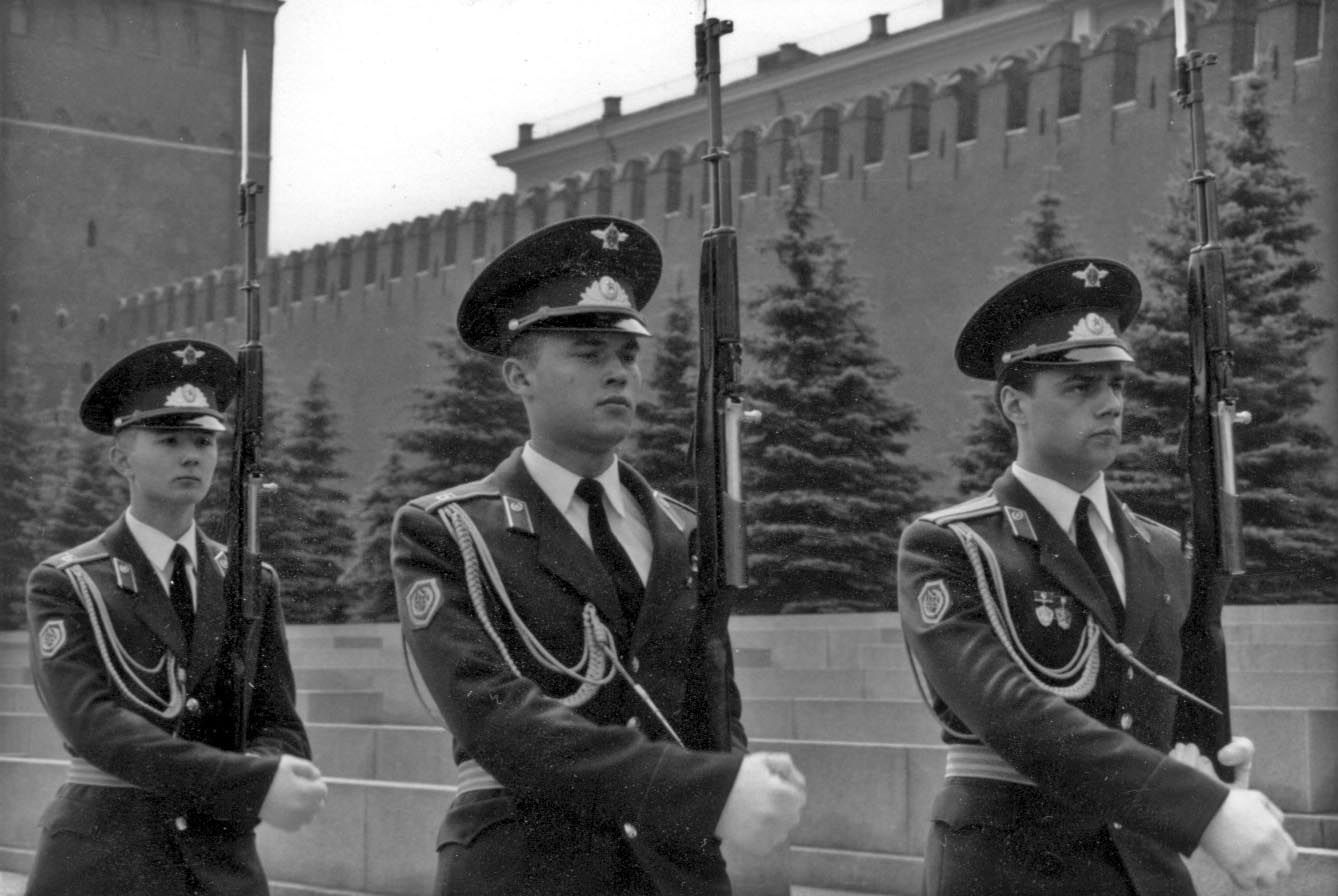
Soviet guards on their way to Lenin's mausoleum, 1988

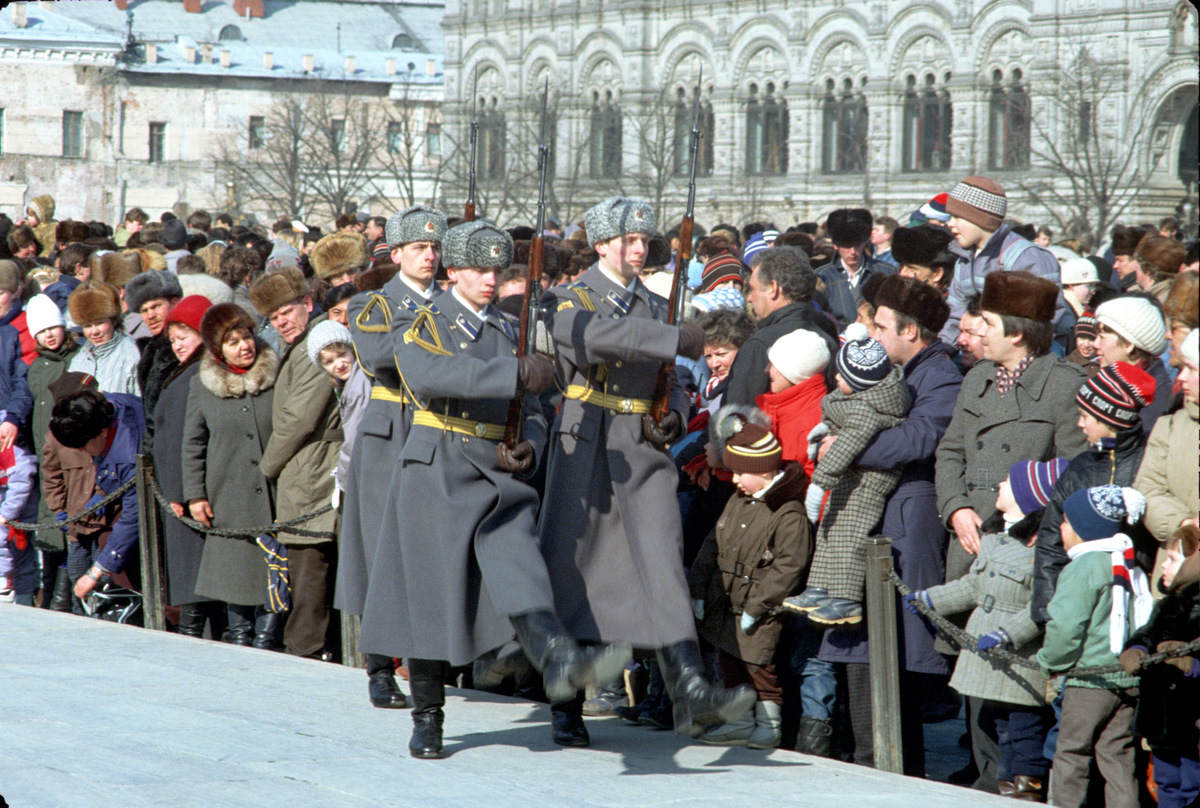
Soviet guard on their way from Lenin's mausoleum, 1990

When the leaders of the Soviet Union moved from Petrograd to the Moscow Kremlin in early 1918, their protection was entrusted to the Red Latvian Riflemen, under the command of the Commandant of the Kremlin Garrison. In September 1918, the Latvian Riflemen left for the fronts of the Civil War, and they were replaced by the officer cadets of the 1st WPKA Soviet Joint Military School "All-Russian Central Executive Committee" that were redeployed into the Kremlin for this purpose. In 1924, they were assigned with the duty to guard Lenin's Mausoleum by orders of the ARCEC.

In October 1935, the officers' academy left the Kremlin for the Moscow district of Lefortovo and a Special Purpose Battalion was created to replace them on Kremlin and Mausoleum guard duties. On January 28, 1936, the battalion – and the Kremlin Garrison (Komendatura Kremlya), to which it was subordinated – were transferred from the People's Commissariat of Defense of the USSR to the People's Commissariat of Internal Affairs (NKVD) of the USSR. The UKMK and the 1st Division were separate public security units with neither subordinate to the other, which would not prevent them collaborating closely in Kremlin security activities.

On April 8, 1936, in accordance with Order No. 122 for the Moscow Kremlin Garrison, the Special Purpose Battalion became the Special Purpose Regiment; this day is considered the birthday of the regiment. However, the Regiment's Day is celebrated annually on May 7. Since in recent years the date has also been the day of Russian presidential inaugurations, the new President of Russia, following his oath-taking ceremony, receives the salute of the regiment on this day.

=== World War II and post war era ===
When the Great Patriotic War began in 1941, the units of the Kremlin Garrison were made responsible for defending the Kremlin, where the State Defense Committee and Chief Military Headquarters were located. On June 25, 1941, the Commandant of the Garrison ordered the regiment to reinforce the defenses, and the regiment set up round-the-clock guard on the Kremlin walls. In 1942–1943 four groups of snipers from the Kremlin Regiment were sent to the Western and Volkhov Fronts. The snipers killed more than 1,200 German soldiers and officers, losing only 97 men in combat. On February 23, 1944, the Kremlin Regiment was decorated with the Order of the Red Banner. Three battalions from the regiment took part in the Moscow Victory Parade of 1945 on Red Square.

In 1952 the regiment was reorganized into the Separate Special Purpose Regiment. On May 7, 1965, it was decorated with the Order of the Red Banner for its military achievements during the Great Patriotic War. On May 8, 1967, the regiment took part in the unveiling ceremony of the Tomb of the Unknown Soldier in the Alexander Garden. In 1973 the unit was renamed the Separate Red Banner Kremlin Regiment, later receiving an Order of the October Revolution.

=== Russian Federation (1991-Present) ===
Before being deprived of Mausoleum guard duties in 1993 as a result of the collapse of the Soviet Union and the constitutional crisis of that year, the regiment finally received its current designation in accordance with a presidential decree of March 20 that year, this time under the Federal Protective Service. Since 1997 the Kremlin Regiment has resumed guard duties by presidential decree on the Tomb of the Unknown Soldier and its Eternal Flame, keeping alive the legacy of those who served on the Eastern Front.

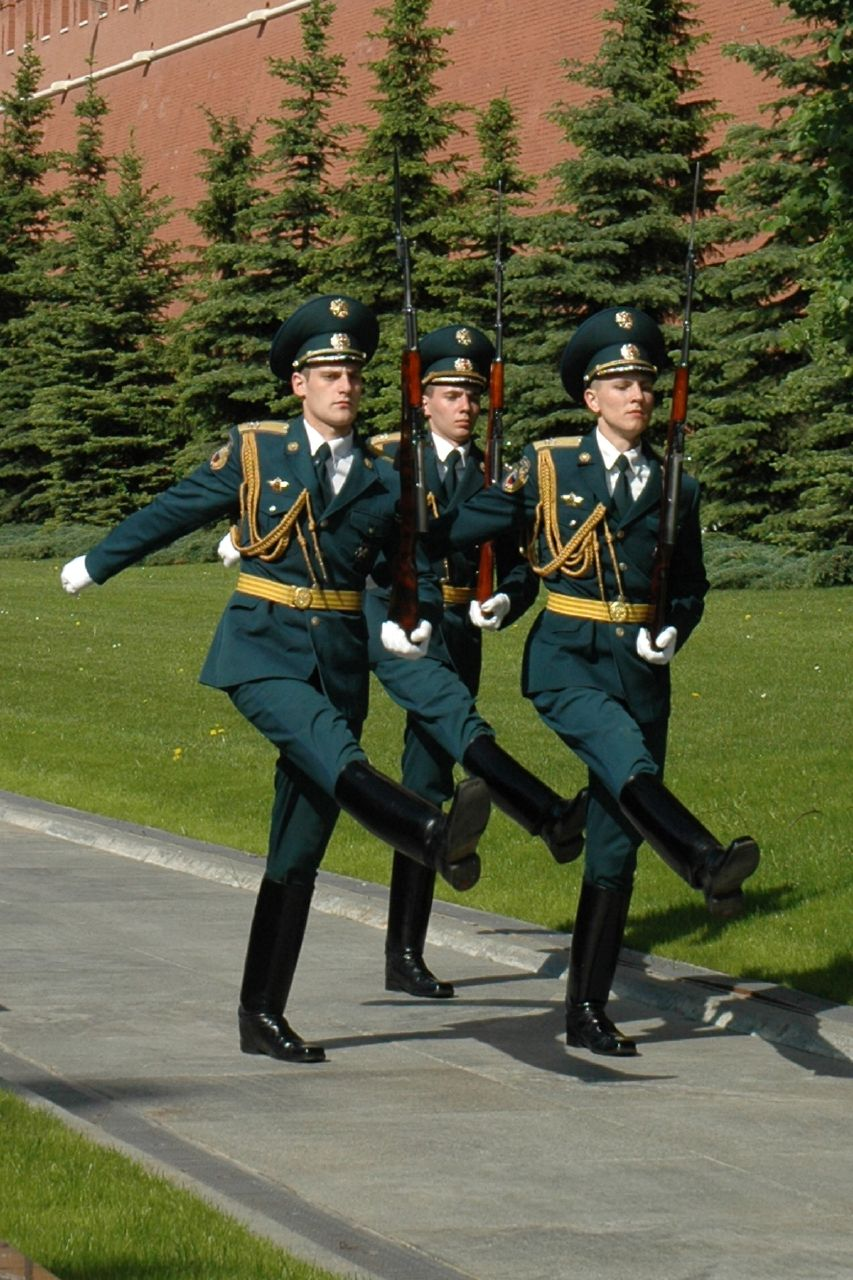
Changing of the Guard at the Tomb of the Unknown Soldier in Alexander Garden, Moscow, 2008. Soldiers are dressed in the former modern dress uniform.

On September 2, 2002, on the basis of the 11th Cavalry Regiment (the Moscow Military District movie-making cavalry unit) a cavalry escort unit was formed as part of the Presidential Regiment. Starting in 2004 a Guard Mounting ceremony has been held on Cathedral Square on Sundays, from March to October.

On May 7, 2006, the regiment gained a new regimental color modeled on the ones used by the Imperial Guard units. Around that time it also acquired special ceremonial uniforms closely modeled on those worn on parade by the infantry and the cavalry of the Russian Imperial Guard until 1914. These are worn in addition to modern style dress uniforms adapted from those utilised during the Soviet period. The historical uniform is in the historical wave-green colouring with cornflower blue piping and facings, whereas the modern dress uniform is a navy blue with cornflower blue piping. The historical dress uniform is a closed-collar tunic with a cornflower blue plastron, whereas the modern dress uniform is an open-collar jacket with a white dress shirt and tie. Shoulder boards are entirely ceremonial for both uniforms, both in entirely different designs, despite the ranks of the troops being the same between each. For both, only officers have ranks displayed. When in modern dress uniforms, soldiers wear peaked caps with a Soviet-style wreathed cockade. For historical dress, troops wear shakos with a sunburst Imperial eagle emblem. In historical dress, enlisted soldiers wear white belts and officers wear silver sash belts. In modern dress, all soldiers wear golden aigulettes and golden belts. In historical dress, gorgets are reflective of imperial officer insignia, whereas in modern dress, these are reflective of the Soviet general insignia. For both, white gloves, tall jackboots are worn and either SKS rifles or sabres are carried. During winter, double-breasted greatcoats are worn, these are gray for the historical dress uniform and navy blue for the modern dress uniform. The Regiment's Presidential Band wears white uniforms similar to those by the Imperial Guard bands of the late 19th century. The regiments casual dress is navy blue and features either a peaked cap or cornflower blue beret.

Uniforms based on the ones used by the infantry of the Regiment during the Second World War were worn for the first time by a platoon from the 1st Honor Guard Company during the 2015 Spasskaya Tower Military Music Festival and Tattoo.

On April 16, 2016, the Guard Mounting that day featured the first woman officer to serve in the Cavalry Squadron, the first time this had happened in a guard changing ceremony. This was also the first to be live streamed online.

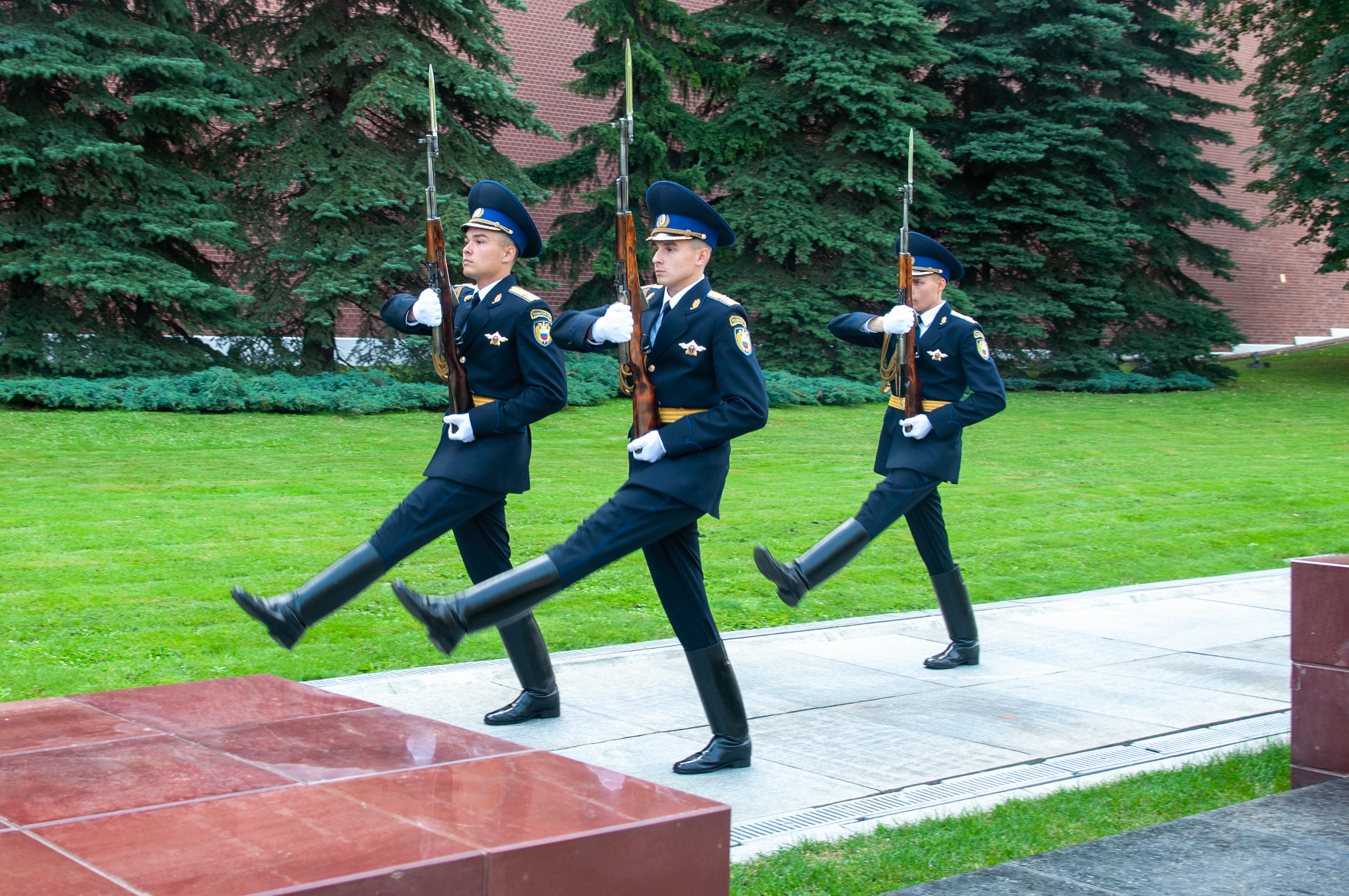
Changing of the Guard at the Tomb of the Unknown Soldier in 2019. Soldiers here are dressed in the current modern dress uniform.

== Notable servicemen of Kremlin Regiment ==
- Mikhail Kasyanov, former Prime Minister of Russia, who was later named a “foreign agent” by the Russian government
- Alexander Korzhakov, former head of the Federal Protective Service of Russia
- Andrei Lugovoi, deputy of the State Duma who was later indicted by UK authorities on charges of murdering Alexander Litvinenko.

== Component units ==
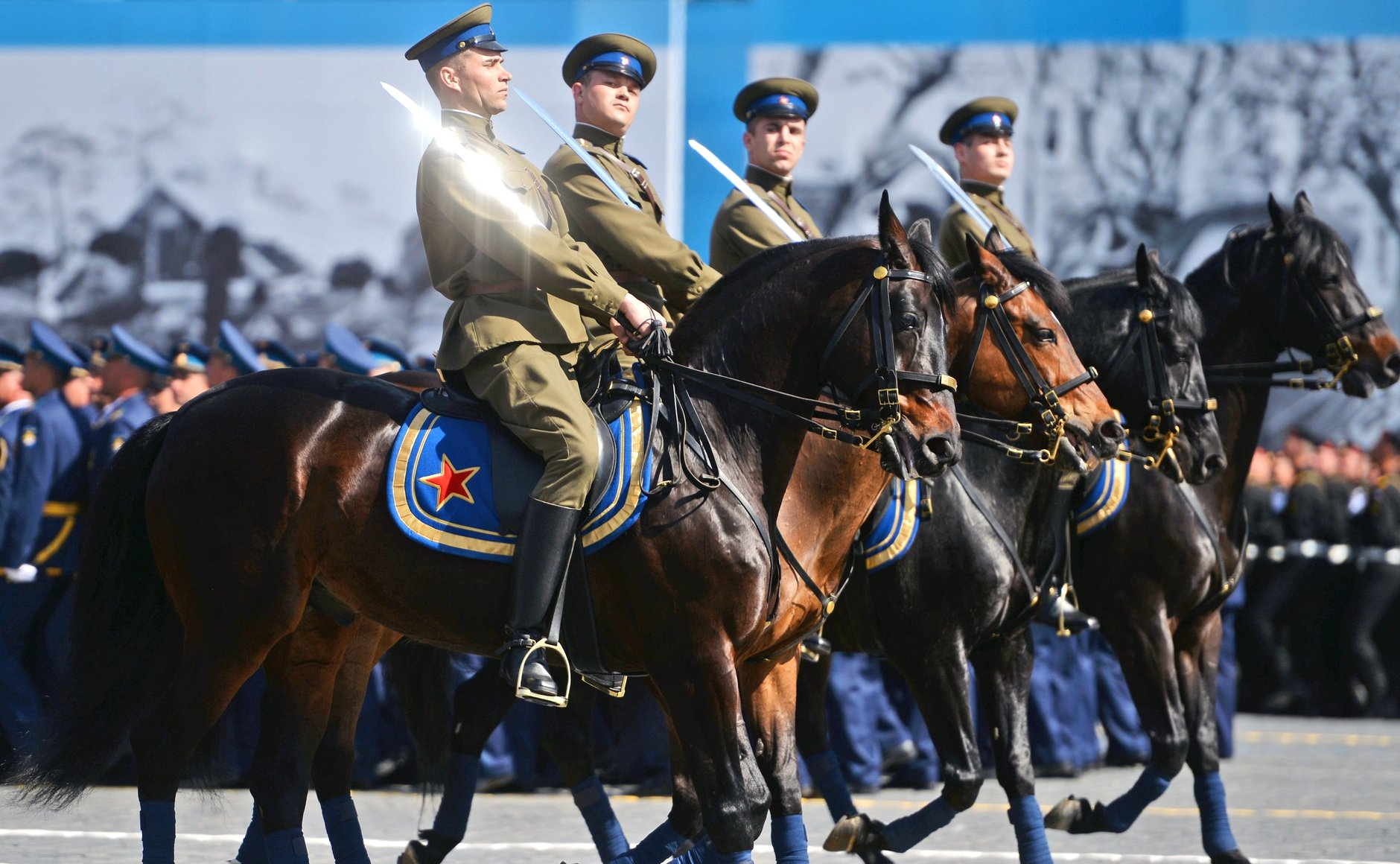
Horsemen of the Presidential Cavalry Escort Battalion dressed in World War II-era Red Army uniforms riding down Red Square at the 2015 Moscow Victory Day Parade.

- Regiment HQ
- Presidential Band of the Kremlin Regiment
- 1st Battalion, Kremlin Regiment
  - 2nd Company
  - 3rd Company
  - 4th Company
  - 5th Company
- 2nd Battalion, Kremlin Regiment
  - 6th Company
  - 7th Company
  - 8th Company
  - 9th Company
- 3rd Battalion, Kremlin Regiment
  - 1st Honor Guard Company
  - 11th Honor Guard Company
  - Automotive Company
- Presidential Cavalry Escort Battalion, Kremlin Regiment (former 11th Cavalry Regiment)
  - 10th Company
  - 12th Company
  - 1st Cavalry Squadron
  - 2nd Cavalry Squadron
  - Support Squadron
- 4th Operational Reserve Battalion, Kremlin Regiment
  - Operational Reserve Company
  - Protection Company

=== Band ===
The Presidential Band of the Russian Federation serves as the official military band for the President of Russia, playing at official ceremonies and receptions for high-ranking officials. it is affiliated with the Military Band Service of the Armed Forces of Russia.

=== Ceremonial cavalry ===
The cavalry escort takes part in the Russian presidential inauguration, as well as the Moscow Victory Day Parade on Red Square. Historically, it has taken part in processions on 7 November, specifically in 1941, 1967 and 1987. In certain parades, it is the only unit to represent the FSO on parade. Since 2005 the Cavalry Escort Squadron wears, on select occasions, dress and service uniforms worn by the cavalry units of the Red Army and the NKVD. In addition, since 2004, the cavalry has been participating in the changing of the guard on Cathedral Square and annually performs a demonstration program at the races for the President's Prize.

== Regimental Commanders ==
- Pyotr Azarkin (1937)
- Colonel Mikhail Ivanov (March 1954 – May 4, 1962)
- Colonel Fedor Konev (May 4, 1962 – June 16, 1968)
- Colonel Boris Platov (June 16, 1968 – May 31, 1974)
- Colonel Alexey Ivanov (May 31, 1974 – October 15, 1976)
- Major General Vladimir Redkin (October 15, 1976 – November 23, 1984)
- Major General Ivan Kolenchuk (November 23, 1984 – November 16, 1988)
- Major General Sergey Yangorev (August 2, 1995 - circa 2004)
- Major General Oleg Galkin (circa 2004 - April 2018)
- Major General Andrey Filyakin (April 2018 - circa 2024)
- Major General Mikhail Suraikin (circa 2024 - Present)

== Honours ==
- Order of the Red Banner (23 February 1944, 7 May 1965)
- Order of the October Revolution (1973)
- Certificate of the Supreme Commander-in-Chief of the Russian Armed Forces (7 May 2016)
- Order of Zhukov (23 June 2026)

== Gallery ==
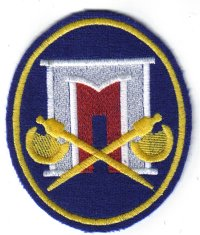
Kremlin Regiment patch

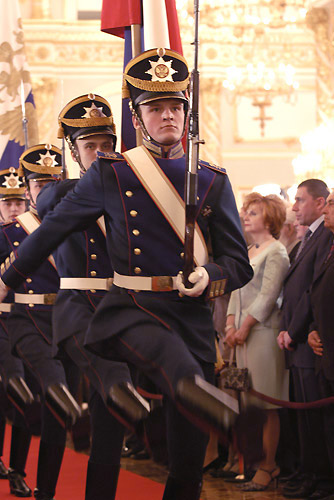
Special ceremonial uniform, since 2006

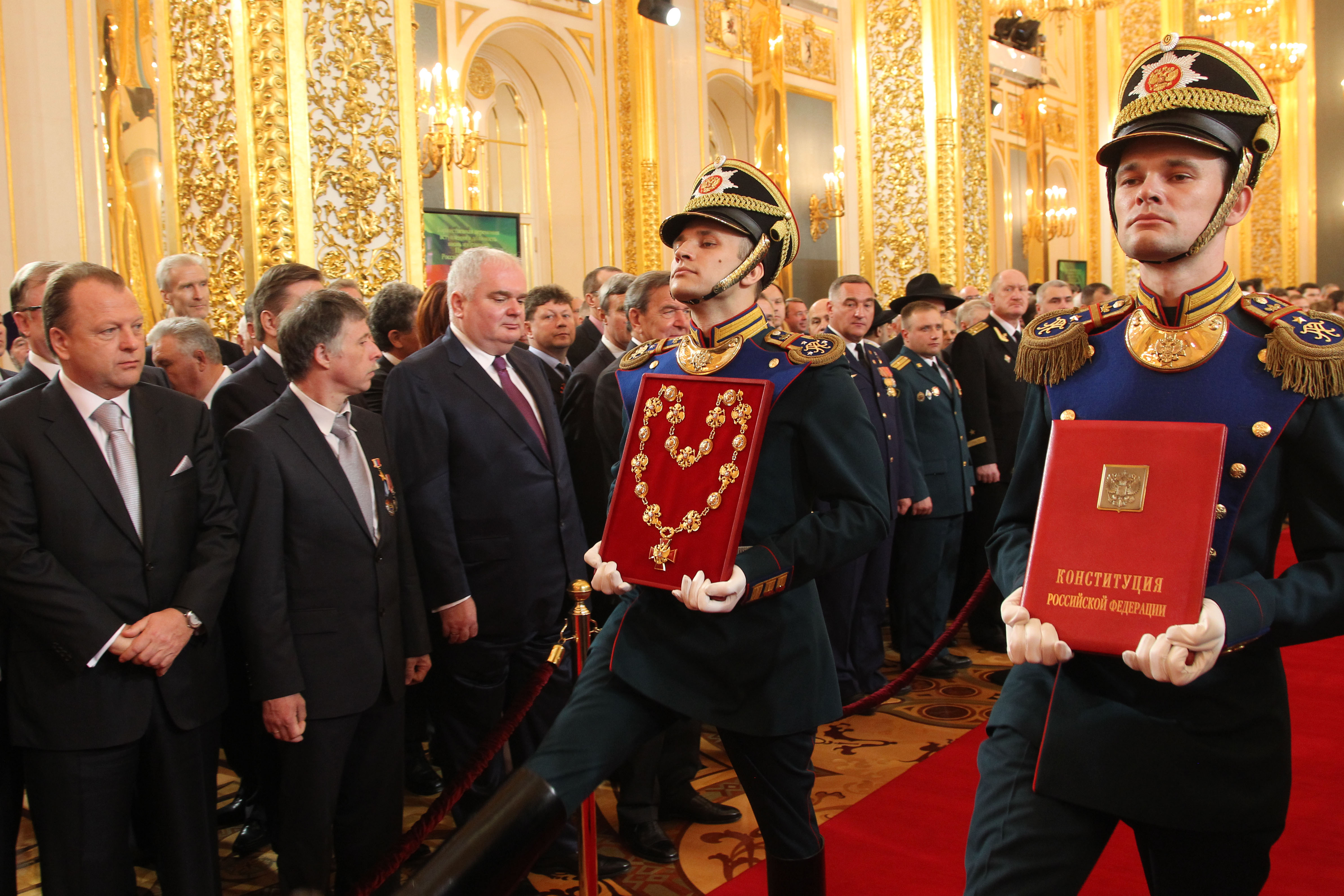
Vladimir Putin inauguration 7 May 2012

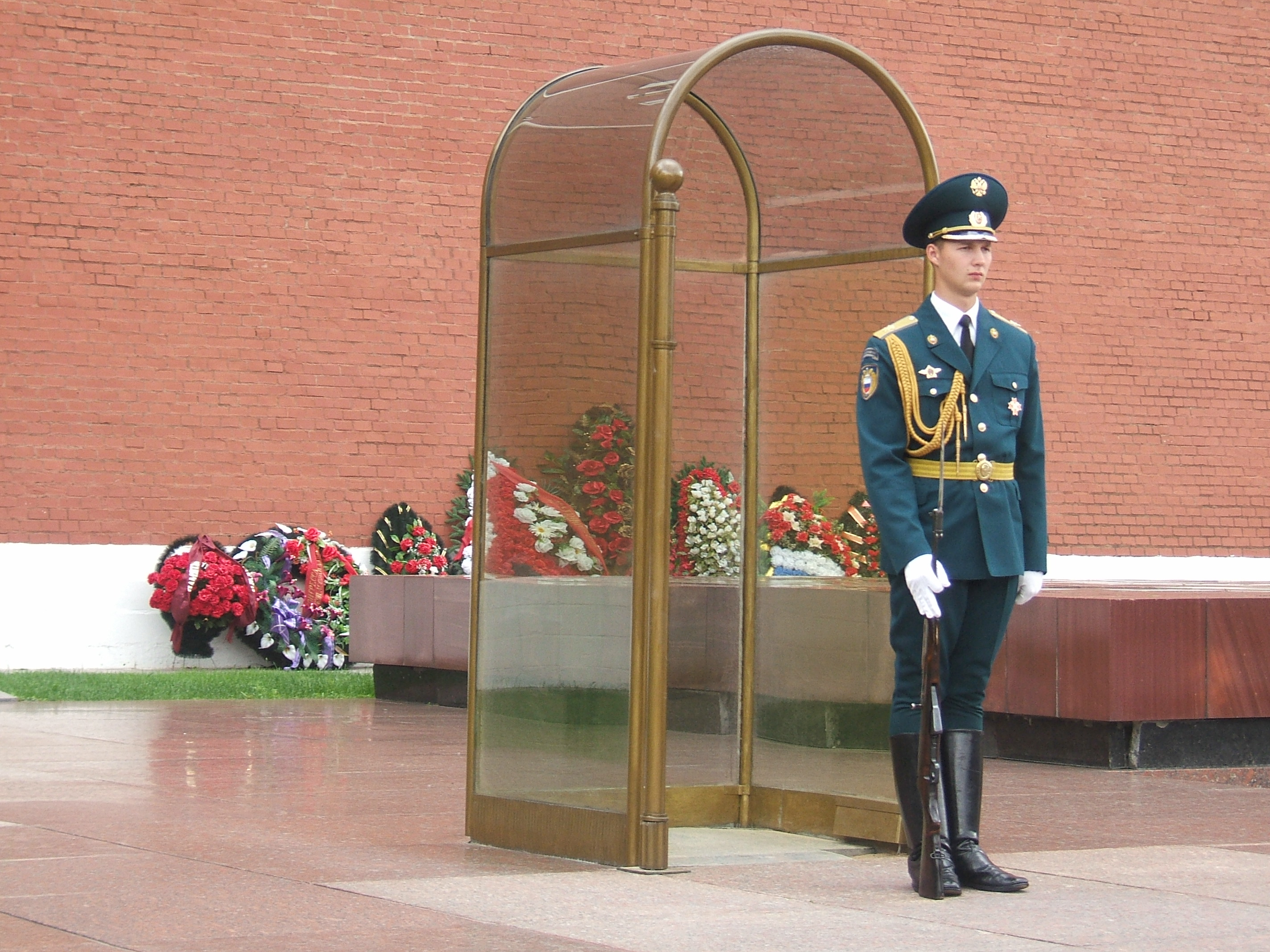
Guarding the Tomb of the Unknown Soldier, with a ceremonial SKS rifle

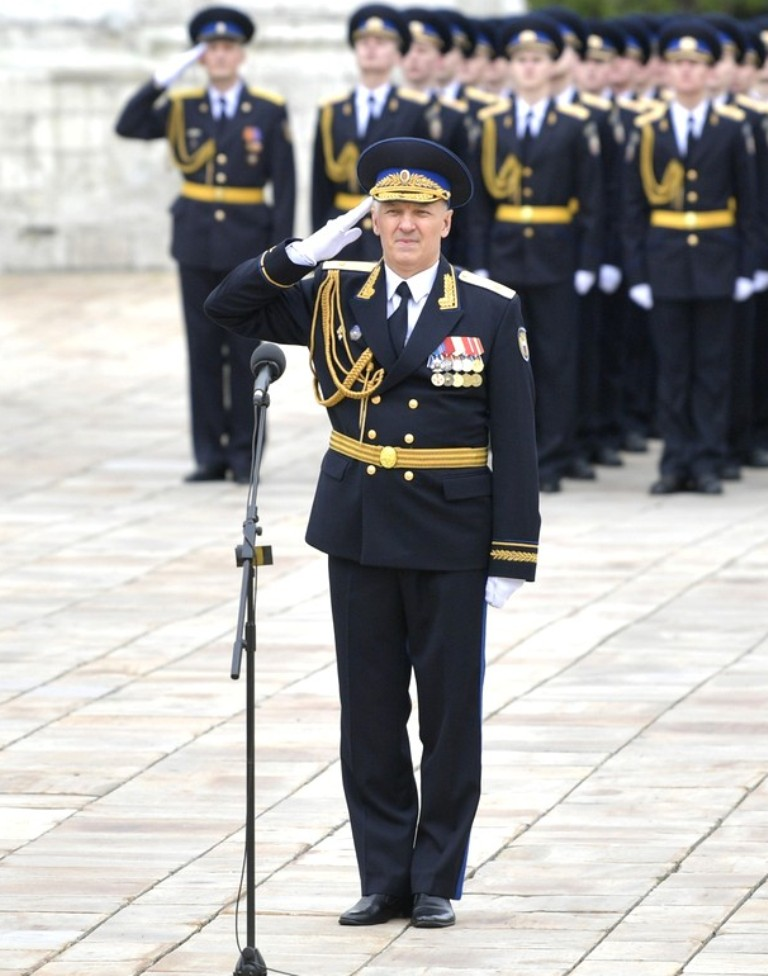
Major General Andrey Filyakin during the Victory Day review of the Kremlin Regiment in 2020.

== See also ==
- 154th Preobrazhensky Independent Commandant's Regiment
- Semyonovsky Life Guards Regiment
- Awards of the Federal Protective Service of the Russian Federation
- Commandant's Office of the Moscow Kremlin
- Federal Protective Service of Russia
- Federal Security Service of Russia
- Ninth Chief Directorate
