= Commandant's Office of the Moscow Kremlin =

- Служба коменданта Московского Кремля
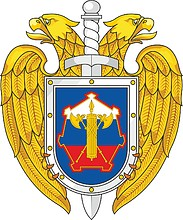
- Moscow Kremlin Commandant Service emblem
- Country: Russia
- Role: Public duties Security of the Presidency of Russia and the Moscow Kremlin
- Part of: Federal Protective Service
- Engagements: Great Patriotic War

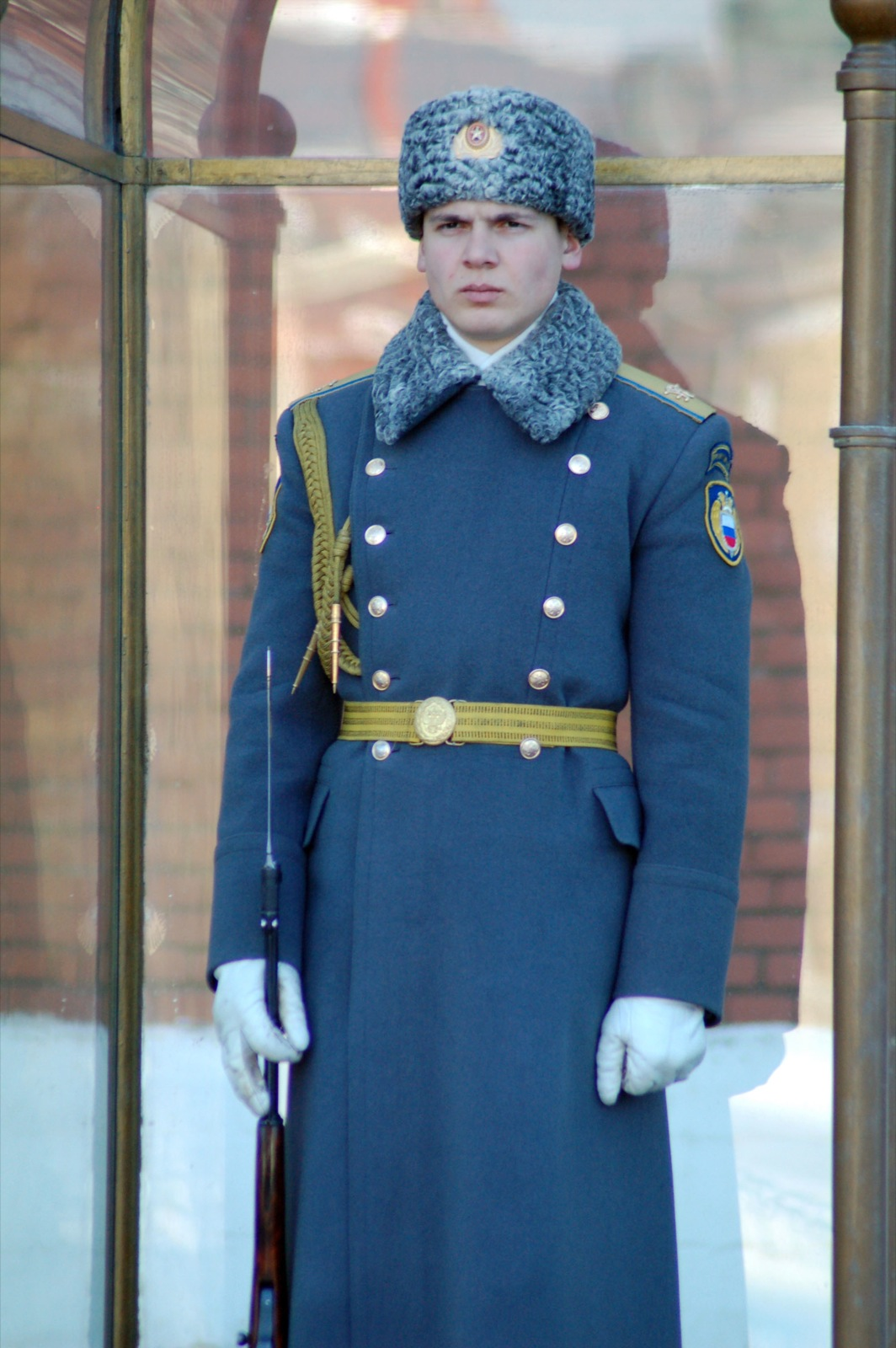
A soldier of the Kremlin Regiment of the commandant's office at the Post No. 1

The Commandant's Office of the Moscow Kremlin (Russian: Служба коменданта Московского Кремля) is an administration unit of the Federal Protective Service of Russia. Its duties include inspecting visitors to the Kremlin and providing security to the Kremlin interior and buildings exterior from the Kremlin Wall such as Lenin's Mausoleum. Internally, has authority over the operation of certain Kremlin museums. The Commandant of the Moscow Kremlin is the operational head of the office. It has direct control over the Kremlin Regiment, which notably maintains a permanent honor guard at the eternal flame of the Tomb of the Unknown Soldier.

== History ==
In 1918, the new leadership of the RSFSR moved to the Moscow Kremlin, the protection of which was immediately carried out by the commandant's office of the Moscow Kremlin. Until January 1936, the office was not included in the command structure of either the Red Army or the NKVD, being subordinate to the military department on the Rights of the sector of the Moscow Military District. On 28 January 1936, it was transferred from the People's Commissariat of Defense of the Soviet Union and was renamed to the Office of the Moscow Kremlin Commandant of the NKVD. In early 1938, the managing of the Kremlin's museum complex was transferred to the Commandant's Office. At the beginning of the Great Patriotic War in 1941, the personnel of the office were given the combat mission of the protection of the Kremlin's against the invading troops of the Wehrmacht. Later on, by decree of the Presidium of the Supreme Soviet, many of the office's personnel were awarded orders and medals of the Soviet Union. At the end of the war, the personnel of the commandant were given the new tasks of ensuring the security of the state leaders. On 14 March 1953 approved a new structure of the Ministry of Internal Affairs, which had a central office. On 20 April 1955 the Government decided on free public access to the Kremlin. Since 2004, the Presidential Regiment has been under the direction of the commandant of the Moscow Kremlin. It has recently received congratulations in recent years by the President of Russia on its 75th, 90th and 100th anniversaries.

== Commandant of the Moscow Kremlin ==
The following have served as military commandants:

- Pavel Malkov (March 1918—April 1920)
- Sergey Shornikov (10 July 1967 – 11 September 1986)
- Gennady Bashkin (11 September 1986 - 22 August 1991)
- Mikhail Barsukov (10 December 1991 – 24 July 1995)
- Sergey Strygin (29 July 1995-January 2004)
- Lieutenant General Sergey Khlebnikov (January 2004-February 2020)
- Major General Sergey Udovenko (since February 2020)

Former commandant Sergey Khlebnikov was notably a member of the public council of the Spasskaya Tower Military Music Festival and Tattoo. One of the Kremlin towers is known as the Commandant's Tower (Комендантская башня), which originated in the early 19th century, when the Moscow Commandant took up residence in the Poteshny Palace, near the tower.

== See also ==
- Kremlin Regiment
- Warsaw Garrison Command
