= Tomb of the Unknown Soldier (Moscow) =

World War II memorial in Russia

Coordinates: 55°45′17″N 37°36′58″E

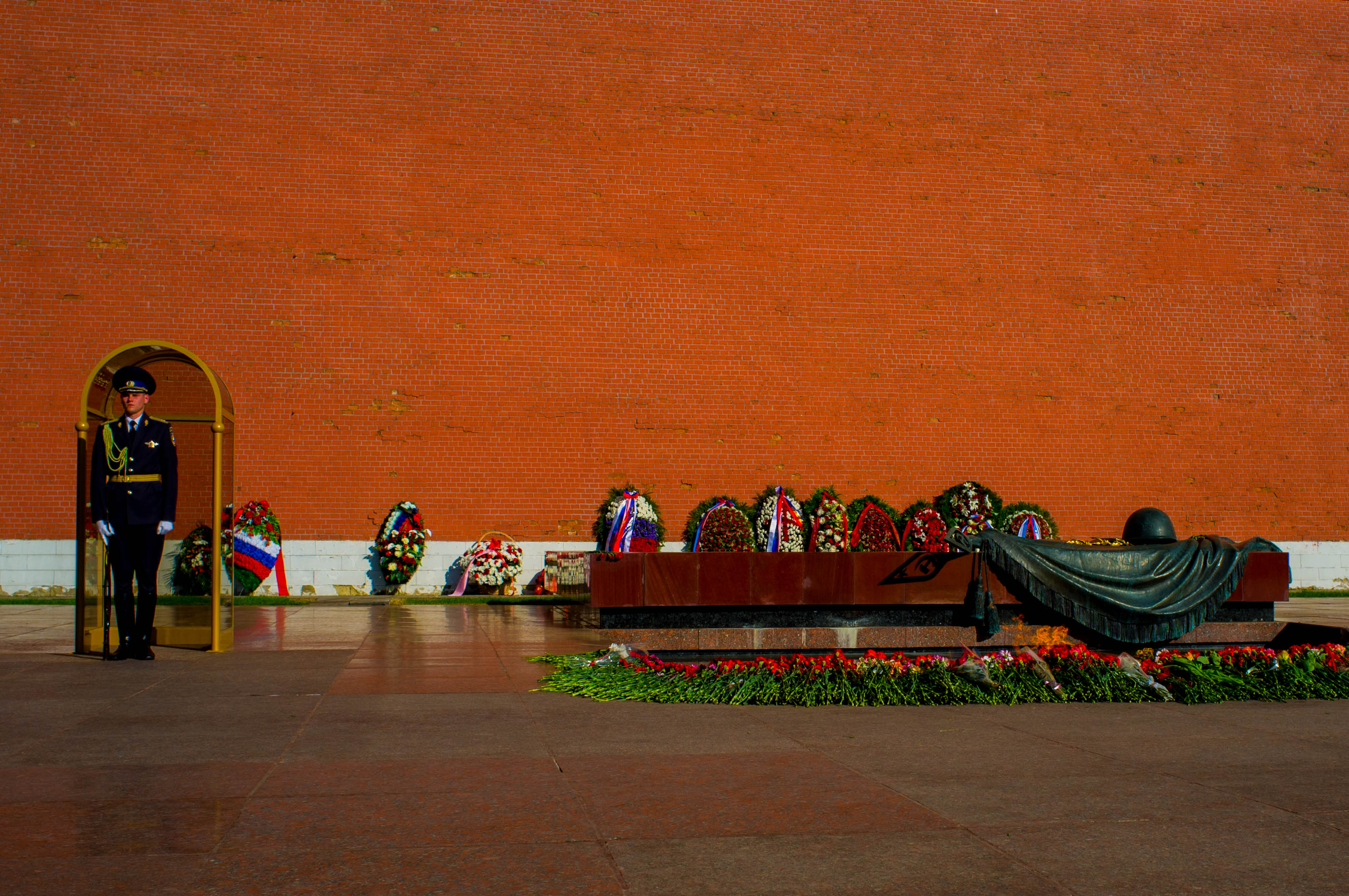
General view of the Tomb with Post No. 1

Changing of the Guard

The Tomb of the Unknown Soldier (Russian: Могила Неизвестного Солдата, IPA: [mɐˈɡʲilə nʲɪɪˈzvʲɛsnəvə sɐlˈdatə]) is a war memorial in the Alexander Garden in Moscow near the Kremlin dedicated to the Soviet soldiers killed during World War II. It was designed by architects D. I. Burdin, V. A. Klimov, Yu. R. Rabayev and sculptor Nikolai Tomsky.

== History ==
The remains of the unknown soldiers killed in the Battle of Moscow in 1941 were initially buried in a mass grave of the Shtyki Memorial at the 40th km of the Leningrad highway at the city of Zelenograd. This was the location of the closest approach of the German armies to Moscow during the war. To commemorate the 25th anniversary of the battle, in December 1966 these remains were relocated to the Kremlin Wall.

In 1997, the Post No. 1 Guard of the Kremlin Regiment (which had guarded the Lenin Mausoleum) was restored at the Tomb of the Unknown Soldier by the federal law of December 8, 1997, "On Immortalizing the Soviet People’s Victory in the Great Patriotic War of 1941–1945". A Changing of the Guard ceremony takes place every hour.

The day of celebration for the unknown soldiers of the Eastern Front has been celebrated in Russia since December 3, 2014. After World War II, millions of Russian soldiers were reported missing, or pronounced dead. The monument was unveiled to the public on May 8, 1967.

== Restoration ==
The ensemble of the memorial was renewed several times. By the 30th anniversary of the Victory Day celebrations, the monument was fully restored and various elements were added; at that time, a laurel branch and a helmet by Nikolai Tomsky appeared.

By the decree of President Dmitry Medvedev dated November 17, 2009, the monument was given the status of a Nationwide Memorial of Military Glory. In the same year, the Presidential Affairs Department announced the beginning of its large-scale reconstruction, the aim of which was to preserve the original appearance of the complex. Then the intention was announced to install a new stele with the names of the cities of military glory.

The return of the flame to the Alexandrovsky garden took place on 23 February 2010, in the presence of Dmitry Medvedev. The reconstruction of the memorial complex was completed by Victory Day the same year. On 8 May, the National Memorial of Military Glory was inaugurated by the presidents of Russia, Belarus and Ukraine.

== Appearance ==
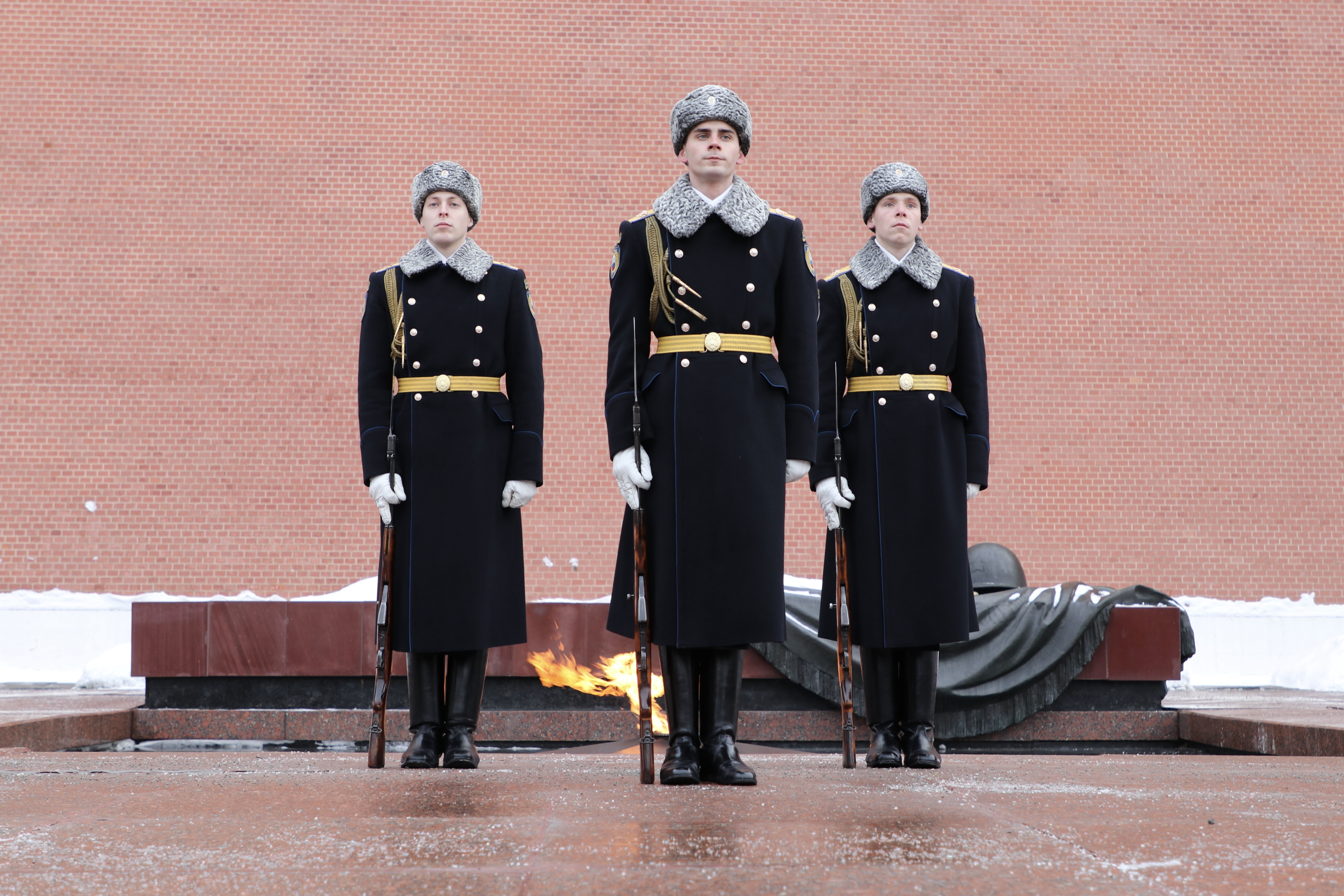
The Presidential Regiment, 2022

The dark red porphyry monument is decorated with a bronze sculpture of a laurel branch and a soldier's helmet laid upon a banner. In front of the monument, there is a five-pointed star in a square field of labradorite, which emanates the Eternal Flame from its center. The flame illuminates a bronze inscription "Имя твоё неизвестно, подвиг твой бессмертен" (translit.: Imya tvoyo neizvestno, podvig tvoy bessmerten, "Your name is unknown, your deed is immortal"). The torch for the memorial's Eternal Flame was transported from Leningrad (now Saint Petersburg), where it had been lit from the Eternal Flame at the Monument to the Fighters of the Revolution on the Field of Mars. To the left of the tomb is a granite wall with an inlay stating: "1941 – To Those Who Have Fallen For The Motherland – 1945".

To the right of the tomb, lining the walkway are dark red porphyry blocks with incapsulated soils from hero cities, Leningrad, Kiev, Minsk, Stalingrad, Odessa, Sevastopol, Kerch, Novorossiysk, Tula, Brest, Murmansk and Smolensk. The plate for "Stalingrad" read "Volgograd" until September 2004. Further to the right of these monuments is an obelisk in red granite, listing the names of 40 "Cities of Military Glory" divided into groups of four. This monument was dedicated on May 8, 2010.

== See also ==
- Tomb of the Unknown Soldier (Tashkent)
