= Ninth Chief Directorate (KGB) =

KGB Directorate Tasked with protecting Soviet Government officials

- Девятое управление КГБ СССР

Agency overview
- Formed: 18 March 1954
- Dissolved: 29 February 1990
- Superseding agency: Federal Protective Service
- Headquarters: Kremlin Presidium, Moscow, Soviet Union
- Parent agency: KGB

The Ninth Chief Directorate (Russian: Девя́тое управле́ние, romanized: Devyatoye upranvlenie), colloquially known as the Devyatka (Девятка), was a security force of the KGB responsible for the protection of high-ranking Communist Party of the Soviet Union (CPSU) members and important government facilities such as nuclear weapons stocks. It consisted of 40,000 uniformed troops that provided bodyguard services to the CPSU leadership and their families, operated the Moscow VIP subway system, and the Vertushka secure government telephone system that linked high-level government and CPSU officers.

The Ninth Directorate was dissolved in 1990 during the dissolution of the Soviet Union and replaced by the independent Main Guard Directorate of the Russian Federation in 1991 which was re-organized into the Federal Protective Service of Russia in 1996.

== History ==
The Ninth Directorate of the KGB of the USSR was established by the decree of the Presidium of the Supreme Soviet of March 18, 1954. The 9th Directorate of the KGB under the Council of Ministers of the USSR was tasked with protecting the leaders of the party and government. The Directorate was responsible for protecting the country's top officials and the most important government and party facilities. It was in charge of the dachas and all vacation spots of the leaders of the party and government.

Initially, the Directorate was located in the Lubyanka Building on Dzerzhinsky Square. In March 1967, it was transferred to Building No. 14 of the Moscow Kremlin.

Abolished on February 29, 1990. The KGB Security Service was created on its basis, while its economic divisions were consolidated into the Special Operational and Technical Directorate under the Economic Directorate of the KGB of the USSR.

On August 22, 1991, the Service was separated from the KGB and transformed into the Security Directorate under the Office of the President of the USSR. The actual successor of the 9th Directorate and the Security Service of the KGB is the Federal Protective Service (formed on the basis of the Main Security Directorate of the Russian Federation).

== Organization ==
By 1990, the structure of the Ninth Directorate was as follows:

- Management (chief, deputy chiefs, party committee, Komsomol committee)
- Secretariat
- 1st department (personal security)
- 2nd department (counterintelligence)
- 3rd department (economic)
- 4th department (engineering and construction)
- 5th department (security of the Kremlin and the road)
- 6th department (special kitchen)
- 7th department (state dachas in the Moscow Oblast and mansions on the Lenin Hills)
- 8th department (automobile)
- 9th department in Crimea (state dachas in Crimea)
- 9th department in the Caucasus (state dachas in the Caucasus)
- 11th department (reserve state dachas)
- Department of service and combat training
- Operational and technical department
- Personnel department
- Commandant's Office of the Moscow Kremlin
- Commandant's office for the protection of buildings of the Central Committee of the CPSU

== Directors ==
- Vladimir Ustinov (17 March 1954 — 25 December 1957)
- Nikolai Zakharov (17 February 1958 — 3 December 1961)
- Vladimir Chekalov (8 December 1961 — 2 June 1967)
- Sergei Antonov (22 February 1968 — 16 August 1974)
- Yuri Storozhev (19 August 1974 — 24 March 1983)
- Yuri Plekhanov (24 March 1983 — 29 February 1990)

== See also ==
- United States Secret Service
- Reichssicherheitsdienst
- SS-Begleitkommando des Führers
