= Bell tower (disambiguation) =

A bell tower is a tower that contains or is designed to contain one or more bells.

Bell tower may also refer to:

== Architecture and towers ==
=== Styles ===
- Bell tower (wat), in Thai architecture
- Bell tower (Chinese Buddhism), in Han Chinese Buddhist temple design

=== Individual structures ===
- Bell Tower (Edmonton), an office tower in Edmonton, Canada
- Bell tower (Königsberg), Germany
- Bell Tower (Pennsylvania Railroad), Marcus Hook, Pennsylvania, US
- Bell Tower (University of Portland), Oregon, US
- Bell Tower of Xi'an, a Zhonglou (Bell Tower) in Xi'an, China
- Gulou and Zhonglou (Beijing), a Zhonglou (Bell Tower) in Beijing, China
- Ivan the Great Bell Tower in the Kremlin, Moscow, Russia
- Swan Bells, a campanile in Perth, Western Australia
- Bell Tower, also known as Kissing Couple, in Colorado, US
- The Bell Tower or Campanile, Portmeirion, Wales

== Fiction ==
- The Bell-Tower, one of Herman Melville's Piazza Tales
- Bell Tower, a location in the games Pokémon HeartGold and SoulSilver

== Film and TV ==
- Jonggak (The Bell Tower, subtitled Missing another Dawn), Korean film with Heo Jang-kang
- The Bell Tower, 1953 TV episode Foreign Intrigue
- The Bell Tower, episode of Heidi (2007 TV series)
- The Bell Tower, an episode of the American television series Outer Banks

== Media outlets ==
- The Bell Tower Times, Australian media company

== Music ==
- The Bell Tower, a chamber opera by Ernst Krenek after Melville's story
- Bell Tower (band), Canadian alternative rock
- The Belltower, American alternative rock group

== See also ==
- Belfry (disambiguation)
