= Belfry (disambiguation) =

Belfry may refer to:

== Architecture ==
- Belfry (architecture), a structure enclosing bells
  - Bell tower, the building upon which the bell enclosure sits, often called a belfry
    - Bell tower (wat), a Thai architectural structure
- Belfry, a type of medieval siege tower

== Places ==
- Belfry, Montana, U.S.
- Belfry, Pennsylvania, U.S.
- Belfry Mountain, in New York, U.S.

== Other uses ==
- Belfry Theatre, in Victoria, British Columbia, Canada
- The Belfry, a golf club in Wishaw, Warwickshire, England
- The Belfry (Germantown Academy), an American high school dramatic society
- The Belfry (shopping centre), in Redhill, Surrey, England
- Belfry, a 1991 play in The Wexford Trilogy by Billy Roche

== See also ==
- Bats in the belfry (disambiguation)
- Belfries of Belgium and France, a UNESCO World Heritage Site
