= Moscow Kremlin Wall =

Defensive wall around the Moscow Kremlin

Coordinates: 55°44′57″N 37°37′0″E

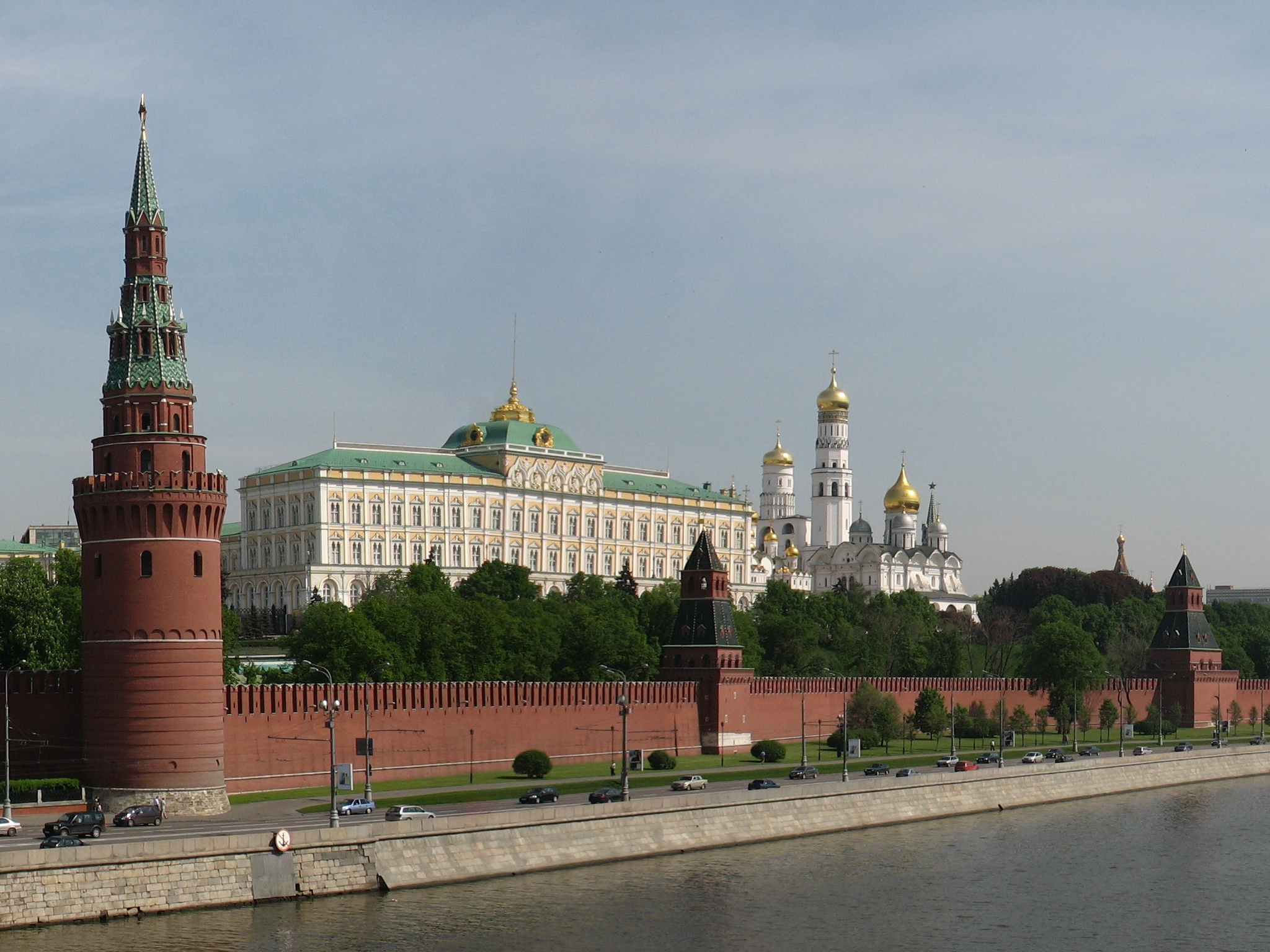
A view of the Moscow Kremlin

The Moscow Kremlin Wall is a defensive wall that surrounds the Moscow Kremlin, recognisable by the characteristic notches and its Kremlin towers. The original walls were likely a simple wooden fence with guard towers built in 1156. The Kremlin walls, like many cathedrals in the Kremlin, were built by Italian architects.

== History ==
One of the most symbolic constructions in Russia's history, the Moscow Kremlin Wall can be traced back to the 12th century when Moscow was founded in 1147. The original outpost was surrounded by the first walls in 1156, built by Yuri Dolgoruki, prince of Suzdal, which were most likely a simple wooden fence with guard towers. Destroyed in 1238 by the Mongol-Tartar invasion, the Moscow Kremlin was rebuilt by the Russian Knyaz Ivan Kalita. In 1339-1340 he erected a bigger fortress on the site of the original outpost which was defended by massive oak walls. Thought to be an impenetrable defence from raids, it was proven to be useless against raids which burned Moscow in 1365.

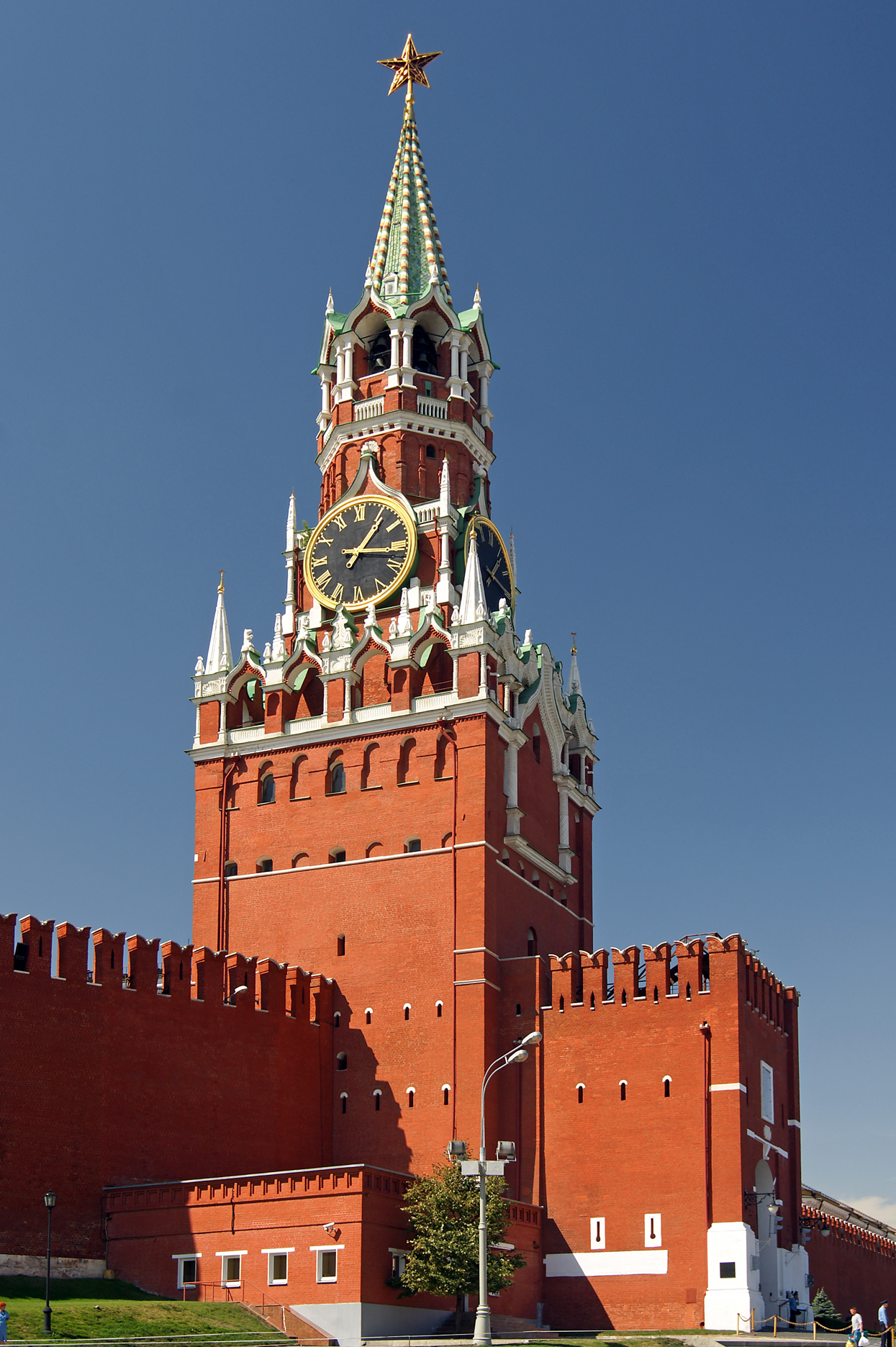
The famous Spasskaya Tower, with its ruby star added in 1937.

Nevertheless, the young knyaz Dmitry Donskoy in 1367 began a rebuilding of the fortress. All winter long from the Mukachyovo village 30 virsts (country miles) from Moscow, limestone was hauled back on sledges, allowing the construction of the first stone walls to begin the following spring. The walls successfully withstood two sieges during the Lithuanian–Muscovite War (1368–72). Within a few years the city was adorned with beautiful white-stone walls. Whilst it was successfully invaded by the Tatars again in 1382, the massive fortification suffered no damage.

Dmitry Donskoy's walls stood for over a century, and it was during this period that Muscovy rose as the dominant power in Northeastern Rus. By the end of the 15th century, however, it was clear that the old constructions had long passed their time and Czar Ivan the Great's visions. Between 1485 and 1495 a whole brigade of Italian architects took part in the erection of a new defence perimeter including Antonio Fryazin (Antonio Gilardi), Marko Fryazin (Marco Ruffo), Pyotr Fryazin (Pietro Antonio Solari) and Alexei Fryazin the Old (Aloisio da Milano). (The term Fryazin was used to refer to all people of Italian origin at this time). The new walls were erected by building on top of the older walls (some white stone can still be seen at the base in some places). The thickness and height was dramatically increased requiring many wooden houses which surrounded the Kremlin to be torn down.

In the following centuries Moscow expanded rapidly outside the Kremlin walls and as Russia's borders became more and more secure their defensive duty has all but passed. The cannons which were installed in the walls were removed after the turn of the 17th century, as was the second, smaller wall which repeated the perimeter on the outside. During the reign of Czar Alexei Romanov, the towers were built up with decorative spires and the walls were restored. However their historical mightiness was dampened as the material became brick not stone. Successive restorations of varying scale took place during the reigns of Empress Elizabeth and Alexander the First as well as the later Soviet and Russian times, preserving their original character and style.

== Specifications ==
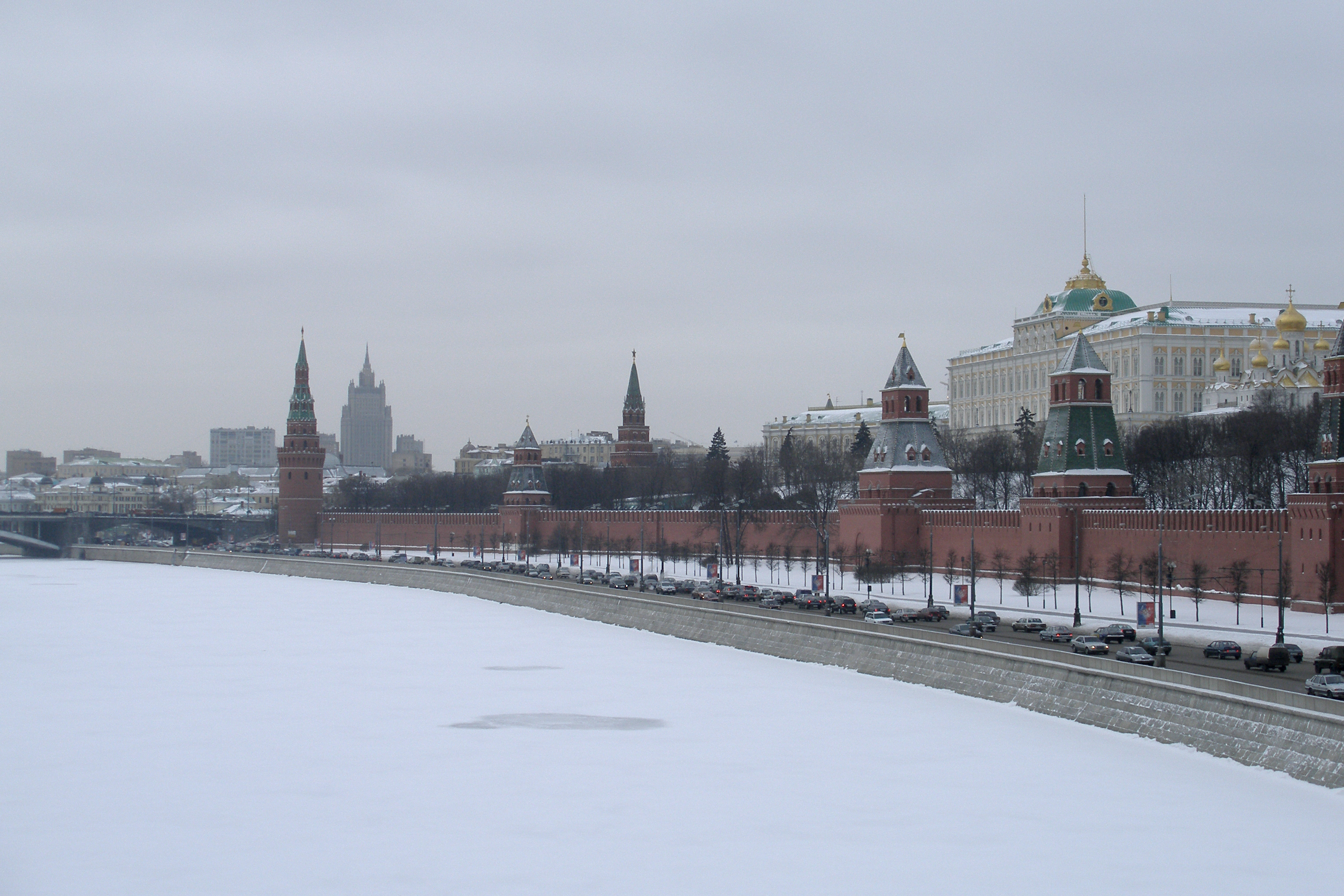
The wall by the Moskva river

With an outer perimeter of 2,235 metres (7,333 ft), the Kremlin appears as a loose triangle, deviating from the geometric ideal on the southern side where instead of a straight line, it repeats the contours on the original hill on which the Kremlin rests. Because of this the vertical profile is by no means uniform, and the height at some places ranges from no more than 5 metres (16 ft) quadrupling to 19 metres (62 ft) elsewhere. The thickness of the walls also varies from 3.5 to 6.5 metres (11 to 21 ft).

The top of the walls, along their entire length, have outwardly-invisible battle platforms which also range from 2 to 4.5 metres (6 ft 7 in to 14 ft 9 in) in width (in proportion to the thickness). A total of 1,045 double-horned notched "teeth" crown the top of the walls, with a height ranging from 2 to 2.5 metres (6 ft 7 in to 8 ft 2 in) and thickness from 65 to 75 centimetres (26 to 30 in).

Some of the interior corridors inside the walls have rooms with no exterior illumination (kamoras) where particularly dangerous criminals were contained.

To date twenty towers survived, highlighting the walls. Built at a different time, the oldest one, Tainitskaya dates to 1485 whilst the newest one-Tsarskaya to 1680. Three of the towers, located in the corners of the castle have unique circular profiles. From the ground level it is only possible to enter six of the towers, the rest only from the walls.

Four gate towers exist, all crowned with ruby stars, they are Spasskaya, Borovitskaya, Troitskaya and Nikolskaya. Although up to the 1930 it was also possible to enter the Kremlin via the gates of Tainitskaya tower, however these were covered up yet leaving their portal clearly visible.

The main gates in the Spasskaya tower are normally (with the exception of official and religious ceremonies) closed to the public. The gates under the Nikolskaya tower are often used for service duties only. Visitors to the Kremlin normally enter the premises via the gates under the Troitksaya tower, except for those who wish to visit the Armoury chamber and the Treasury fond, which are accessible via the gates of the Borovitskaya tower.

Before 1917 it was also possible to book an excursion, lasting over two hours, to walk along the perimeter of the Kremlin walls, beginning at the Borovitskaya tower.

The southern part of the wall faces the Moskva River. The eastern part faces Red Square. The western part, formerly facing the Neglinnaya River, is now part of the Alexander Garden. The bridge which previously crossed the river still stands, and is done in the same style as the Kremlin wall.

== Restoration ==
Various sections of the Moscow Kremlin Wall are periodically restored and the condition of the battlements is constantly monitored. In 2015, the largest restoration in recent memory began. Brickwork and white stone decorations were repaired along the 500-metre stretch. Some of the bricks were replaced with new ones made of the same materials using the old technology. Waterproofing works were carried out. For the first time in 150 years, the Troitskaya Tower was restored. In 2016, restoration work was carried out on a 500-metre-long section of the wall.

As part of the restoration, the Borovitskaya Tower was renovated and preparations were made to preserve three unique relief white-stone emblems on its outer corners. One of them is the oldest known emblem of the Moscow state in the era of Ivan III, established during the construction of the tower in 1490. It is planned to restore the removed drawing and transfer it to the Moscow Kremlin Museum for safekeeping, and a copy is to be made for the Borovitskaya Tower.

Kremlin walls are studied by non-destructive methods, for example, using geophysical radars and pits. During the pits, wooden piles used by ancient builders to compact soils were found. It was also during this period that the bases of the walls were examined for the first time. It was found out that the foundation was 7–11 metres deep and there were also found pieces of granite, presumably from Valday.

== See also ==
- Kremlin Wall Necropolis
