= Kremlin Clock =

Historic clock on the Spasskaya Tower

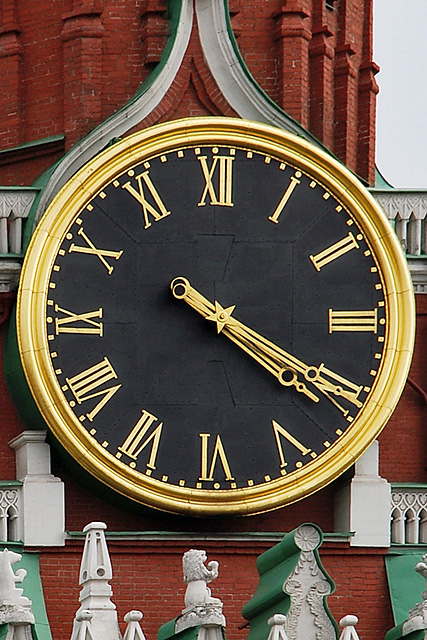
The clock of the Moscow Kremlin

The Kremlin Clock (Russian: Кремлёвские часы, romanized: Kremlyovskiye chasy) or Kremlin Chimes (Russian: Кремлёвские куранты, romanized: Kremlyovskiye kuranty), also known colloquially in the West as Moscow Clock Tower, is a historic clock on the Spasskaya Tower of Moscow Kremlin. The clock dial is above the main gates to Red Square. For decades, the chimes have rung on the quarter-hour, with bells tolling for each full hour.

== Early history ==
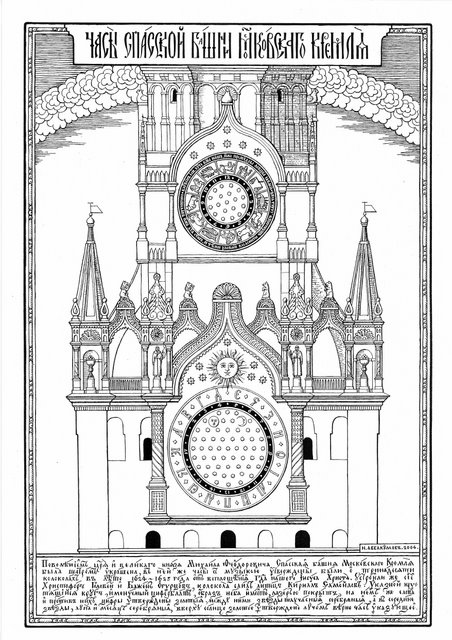
Diagram of the clock's earliest known form

The clock face of the Spasskaya Tower clock, was formerly divided into 17 equal parts, each corresponding to one hour of daylight on the longest day of the year, the summer solstice. The clock featured an image of the sun suspended on the centered upper portion of the clock face above the dial, with its "static" hour-hand in the form of an elongated beam of sunlight, indicating the hours. The clock face was labeled with the Cyrillic numerals and rotated in counter-clockwise sens. The characters were about 71 centimetres (28 in) tall (one arshin), cast in brass and covered with gold leaf. The Clock face of the drawing of the Spasskaya Tower on the right, is marking half past four.

In 1585, clocks were in use at three of the Kremlin's gates, Spasskaya, Taynitskaya and Troitskaya Towers, exemplifying the use of clocks as early as the 16th century. There are mentions from 1613–1614 of a clock at the Nikolskaya Tower as well. In 1614 the clock at the Frolovskaya Tower was maintained by Nikiforka Nikitin. In September 1624 some old wartime clocks were sold to the Yaroslavl' Jesus Transfiguration Monastery.

In 1625, under the leadership of Scottish engineer and clockmaker Christopher Galloway, the Russian clockmakers Zhdan, his son Shumilo Zhdanov, and his grandson Alexey Shumilov completed the new clock. The thirteen bells for the clock mechanism were cast by the blacksmith Cyril Samoilov. The clocks were burned down in the fire of 1626, but they were later restored by Galloway. In 1668 the clocks underwent a refit to "play music" on the hour, at sunrise, and at sunset, using special mechanisms.

== History ==
In 1706, a new clock was installed. It was purchased by Peter the Great, in Holland, transported from Amsterdam to Moscow in 30 wagons, and installed by watchmaker Ekim Garnov. It had a 12-hour dial on the clock face. The new clock served, with some interruptions, until the middle of 19th century. It was damaged by fire in 1737 and was not restored until 1767. From 1770, it played the German melody "Oh, you dear Augustin". During the Moscow fire of 1812 the clock was again damaged.

The modern Kremlin Clock was remodeled in 1851, by the Butenop brothers in Moscow. For more melodious ringing tones, 24 bells were removed from the Trinity and Borovitskaya Towers and moved to the Spasskaya Tower. Most of the restoration work on the tower itself was done at the same time under the direction of the architect Gerasimov. The metal floors, stairs, and clock pedestal were made according to drawings by Russian architect Konstantin Thon, the designer of the Cathedral of Christ the Savior. From then on, the chimes played the "March of the Preobrazhensky regiment" at 12 and 6 o'clock, while at 3 and 9 o'clock it played the anthem "How Glorious is Our Lord in Zion" by Dmitry Bortniansky. Initially, the national anthem "God Save The Tsar!" was proposed, but Tsar Nicholas I forbade it, stating that "the chimes can play any song except for the anthem". In 1913, for the 300th anniversary of the Romanov dynasty, a new restoration of the clock was carried out.

On 2 November 1917, during the storming of the Kremlin by the Bolsheviks, the clock was hit by a shell and stopped. One of the hands was broken and the mechanism controlling the rotation of the hands was damaged. The clock stopped for nearly a year. In August–September 1918, at the direction of Lenin, the clock was repaired by watchmaker N. Behrens. With great difficulty, a new 32 kilograms (71 lb) pendulum was made of gold-plated lead. At the direction of the new government, artist and musician Mikhail Cheremnykh was commissioned to compose new revolutionary music for the clock to play. It played the Internationale at noon and "You Fell A Victim" at midnight.

In 1932 the Kremlin Clock was again restored. A new face was installed, an exact copy of the original. The rim, numbers and hands were covered with gold (28 kg of gold in all). The use of the Internationale was the only thing left unchanged. However, from 1938 the chimes were silent and played no tunes. The clock simply struck the hours and quarter-hours, as a Special Commission recognized that the sound of the musical chimes had become unsatisfactory, because the chime mechanism was worn and seasonal frosts had severely distorted the sound.

The clock of the Moscow Kremlin rings in 2012. The melody heard before the striking is played alone once on the first quarter-hour, twice on the half-hour, and three times on the third quarter-hour. The phrase is played four times on the full hour, followed by the strikes. After the strikes, sometimes an additional tune is played; usually a short phrase from the national anthem.

In 1941, specifically for a performance of the Internationale, a special electromechanical drive was installed and later dismantled. In 1944, at the direction of Joseph Stalin, unsuccessful attempts were made to reset the clock to play the new National Anthem of the Soviet Union.

Major restoration of the chimes and the entire clock mechanism was carried out in 1974. The mechanism was stopped for 100 days, completely disassembled, and restored, replacing some old parts. However, the mechanism of the musical bells remained unrestored.

In 1991 the Plenum of the Central Committee decided to resume work on the Kremlin chimes, but it turned out that they were three bells short of what was needed for the Soviet national anthem. This problem arose again in 1995. "Patriotic Song" by Mikhail Glinka was adopted as the new national anthem. In 1996, during the inauguration of Boris Yeltsin, the Kremlin clock played a tune once more, after 58 years of silence. In the absence of a few bells needed to perform the national anthem, metal beats were installed in addition to the bells. At noon and midnight, the chimes played "Patriotic Song", while at every three hours, they played the melody of the chorus "Glory, Glory to you, holy Rus'!" from the opera A Life for the Tsar (also by Glinka). The last major restoration was carried out in 1999 after six months' planning. The hands and numbers were re-gilded. Instead of "Patriotic Song", the chimes played the new National Anthem of Russia that had been approved in 2000.

== Technical parameters ==
The Kremlin clock faces have a diameter of 6.12 metres (20.1 ft) and are placed on all four sides of the Spasskaya tower. The Roman numerals are 0.72 m (2.4 ft) tall. The length of the hour hand is 2.97 m (9.7 ft), and of the minute hand 3.27 m (10.7 ft). The total weight of clock and bells is 25 tons. The mechanism is powered by 3 weights, weighing between 160 and 224 kilograms (353 and 494 lb). Accuracy is achieved by a pendulum weighing 32 kg (71 lb). Transfer from winter to summer time was done manually. The chimes consist of bells located at the top of the tower, right above the clock.

=== Chimes ===
The melody heard before the striking is played alone once on the first quarter-hour, twice on the half-hour, and three times on the third quarter-hour. The phrase is played four times on the full hour, followed by the strikes. The melody is believed to be known as "Malinovsky chimes". Usually, an additional tune is played after the main melody and the strikes, normally every three hours.

At noon, midnight, 6 am and 6 pm the chimes plays the national anthem after the hour strikes, while at 3 a.m., 9 a.m., 3 p.m. and 9 p.m. it plays the "Glory" chorus from Glinka's opera A Life for the Tsar. The clock is set twice a day. The original clock was wound by hand, but from 1937, it was done using three electric motors.

Prior to the adoption of State Anthem of the Russian Federation in 2000, the chimes played an excerpt of Patrioticheskaya Pesnya throughout the 1990s.
