= Ivan the Great Bell Tower =

Church tower in Moscow, Russia

- Колокольня Ивана Великого
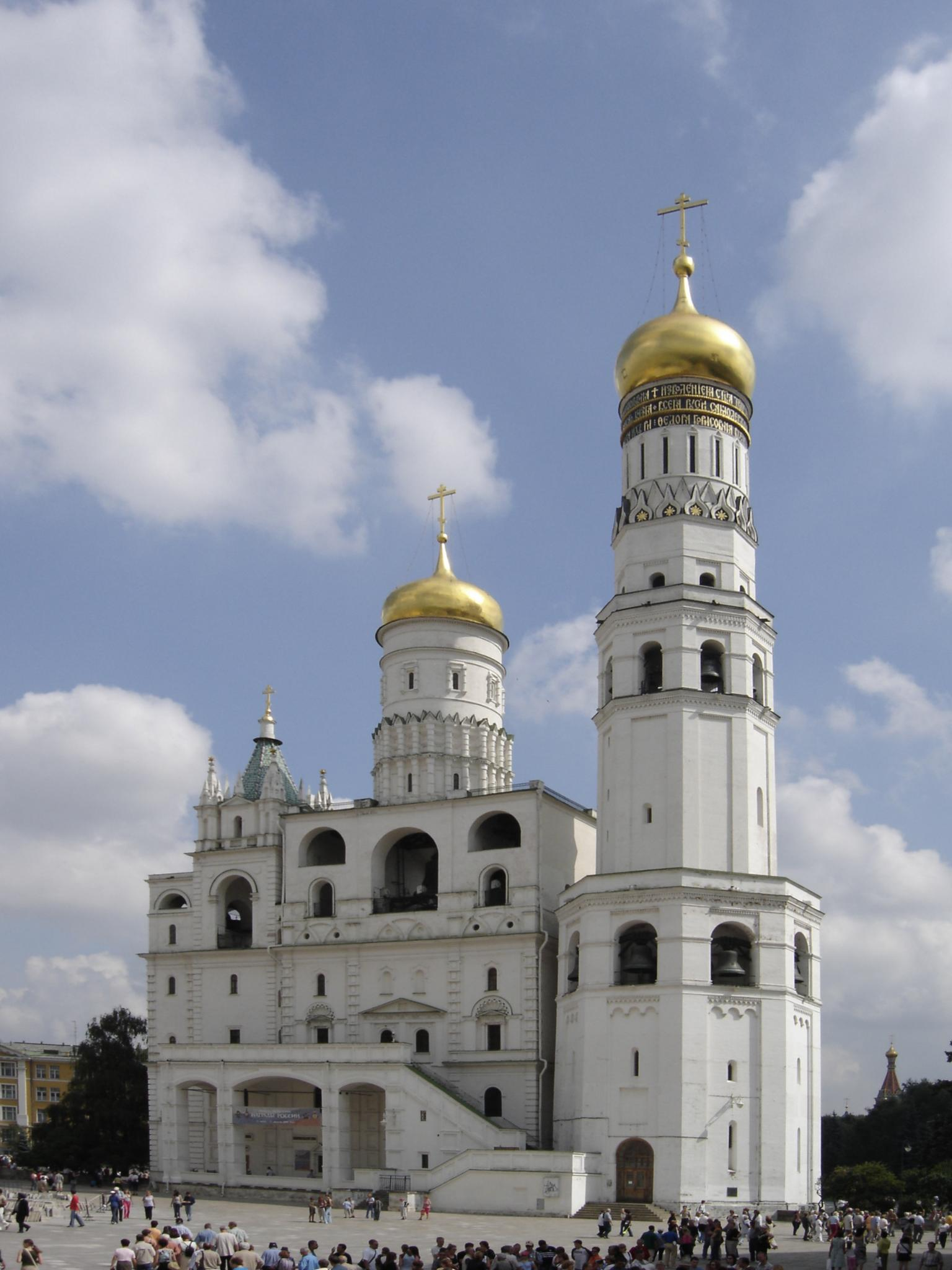
- Ivan the Great Bell Tower, with Assumption Belfry on the left
- Ivan the Great Bell Tower
- 55°45′3″N 37°37′5″E
- Location: Moscow
- Country: Russia
- Denomination: Russian Orthodox
- Website: www.kreml.ru

Architecture
- Style: Russian
- Completed: 1508; 518 years ago

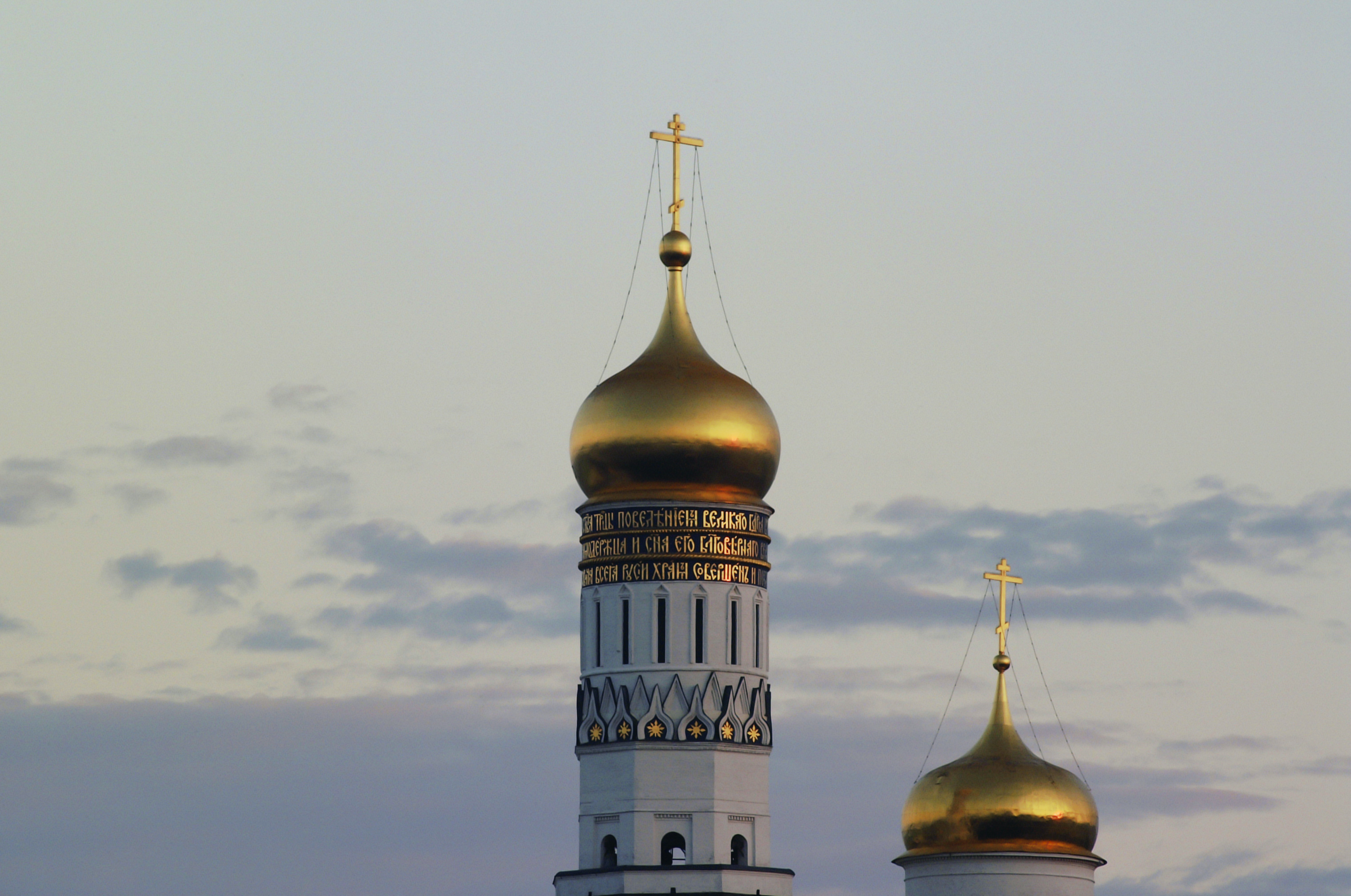
Ivan the Great Bell Tower - Cupola

The Ivan the Great Bell Tower (Russian: Колокольня Иван Великий, romanized: Kolokol'nya Ivan Velikiy) is a church tower inside the Moscow Kremlin complex. With a total height of 81 metres (266 ft), it is the tallest tower and structure of the Kremlin. It was built in 1508 on Cathedral Square for the three Russian Orthodox cathedrals, namely the Assumption (closest to the tower), the Archangel and the Annunciation, which do not have their own belfries. It serves as a part of Moscow Kremlin Museums.

== History ==
From 1329, Moscow's first stone bell tower stood on this site, affiliated with the Church of St. Ivan of the Ladder-under-the Bell, hence the name "Ivan" in the title. This church was erected by Grand Duke Ivan Kalita, and was one of the first to be built in Moscow out of stone, rather than wood. During Grand Duke Ivan III’s major renovation of the Kremlin, he hired an Italian architect to replace this church. Construction was begun in 1505, the year of Ivan’s death, and was completed three years later under his son Vasily III. Vasilly also ordered that a new and unprecedentedly large tower be erected on the foundations of the old tower as a monument to honour his father.

The new bell tower, completed in 1508, originally had two belfries on different levels and a height of around 60 meters. Because of its height, the tower also served as an observation point against fires and the approach of enemies.

There's a popular yet disputable legend, that when Napoleon captured Moscow in 1812 after the Battle of Borodino, he heard that the cross on the central dome of the Annunciation Cathedral had been cast in solid gold, and immediately gave orders that it should be taken down. But he confused the cathedral with the Ivan the Great Bell Tower, which only had a gilded iron cross. This cross resisted all attempts of French equipment and engineers to remove it from the tower. It was only after a Russian peasant volunteered to climb up to the dome that the cross was lowered on a rope. When he went up to Napoleon seeking a reward, the latter had him shot out of hand as a traitor to his fatherland.

== Architecture ==
The Ivan the Great Bell Tower is an ensemble with three components. All of the buildings are made of brick, and are whitewashed in accord with the neighboring buildings of Cathedral Square.

== Bells ==
The Ivan the Great Bell Tower today contains 22 bells. Of these, 18 small bells hang in the base and in the middle of the bell tower.

== Bibliography ==
- Klein, Mina. The Kremlin: Citadel of History. MacMillan Publishing Company (1973). ISBN 0-02-750830-7
- Tropkin, Alexander. The Moscow Kremlin: history of Russia's unique monument. Publishing House "Russkaya Zhizn" (1980). ASIN: B0010XM7BQ

Records
Preceded by None	Tallest Building in the Russian Empire; 1721—1733; 81.1 m	Succeeded by Peter and Paul Cathedral
Preceded by None	Tallest Building in the Tsardom of Russia; 1547—1721; 81.1 m	Succeeded by None
Preceded by Troitskaya Tower	Tallest Building in the Grand Duchy of Moscow; 1508—1547; 81.1 m	Succeeded by None
Preceded by Troitskaya Tower	Tallest Building in Moscow; 1508—1952; 81.1 m	Succeeded by Kotelnicheskaya Embankment Building
