= Christopher Galloway =

Scottish engineer and architect (fl. 1621–1645)

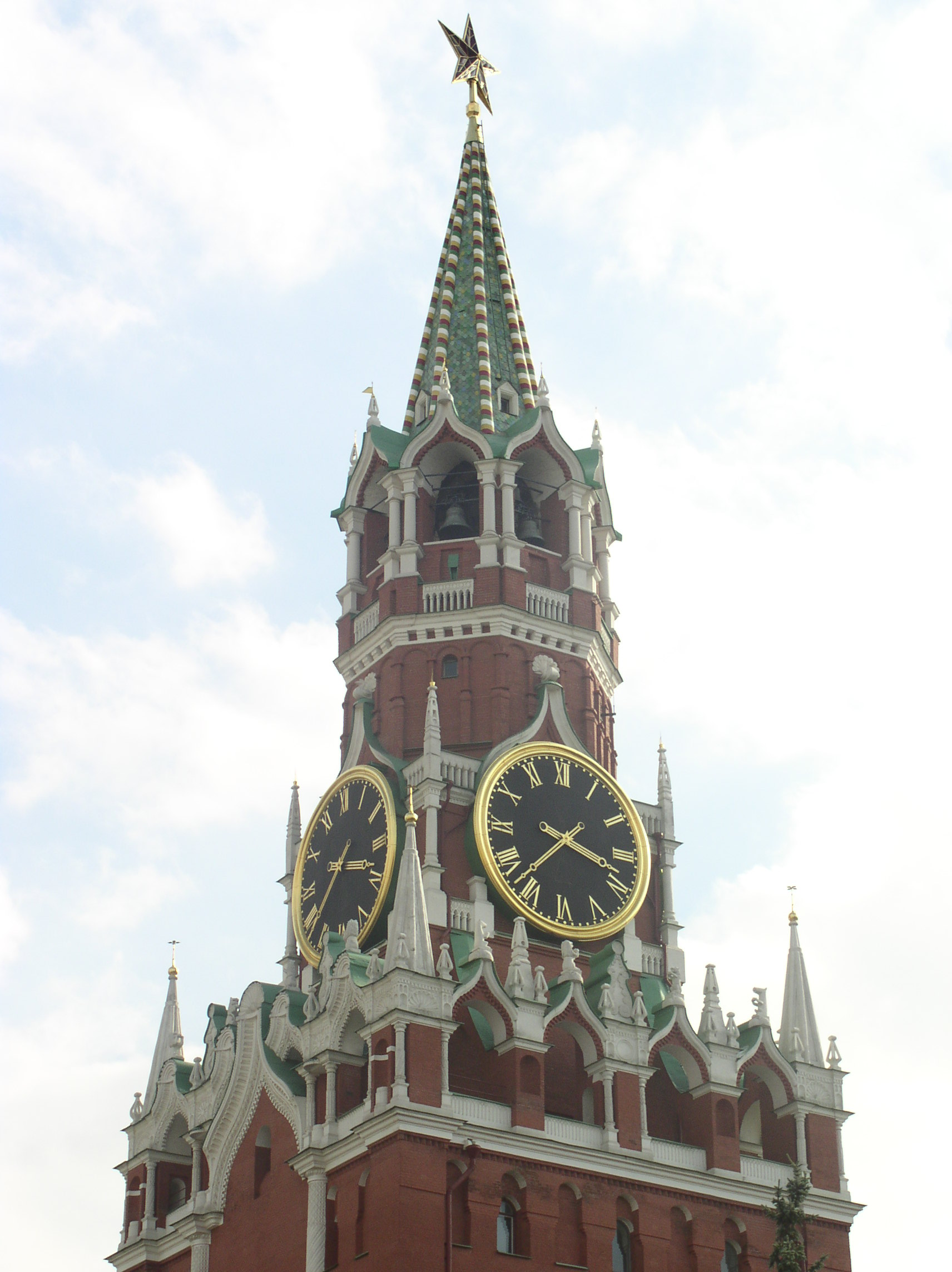
The tented roof of the Spassky Tower

Christopher Galloway (Note: Also spelled Halloway or Holloway.) (fl. 1621–1645) was a Scottish engineer and architect active in Russia during the reign of Tsar Mikhail. He is best known for constructing the clocks at the tented roof of the Spassky Tower in the Moscow Kremlin, and the water engine in the Vodovzvodnaya Tower.

== Life ==
Nothing is known about his early biography before his arrival in Moscow in 1621 (or 1620 in different accounts), and after 1645. Historian Ivan Zabelin believes that Galloway was mentioned in a chronicle as Christophor Christophorov; however, I. L. Buseva-Davydova thinks that those are two different persons.

He travelled to Moscow at the request of King James VI, who at that time arranged sale and diplomatic relations with the Tsar. It was agreed that Galloway receive 60 rubles per year, 20 copecks provision each day, and a carriage of firewood each week. In 1640 he now received 75 rubles in a year and doubled provision. Moreover, as a courtier he received "all kind of food and drink" by the Tsar's palace. Others say that for food he received 6 altyns and 5 dengas in 1641 (20 and a half of kopecks), and received the double from 1645 on.

According to chronicles, Galloway repaired the clocks of the Tsesarskaya Tower in 1628, and also "small clocks at the gates [or: small pocket watches, as per Zabelin; meaning is unclear]".

When Mikhail Fyodorovich wished to see clocks on the Spassky Tower with more difficult mechanics as before, Galloway agreed and, because of the clocks' placement, also recommended to overbuild a high tower with a thatched roof over the gates, which was done from 1624 to 1625. When the work was finished and the bells controlled the clocks' time, Galloway received on 29 January 1626 from the tsar and his father, Patriarch Philaret Nikitich, salary of one silver cube, 10 arshin scarlet satin, 10 arshin azure damask, 5 arshin amber-coloured taffeta, 4 arshin raspberry-coloured stuff, forty sables for 41 rubles, forty martens for 12 rubles; altogether cost about 100 rubles. "The Tsar presented him all this for constructing the tower and clocks over the Frolovsky gates in the Kremlin". In May that same year a heavy fire destroyed the clocks; Galloway restarted the work and finished in 1628; on 16 August 1628 he received almost the same presents as before.

The arrangement of the clocks was not typical: the dial spun, and not the hands. The English physician Samuel Collins, when visiting Moscow, discovered that, and wrote to his friend Robert Boyle:

On our clocks the hands move towards the numbers, in Russia it's the other way around – the numbers move towards the hand. Mr. Galloway – a very talented person – invented a dial of this type. He explains it like that: 'As the Russians are different than other people, the things made should be that way accordingly'

In 1633, Galloway constructed a machine to lift water from the Moskva into the Sviblova (Vodovzvodnaya) Tower.

Galloway also built the complex of the Printing House (Pechatnyy Dom). According to I. L. Buseva-Davydova, the plan of the Terem Palace (1636–1637) may have belonged to Galloway.

== Sources ==
- Colvin, Howard. A Biographical Dictionary of British architects, 1600–1840. 2008. ISBN 978-0-300-12508-5. p. 402.
- Howard, Jeremy. The Scottish Kremlin Builder: Christopher Galloway - Clockmaker, Architect and Engineer to Tsar Mikhail, the first Romanov. Manifesto, 1997. ISBN 978-0953209705
- Howard, Jeremy (2004). "Galloway, Christopher". Oxford Dictionary of National Biography. doi:10.1093/ref:odnb/61589.
- Shvidkovsky, Dmitrii (2007). Russian Architecture and the West. London: Yale University Press. pp. 151–156. ISBN 978-0-300-10912-2.
