= The Bell Tower =

Opera by Ernst Krenek

- Chamber opera by Ernst Krenek
- Librettist: Krenek
- Language: English
- Based on: short story by Herman Melville
- Premiere: March 17, 1957; University of Illinois

The Bell Tower is a chamber opera in one act by Ernst Krenek, his Op. 153. The English libretto by the composer was inspired by the short story by Herman Melville (collected in The Piazza Tales), the events only mysteriously hinted at in the story becoming a point of departure for the explicit dramatic action of Krenek's piece. It was commissioned by the Fromm Foundation and written in 1955–56, receiving its premiere on 17 March 1957 at the University of Illinois (recorded on CRS 5).

== Roles ==
Role	Voice type	Premiere Cast, (Conductor:John Garvey)
Bannadonna, bell-caster and architect	baritone	Manfred Capell
Giovanni, foreman	bass	William Olson
Una, Bannadonna's daughter	soprano	Donna Sue Burton
Two Senators	Baritone & Tenor	Dan MacDonald, Donald Paschke
Two workers	Tenor & Baritone	Edward Levy, Bruce Govich
Statue		John Wilson
Chorus of citizens, workers	SATB	

Orchestra: 1.1.1.0-0.1.1.0-perc-pft-str (offstage: 2tpt, trb, sn-dr.)
