= Spasskaya Tower =

Coordinates: 55.752544°N 37.621425°E

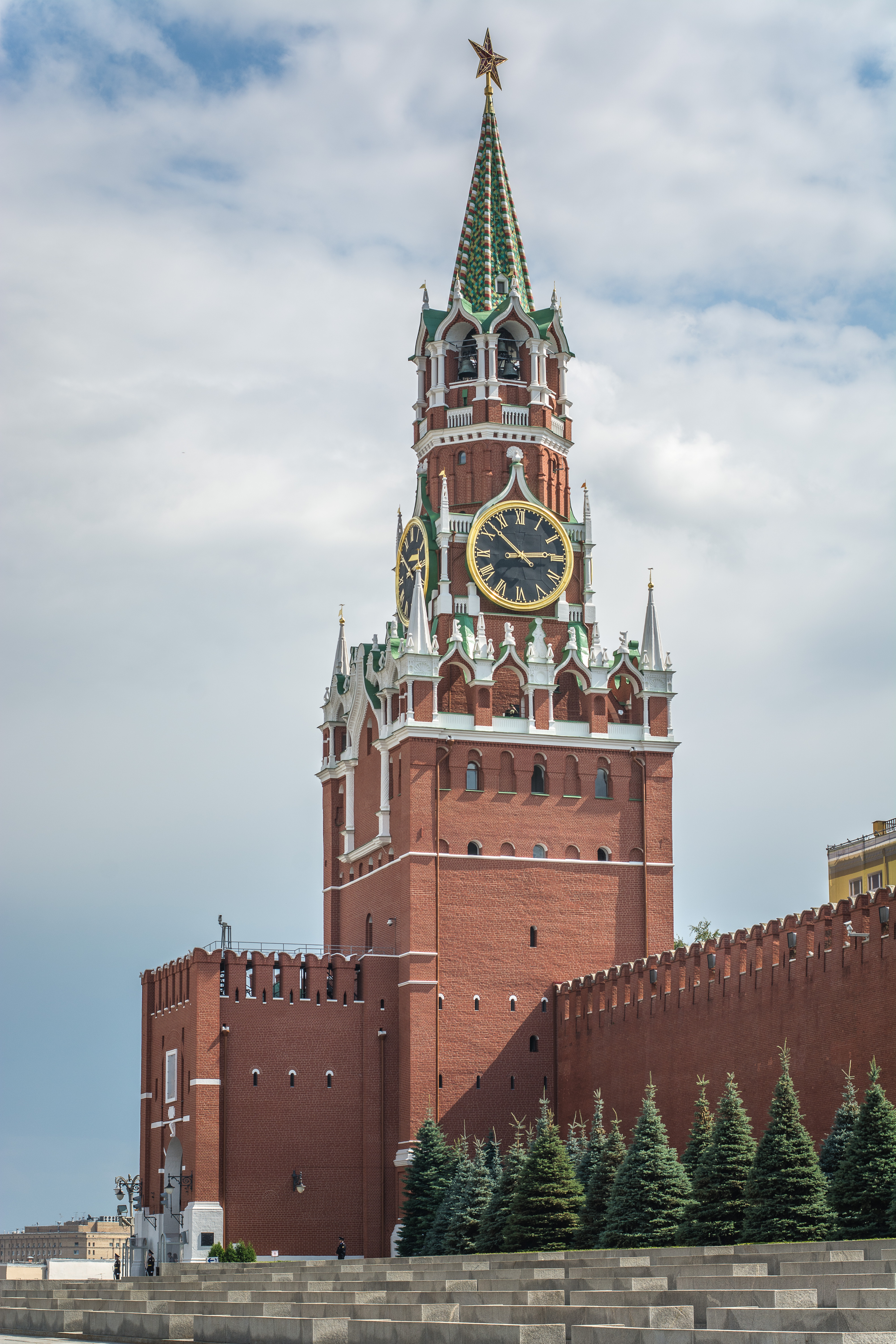
- The Spasskaya Tower
- Interactive map of the Spasskaya Tower area

General information
- Location: Moscow, Russia
- Opened: 1491; 535 years ago

Height
- Height: 71 metres (233 ft)

Design and construction
- Architect: Pietro Antonio Solari

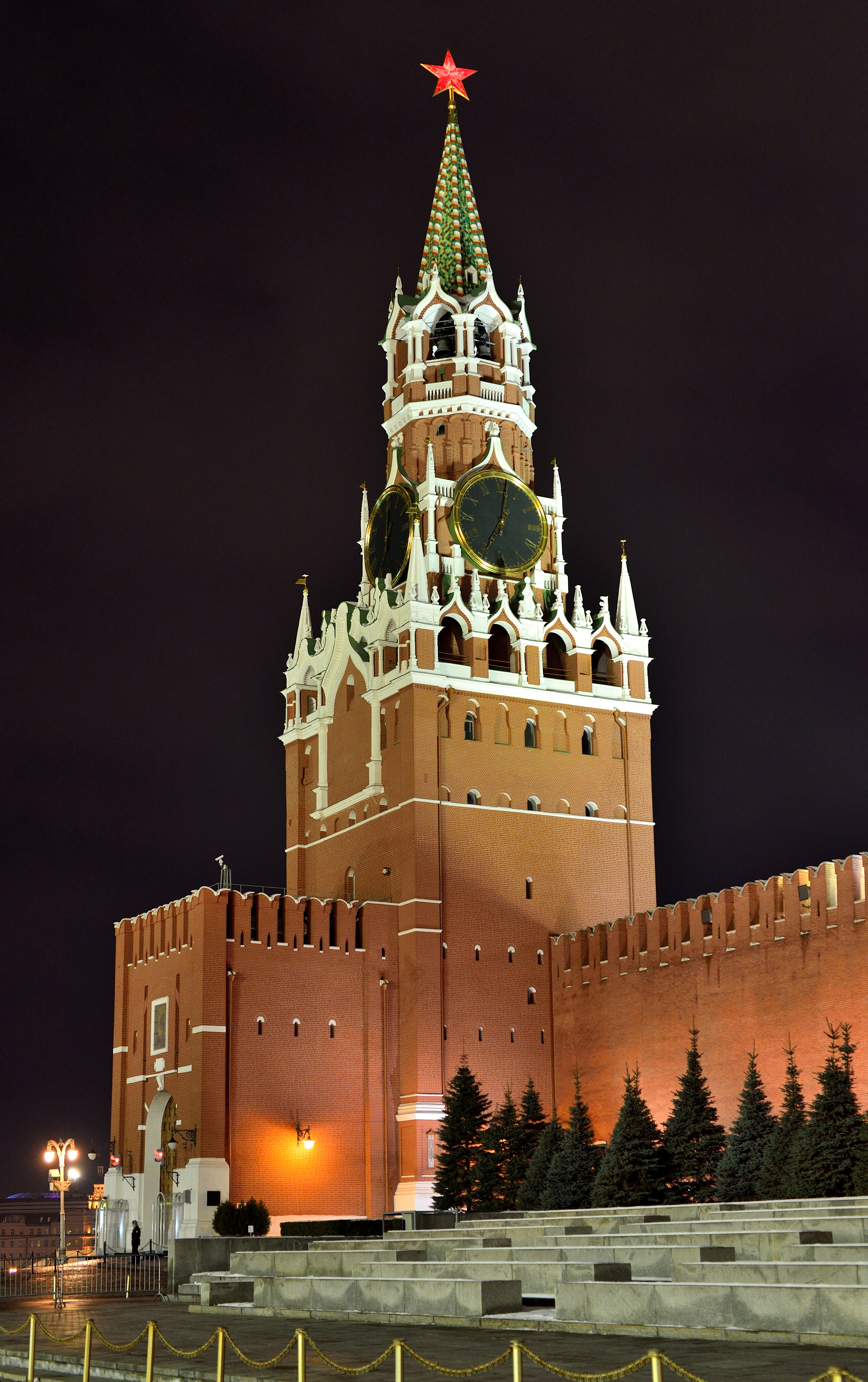
Spasskaya tower at night, December 2015

The Spasskaya Tower (Russian: Спасская башня, romanized: Spasskaya bashnya), also translated as the Saviour Tower, is the main tower on the eastern wall of the Moscow Kremlin which overlooks Red Square.

== History ==
=== Early history ===
The construction of the Spasskaya Tower was commissioned by Grand Prince Ivan III the Great. It was built in 1491 by the Italian architect Pietro Antonio Solari. Initially, it was named the Frolovskaya Tower after the Church of Frol and Lavr in the Kremlin, which is no longer there. The tower's modern name comes from the icon of Spas Nerukotvorny (Russian: Спас Нерукотворный), translated as the "Saviour Not Made by Hands", which was placed above the gates on the inside wall in 1658. It was later removed in 1917. The tower is also named for the wall-painted icon of Spas Smolensky (Russian: Спас Смоленский), translated as the "Smolensk Saviour", which was created in the 16th century on the outside wall of the tower, plastered over in 1937, but reopened and restored in 2010.

In 1508, a wooden drawbridge connected the tower to a guardhouse after the Aleviz Ditch and a moat was built, later replaced with an arched stone bridge. The Spasskaya Tower was the first tower of the many Moscow Kremlin towers to be crowned with the hipped roof in 1624–1625 by architects Bazhen Ogurtsov and Christopher Galloway. According to a number of historical accounts, the clock on the Spasskaya Tower appeared between 1491 and 1585. It is usually referred to as the Kremlin chimes (Кремлёвские куранты) and officially designates Moscow Time. The clock face has a diameter of 6 metres (20 ft). The gate of Spasskaya Tower was used to greet foreign dignitaries, and was also used during formal ceremonies or processions held on Red Square.

As part of Peter the Great's efforts on improving fortifications, a redan was built in front of the bastion. The inside bank of the moat was faced with stone. The guardhouse remained in place until it was removed in the 20th century.

=== Recent history ===
After the establishment of the Soviet Union, in 1936, Joseph Stalin replaced the two-headed eagle on top of the Spasskaya Tower with a red star because he wanted to remove all evidence of the former tsarist period. The height of the tower with the star is 71 meters. The tradition of dismounting the horse and removing the cap ended during the Soviet period. Cars approached the gate head on from the Lobnoye Mesto and the road beside the GUM department store. All other traffic was routed through the Borovitsky Gate.

Various cathedrals were demolished throughout the years to make room for other government buildings. It was not until 1955 during the rule of Nikita Khrushchev that the Kremlin was reopened to foreign visitors; the Kremlin was turned into a museum in 1961 and added to the World Heritage List in 1990. The daughter of Soviet cosmonaut Yuri Gagarin is the current director of the Kremlin Museums, Elena Gagarina. There are many cathedrals inside the Kremlin walls, and many of them hold church services, however irregularly because the cathedrals are still operated as museums.

The Spasskaya Gate posed an issue following in the 1990s, as the passage of vehicles disrupted the flow of pedestrians to GUM and other shopping centers. In 1999, the decision was made to finally close the gate to all traffic. The signal lights and guard platforms still remain. The gate is used occasionally when repairs must be made to the Borovissky Gate. However, in that case, all traffic is routed from Vasilyevsky Spusk. Nowadays, the gate opens to receive the presidential motorcades on inauguration day, for the World War II Victory Day parades, and to receive the New Year's tree.

In August 2014, Russian president Vladimir Putin suggested an idea for restoring Ascension Convent and Chudov Monastery, which were demolished by the Soviet regime in the 1930s. However, due to archaeological work which began in December 2015 and the lack of UNESCO's approval of the restoration, the restoration of Ascension Convent is currently unplanned. During archaeological work, experts have managed to find a foundation of the Chudov Monastery and Ascension Convent.

The Spasskaya Tower is also the honorific for the International Military Music Festival "Spasskaya Tower", which is based within the grounds of Red Square.

In August 2010, the icon of the Smolensk Saviour was uncovered and restored above the gate. This begins the tradition of the parade inspector to remove his headgear and cross himself before the inspection of troops during all Moscow Victory Day Parades.

Beginning in 2016, there has been an hourly guard mounting ceremony by the Kremlin Regiment within the area of the gate.

== Inscription ==
On top of the gates of Spasskaya Tower, there appears the following inscription (it is inscribed in Latin):

In Latin: IOANNES VASILII DEI GRATIA MAGNUS DUX VOLODIMERIÆ, MOSCOVIÆ, NOVOGARDIÆ, TFERIÆ, PLESCOVIÆ, VETICIÆ, ONGARIÆ, PERMIÆ, BUOLGARIÆ ET ALIAS TOTIUSQUE RAXIE DOMINUS, ANNO 30 IMPERII SUI HAS TURRES CONDERE FECIT ET STATUIT PETRUS ANTONIUS SOLARIUS MEDIOLANENSIS ANNO NATIVIT ATIS DOMINI 1491 KALENDIS MARTIIS IUSSIT PONERE.

In English: Ioann Vasiliyevich, by God's grace, Great Prince of Vladimir, Moscow, Novgorod, Tver, Pskov, Vyatka, Ugorsk, Perm, Bulgaria and others, and Ruler of all Russia, ordered this tower to be built in Year 30 of his reign, and Pietro Antoni Solari the Milanese made it in the Year 1491 since the Incarnation of Our Lord.

== Gallery ==
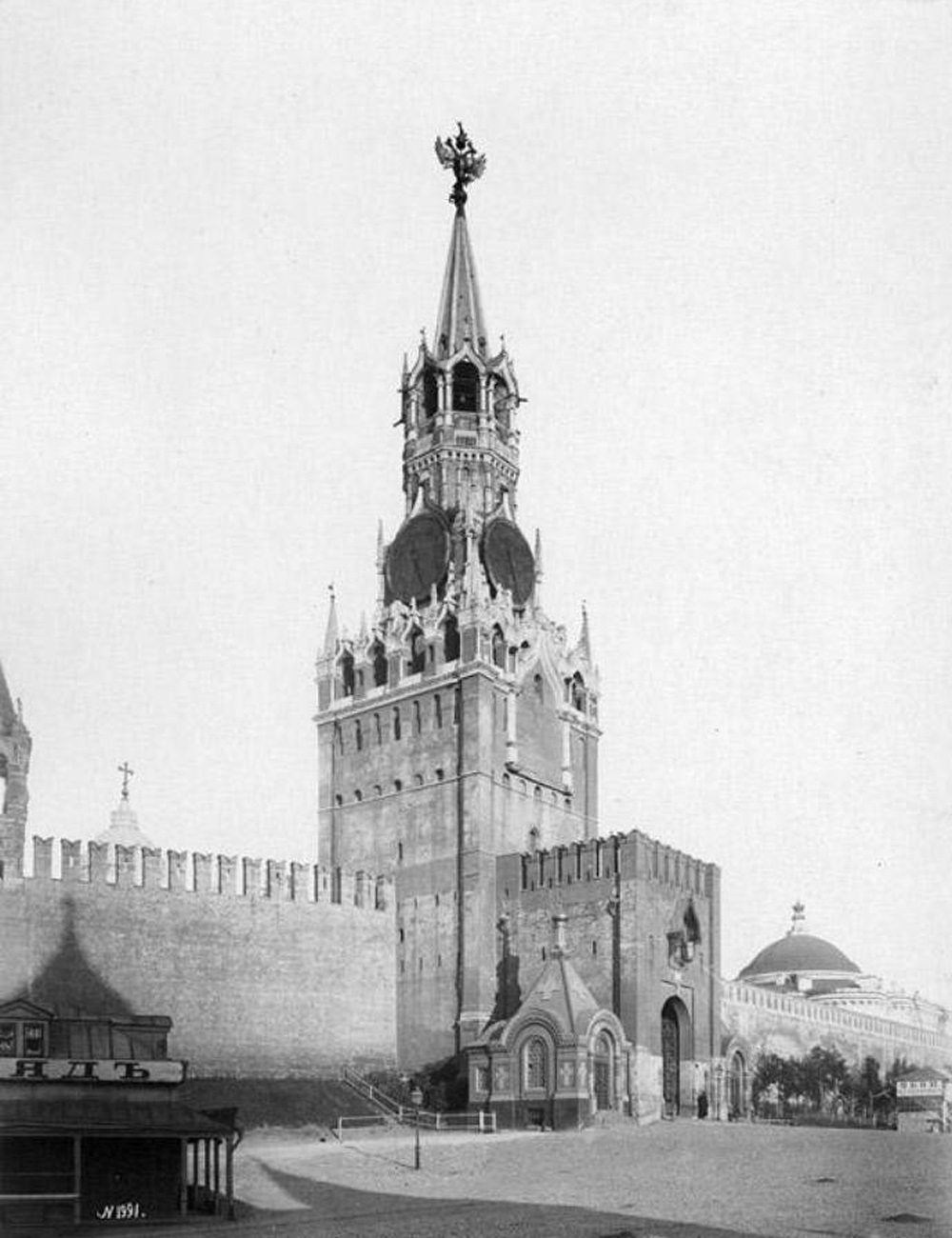
Spasskaya Tower in 1880

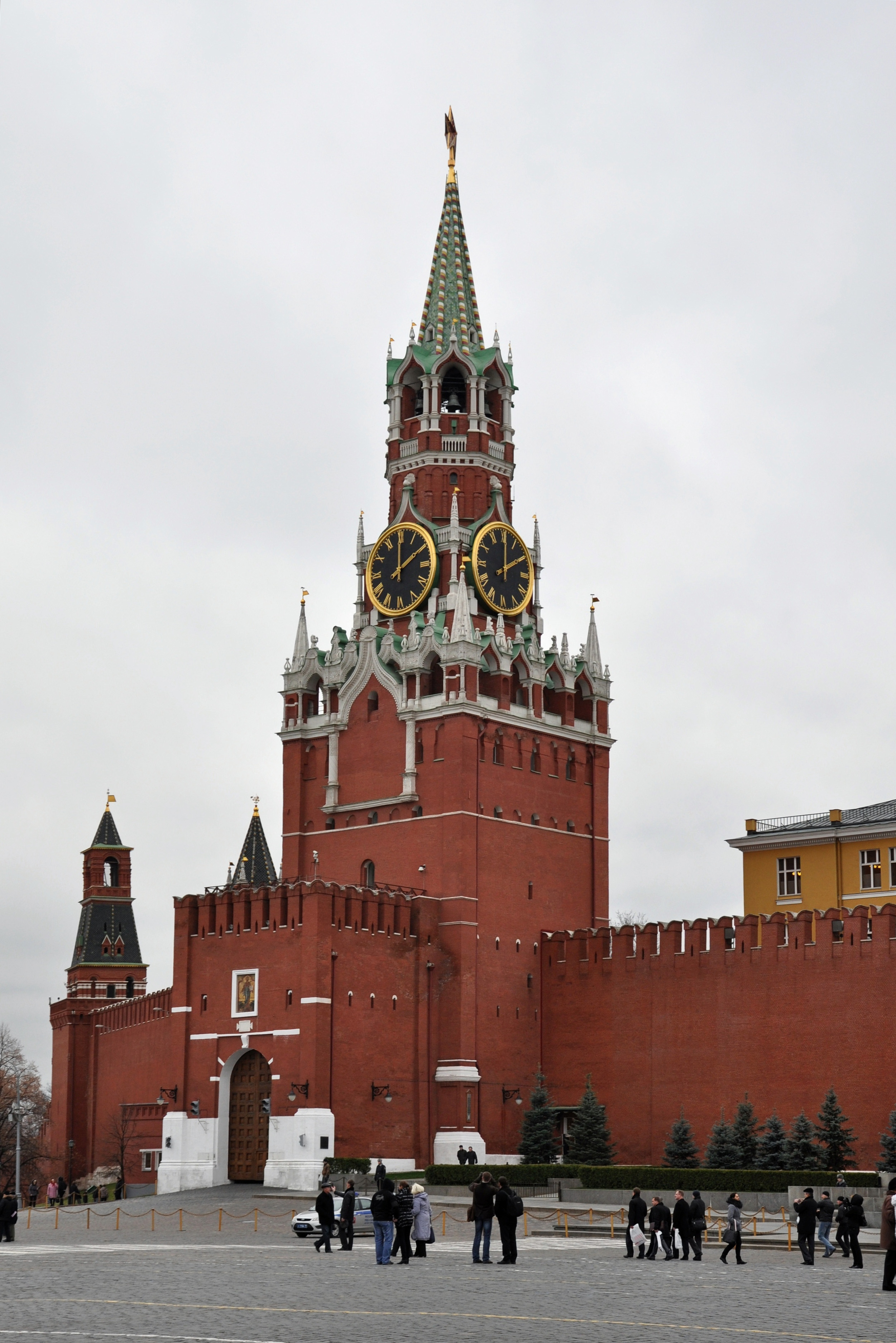
Spasskaya Tower

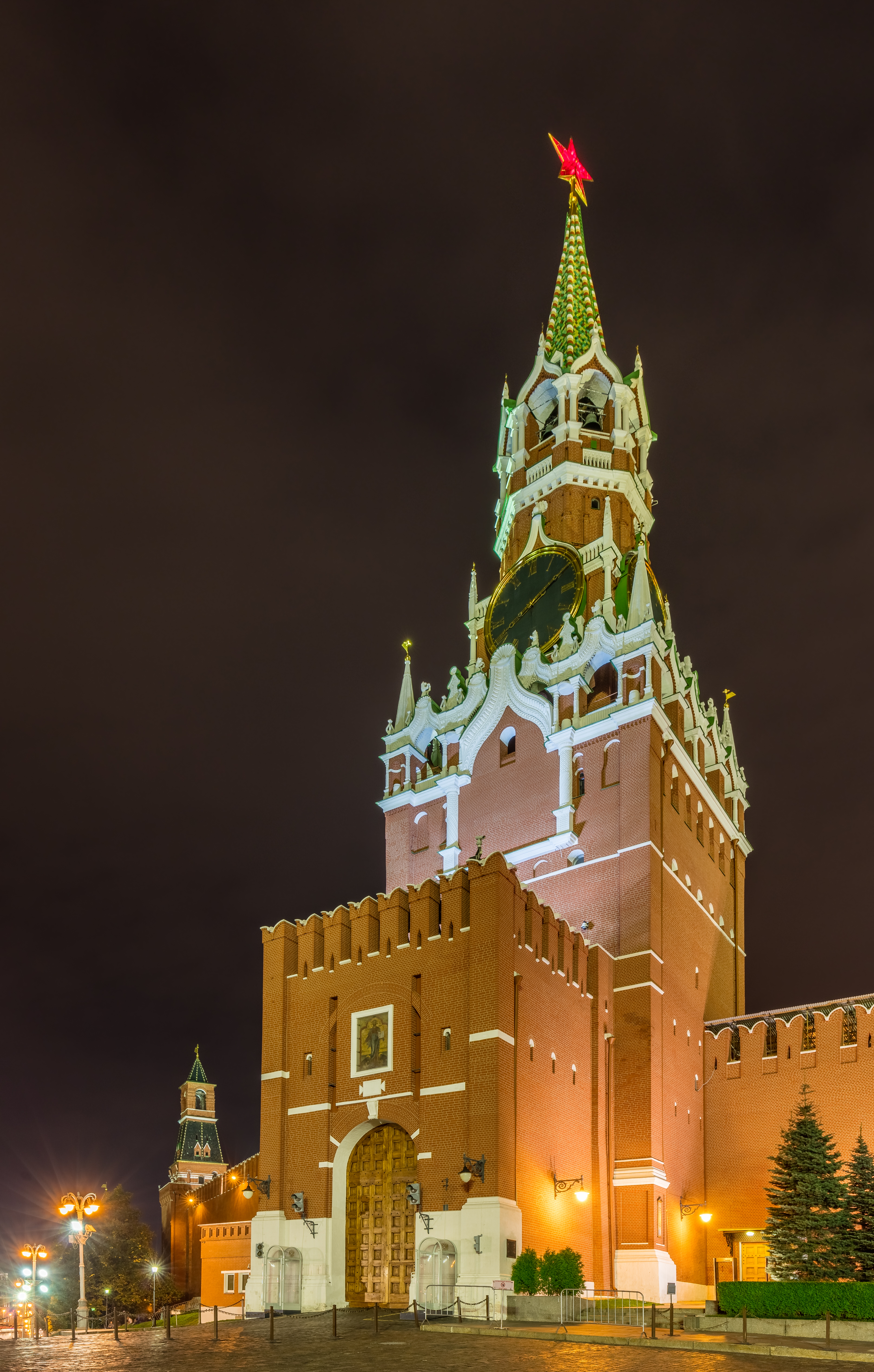
Spasskaya Tower at night

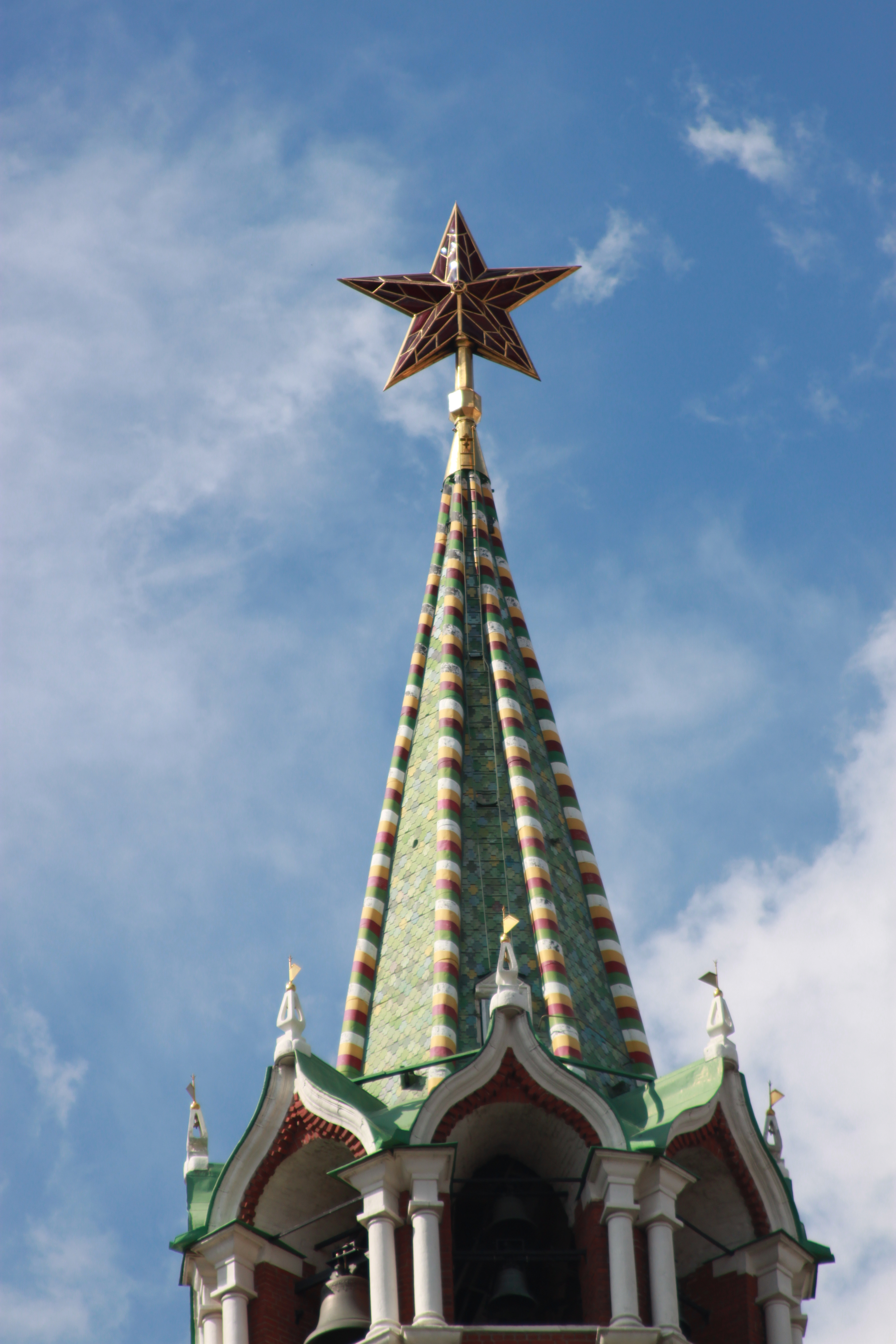
A Kremlin star (Spasskaya tower)

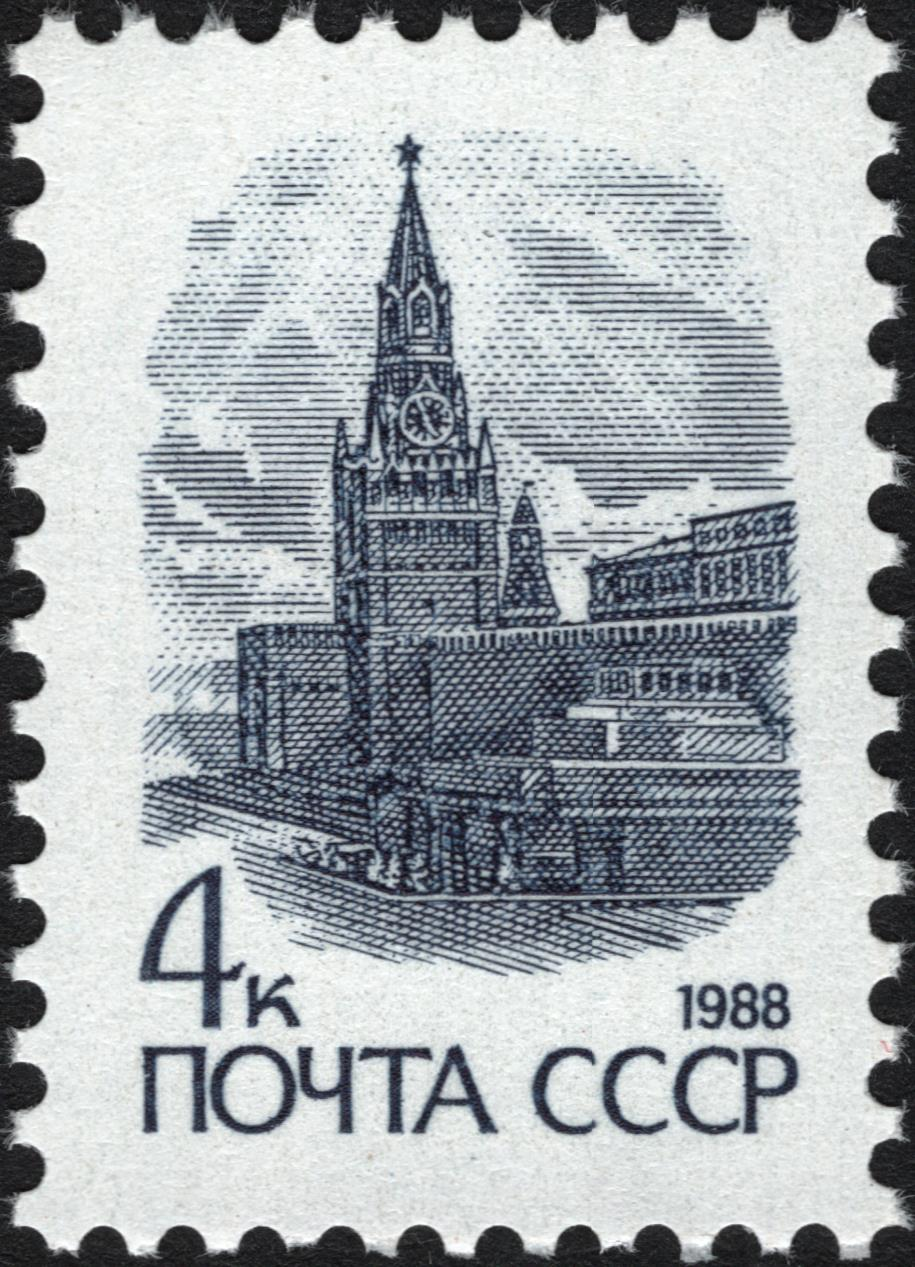
A Soviet stamp featuring the tower.

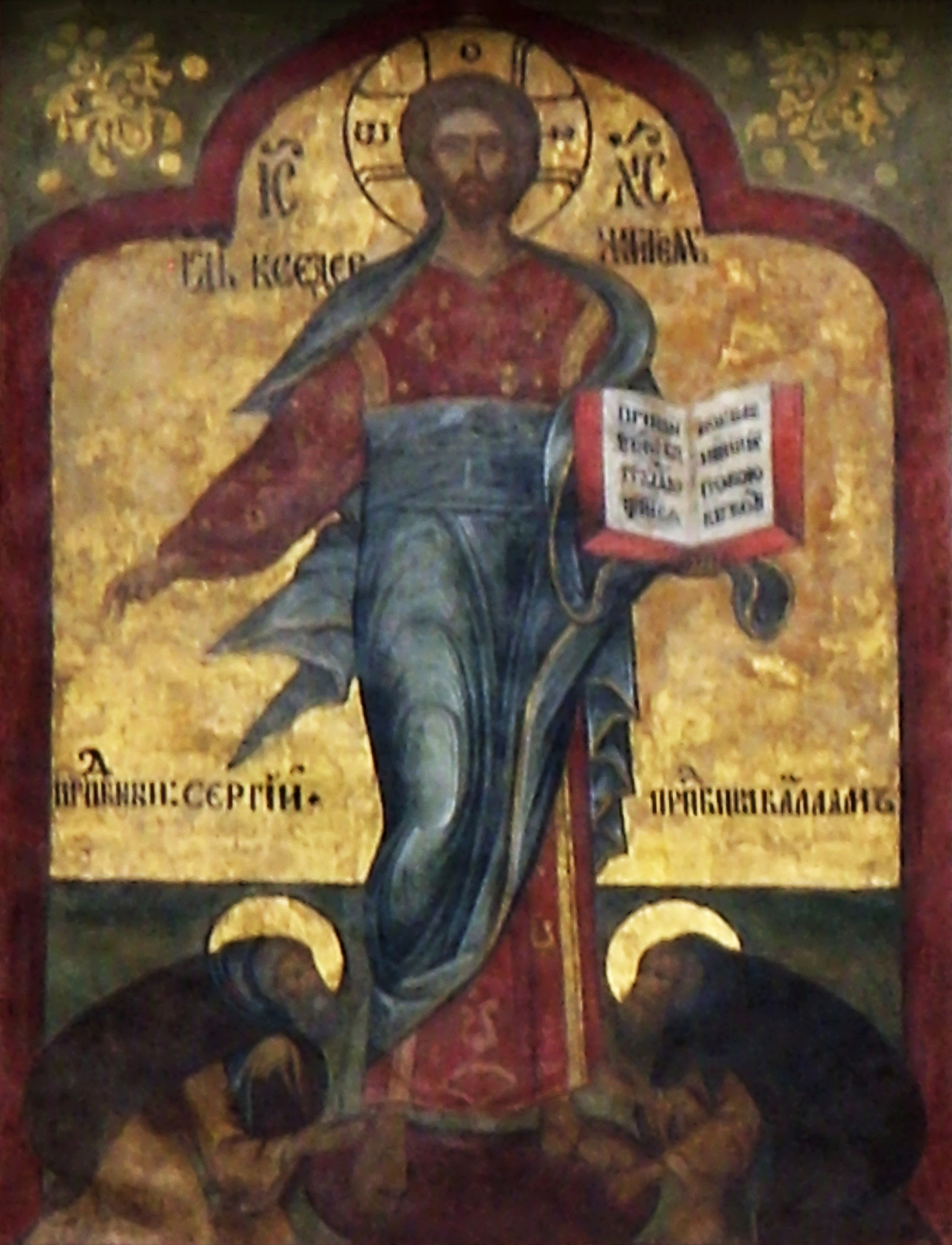
Spas Smolensky

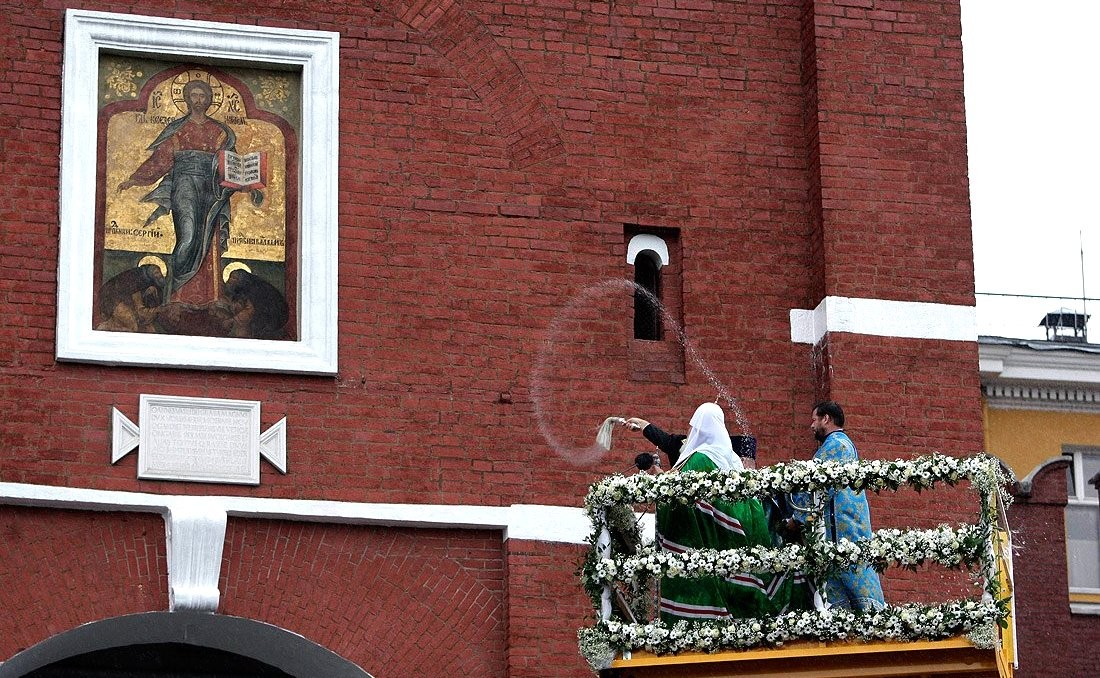
Sanctification ceremony of the icon. August, 2010.

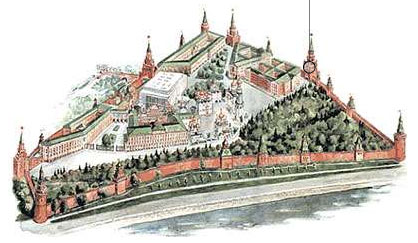
Location of the tower in the Kremlin marked with a circle.

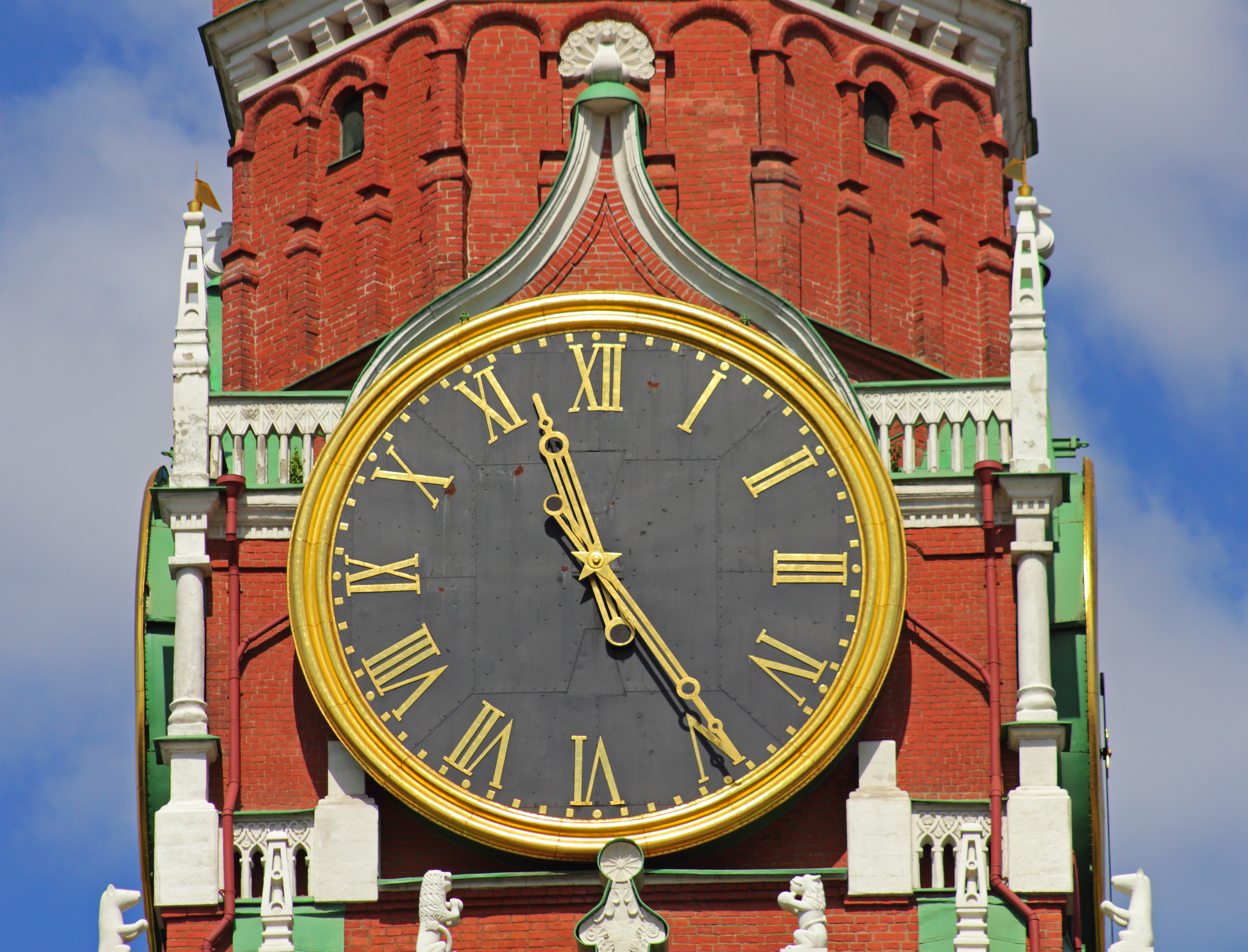
Kremlin clock

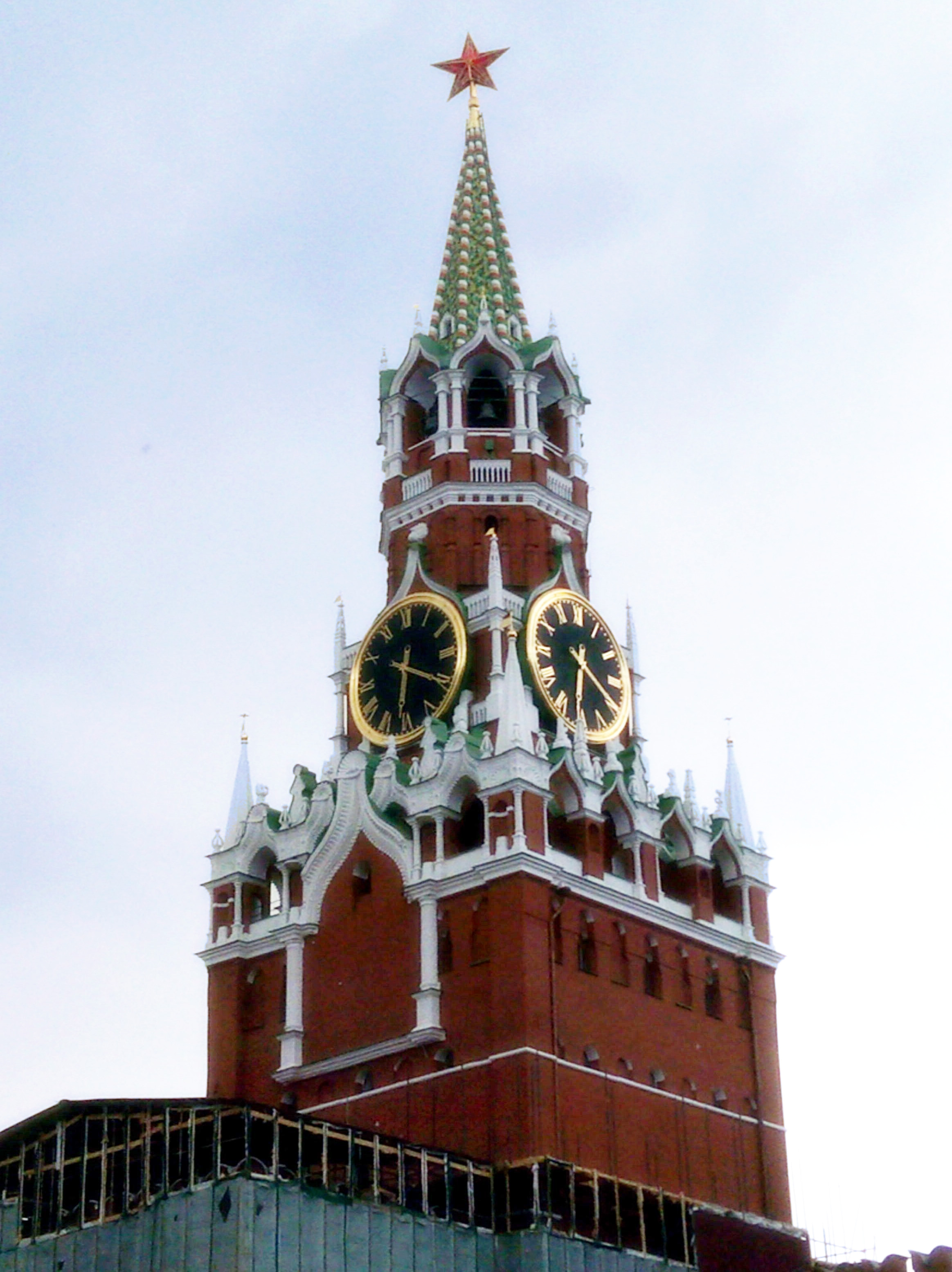
Spasskya Tower after restoration (2015)

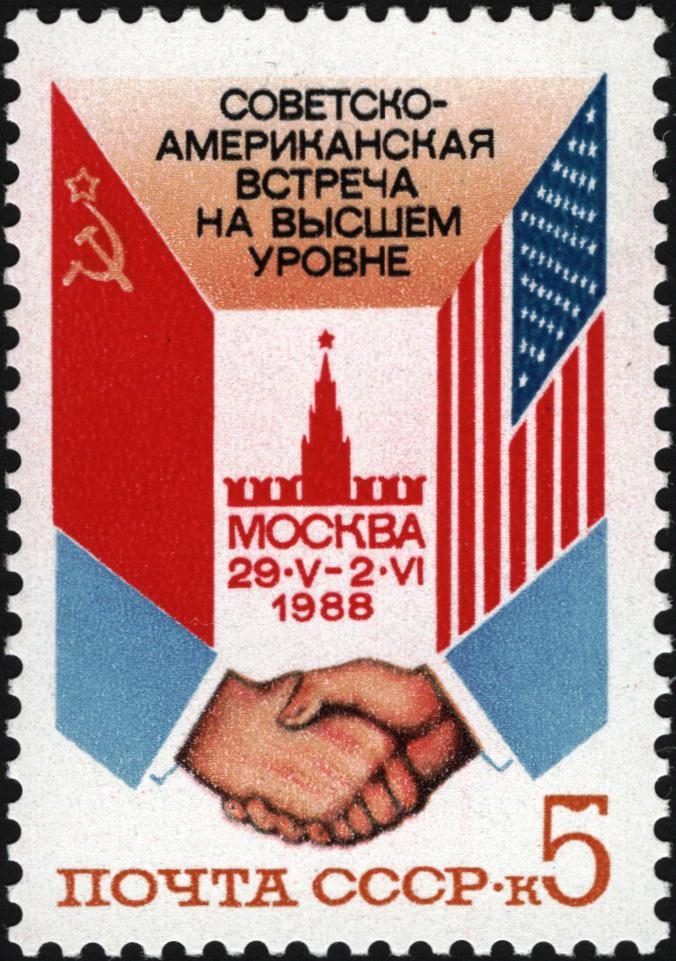
Moscow Summit (1988) postage stamps, Spasskaya Tower and handshake

== Sources ==
- Shvidkovsky, Dmitrii (2007). Russian Architecture and the West. London: Yale University Press. pp. 151–156. ISBN 978-0-300-10912-2.
