= Bats in the belfry =

Bats in the belfry may refer to:

== Books ==
- Bats in the Belfry, 1937 novel by E. C. R. Lorac

== Film ==
- Bats in the Belfry (1942 film), a one-shot Metro-Goldwyn-Mayer animated short
- Bats in the Belfry (1960 film), a Woody Woodpecker film

== Music ==
- "Bats in the Belfry", a song by Annihilator from their 1993 album Set the World on Fire
- "Bats in the Belfry", a song by Ekoostik Hookah from their 1994 album Dubbahbuddah
- "Bats in the Belfry", a song by Dispatch from their 1997 album Bang Bang
- "Bats in the Belfry", a song by Overkill from their 2005 album ReliXIV
- "Bats in the Belfry", a song by Nox Arcana from their 2005 album Transylvania
- "Bats in the Belfry", a song by Zombie Ghost Train from their 2007 album Dealing the Death Card
- "Bats in the Belfry", a song by Qveen Herby from her 2021 album Halloqveen

== Television ==
- "Bats in the Belfry", an episode of the animated TV series The Oddball Couple
- "Bats in the Belfry", an episode of the TV sitcom Terry and June
- "Bats in the Belfry", an episode of the animated TV series Space Goofs
- "Bats in the Belfry", an episode of the animated TV series Arthur
- "Bat in the Belfry", an episode of the animated TV series Teenage Mutant Ninja Turtles (2012 TV series)
- "The Bat In the Belfry", an episode of the animated TV series The Batman (TV series 2004-2008)

== Other uses ==
- Bats in the Belfry, a 1937 play by Diana Morgan
- Bats in the Belfry, an Apple II game, 1983
- Bats-in-the-belfry, a common name for the bellflower Campanula trachelium

== See also ==
- Bat
- Belfry (architecture)
