= Bell Tower (band) =

Canadian band

- Origin: Calgary, Alberta, Canada
- Genres: Alternative rock
- Years active: 2009–2017
- Labels: Studio014 Entertainment
- Members: Tom Englund; Ross Watson; Mike Hudec; Jordan Ackerman
- Website: Official Website

Bell Tower was a four-piece alternative rock/garage rock band from Calgary, Alberta, active from 2009 to 2017.

== Biography ==
The band started in early 2009, with drummer Ross Watson and vocalist/guitarist Thomas Englund jamming in Englund's basement. They met bassist Jordan Ackerman and guitarist Mike Hudec, started playing together and, four months later, won the Battle Royale at MRU's Liberty Lounge. They were offered their first show at the legendary Marquee Room by Battle Royale judge and musician Lorrie Matheson. Also thanks to the connection with Matheson, Bell Tower made their first Sled Island appearance in 2009, and exposure through the Battle Royale competition earned them an opening slot with Hot Hot Heat in early 2010.

In 2011, Bell Tower released their first album, Redux. Their second album, Growing Growing, was released in 2013. In 2017, they released the EP Surprise We're Alive.

The band played their last concert in May 2017. In October 2018, they reunited for one night, playing a fundraising concert in Calgary.

== Discography ==
- Redux (released April 2, 2011)
- Growing Growing (released April 6, 2013)
- Surprise We're Alive EP (released May 27, 2017)
