= The Belfry (shopping centre) =

- Location: Redhill, Surrey, England
- Coordinates: 51.24°N 0.17°W
- Opened: 1991; 35 years ago
- Num. of stores: 64
- Num. of anchor tenants: 4
- Floor area: 248,730 square feet (23,108 m^{2})
- Floors: 2
- Parking: 776 space car park
- Website: www.belfrywebsite.co.uk

The Belfry is a shopping centre located in Redhill, Surrey, England.

== History ==
The Belfry Shopping Centre first opened on 15 October 1991, in the centre of Redhill, having been constructed on the site of an old car park. It dramatically altered the already changing face of Redhill, bringing it well into the modern age and has created many jobs with the 43 shops it contains. It spreads over 248,000 square feet (23,000 m^{2}), and has two shopping levels - the bottom being High Street Mall, and the upper level Station Road Mall. They are named after the roads the respective levels exit onto.

When it was first opened it was notable for bringing many famous high street names to Redhill for the first time, such as Marks & Spencer, Our Price and WH Smiths. The Redhill branch of Boots built an extension to their store so they could connect an entrance to the centre.

== Awards ==
In February 2006, the Belfry announced that it had won the 'Purple Apple' National Retail award. It beat competition from the country's larger and more popular centres in the Best Single Event category, for its 'Modelsearch' competition, which not only looks to find new modelling talent of all shapes and sizes, both male and female, while increasing traffic to the mall and allowing merchants to showcase their wares.

In 2004, the Belfry was the first shopping centre to be presented with the ISO 14001 certificate for environmental management. 48% of their waste is recycled, and a full 100% of their electricity comes from renewable sources.

They hold the ParkMark certificate, an award given for providing safe parking to their visitors.

Unofficially, it boasts the largest fake Christmas tree seen in any shopping centre across the nation, made especially for their big seasonal event, which includes a free Santa's grotto, which is hugely popular with the locals and in 2006 resulted in the opening hours having to be extended to accommodate everyone.

== 2007 refurbishment ==
On 17 January 2007 it was announced by Richard Cowlard, the centre manager, that the precinct would undergo a £1million, 9-month long renovation, to help bring it into the 21st century. Having bucked the trend over Christmas 2006 of falling high street figures, instead enjoying an increase, they deemed the refurbishment worth the investment and went ahead.

The work was all completed (by contractors Kier East) at night to avoid disruption to shoppers and loss of sales to the shops, and finished two months ahead of schedule in September 2007.

Specialists were drafted in to work on the 70-foot (21 m)-high glass atrium and a new smoke-detection system was installed, along with a new fire sprinkler system. New aesthetic features were installed and standing ones upgraded. The ceilings were replaced (although the roof still leaks) and the walls repainted in bright white. 800 high-spec lights were added to increase the vivid white effect of the shopping centre. Finnish lift company KONE were contracted to modernise the aging "scenic lifts" to better accommodate disabled people.

The centre became more environmentally friendly. Changes included energy-efficient lighting and removal of electric hand-driers from the toilets and the installation of hand-towel dispensers.

At the same time, one of the Belfry's biggest retailers, Marks & Spencer, which spreads over both the floors in the centre, underwent complete refurbishment, including the introduction of an instore cafe and bakery and the launch of their popular Per Una line.

== Later changes ==
In 2016, a reconfiguration programme began which saw several stores at The Belfry - including Mr Simms, O2, Robert Dyas and Toy Barnhaus (which has since been moved 2 times)- relocated in order to release a total of nine units across two levels, allowing this space to be converted into a single large store. In March 2017 it was confirmed that the newly configured store would be occupied by H&M from that spring.

== The Royal Earlswood Museum ==
Housed on Car Park level one, above Marks & Spencer, the Royal Earlswood Museum (since closed) is a small collection of some of the very few exhibits and items from the Royal Earlswood Asylum which was opened in 1847 and closed in 1997.

Earlswood is a small town just up the hill from Redhill, and is far closer to the actual hill considered to be the original red hill than the town Redhill itself.
