= Bell tower (Königsberg) =

- (Königsberg); Schlossturm (Königsberg); Колокольня (Кёнигсберг)
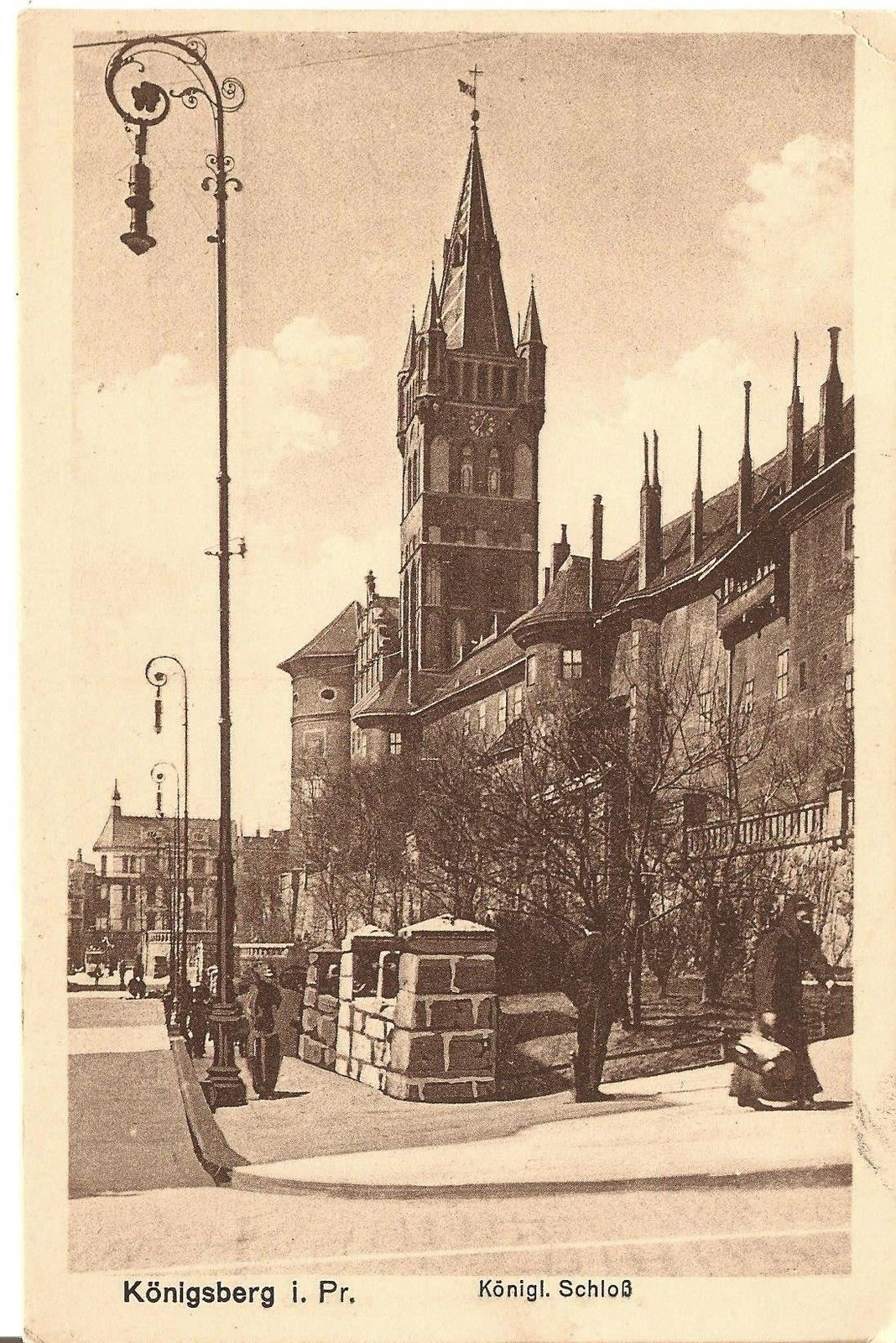
- Königsberg Castle with his big Bell tower before World War I

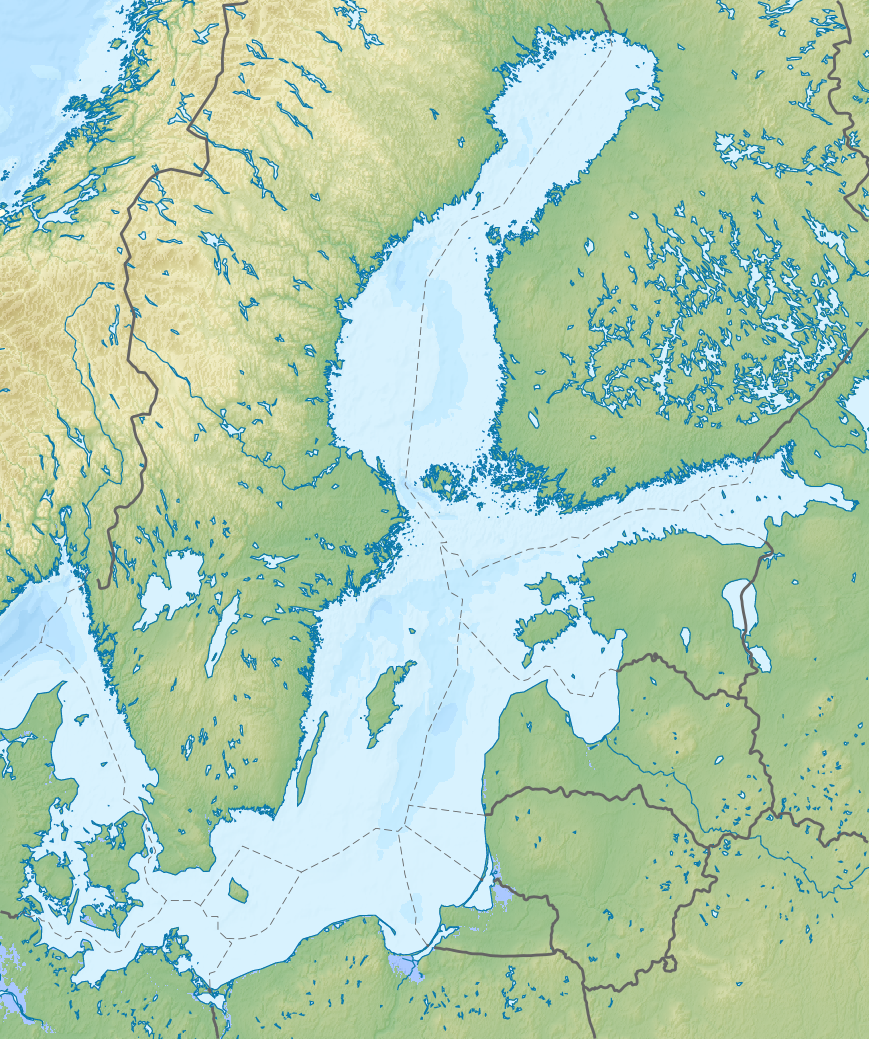
- Königsberg was a port city on the south eastern corner of the Baltic Sea. It is today known as Kaliningrad.
- 54°43′00″N 20°31′00″E
- Associated with: Sambians, Germans, Poles, Jews, Lithuanians

History
- Built: 1255
- Abandoned: 1945
- Event: World War II

Site notes
- Owner: Russia

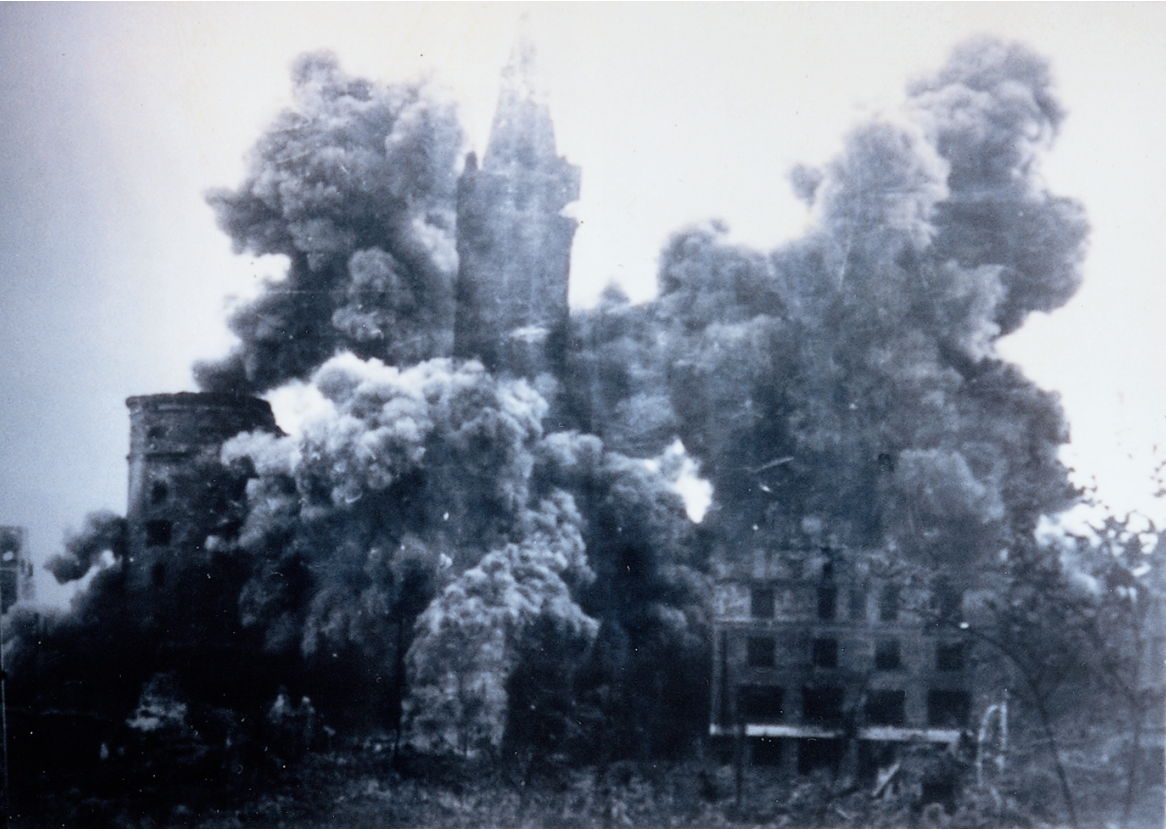
Demolition of the Bell tower with explosives, 1959

The Bell tower in Königsberg (built by the architect Stüler) was a bell tower of the Schlosskirche, Königsberg. After being largely destroyed in World War II by Allied Forces and then annexed by the Soviet Union thereafter, the city was renamed Kaliningrad, and few traces of the former Königsberg remain today. As part of Königsberg Castle, the bell tower of the Schlosskirche, Königsberg was devastated by the 1944 Bombing of Königsberg and 1945 Battle of Königsberg during World War II. The remnants were demolished in 1968, by which time the city was known as Kaliningrad.
