= Belfry =

Structure enclosing bells for ringing as part of building

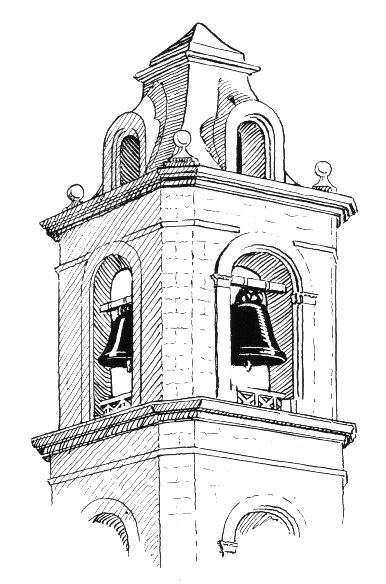
Belfry

The belfry (/ˈbɛlfri/ BEL-free) is a structure enclosing bells for ringing as part of a building, usually as part of a bell tower or steeple. It can also refer to the entire tower or building, particularly in continental Europe for such a tower attached to a city hall or other civic building.

A belfry encloses the bell chamber, the room in which the bells are housed; its walls are pierced by openings which allow the sound to escape. The openings may be left uncovered but are commonly filled with louvers to prevent rain and snow from entering and damaging the bells. There may be a separate room below the bell chamber to house the ringers.

== Etymology ==
The word belfry comes from the Old North French berfroi or berfrei, meaning 'movable wooden siege tower'. The Old French word itself is derived from Middle High German bercfrit, 'protecting shelter' (cf. the cognate bergfried), combining the Proto-Germanic bergen, 'to protect', or bergaz, 'mountain, high place', with frithu-, 'peace; personal security', to create berg-frithu, lit. 'high place of security' or 'that which watches over peace'. The etymology was forgotten with time, which led to a variety of folk etymologies and spellings, with the initial meaning being lost in the process, and sometime between the late 13th and the mid-15th century the new sense of "bell tower" was adopted in Anglo-Latin and Middle English. This new and current meaning came as a result of the common association with bell. Merriam-Webster explains the transformation by the fact that the initial word was later used for different types of towers and protective buildings, many containing bells. People associated the belfrey with bells, and by dissimilation or by association the word was successively spelled bellfrey, belfrey, and finally belfry. In larger towns, explains Kingsley Amis, watchmen placed in towers were also on the lookout for fires. Though flags were used by the watchmen for communication, these towers usually contained an alarm bell or bells built into a bell-cot, thus Middle English speakers thought berfrei had something to do with bells: they altered it to belfry, an interesting example of the process of folk etymology.

In Medieval Latin, the variants bertefredum, berfredum, and belfredum are known. Today's Dutch belfort combines the term bell with the term stronghold. It was a watchtower that a city was permitted to build in its defence, while the Dutch term klokkenstoel ('bell-chair') refers only to the construction of the hanging system, or the way the bell or bells are installed within the tower. The Old French berfroi or alike has become beffroi [fr] in modern French.

== Gallery ==
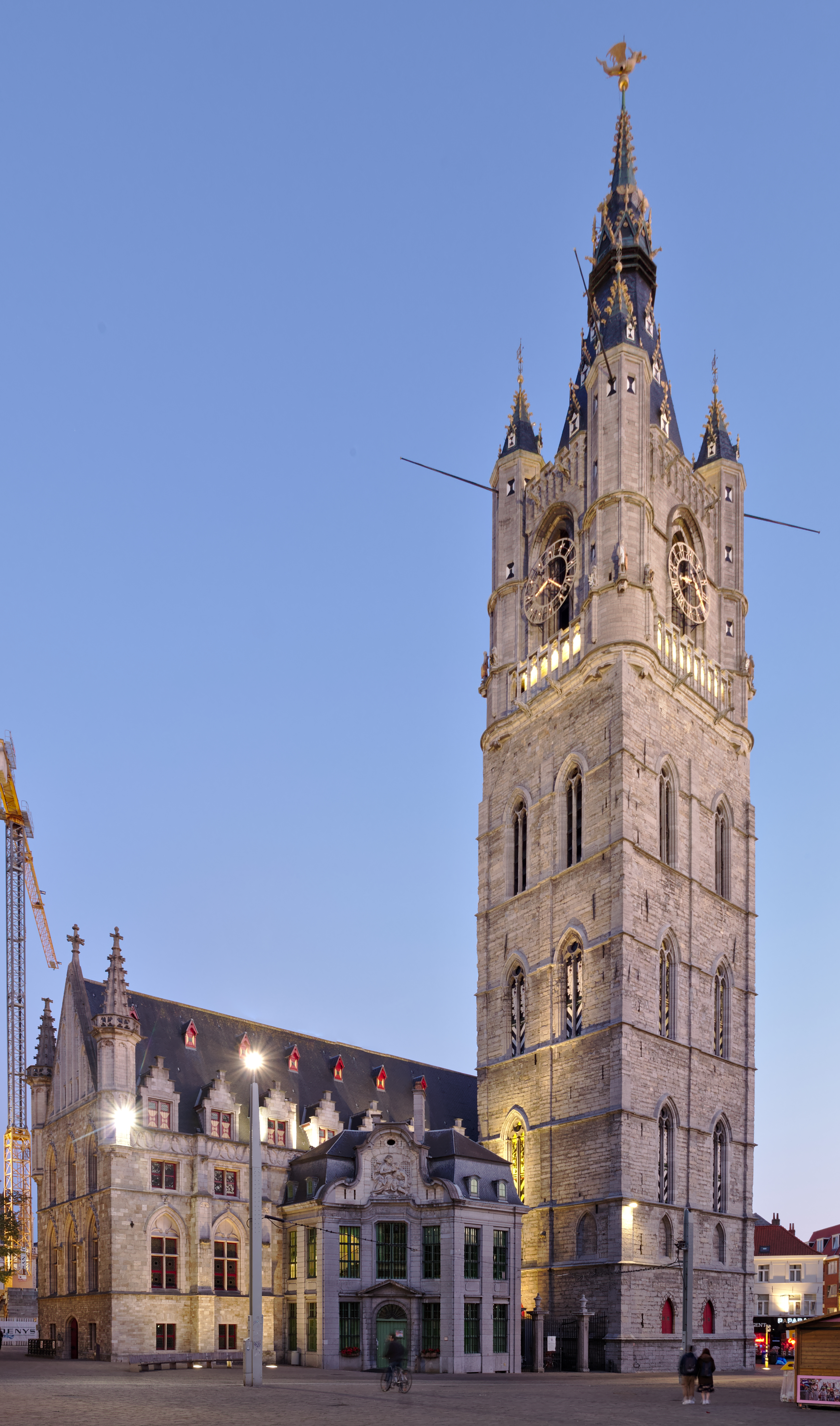
The Belfry (centre right) of Ghent, Belgium, beside the cloth hall and (smaller) Mammelokker

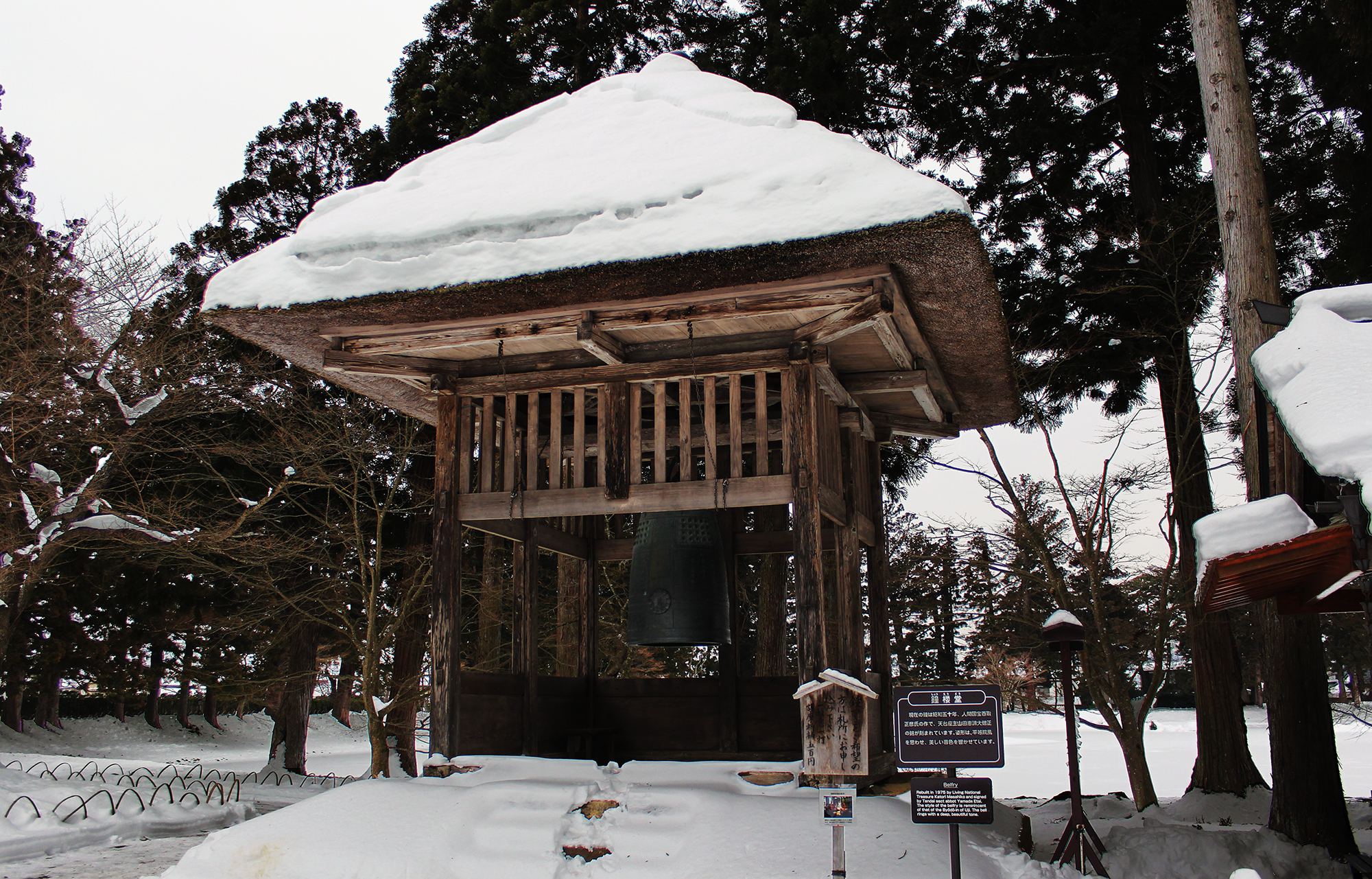
A belfry at Mōtsū-ji, a Tendai Buddhist temple in Hiraizumi, Japan

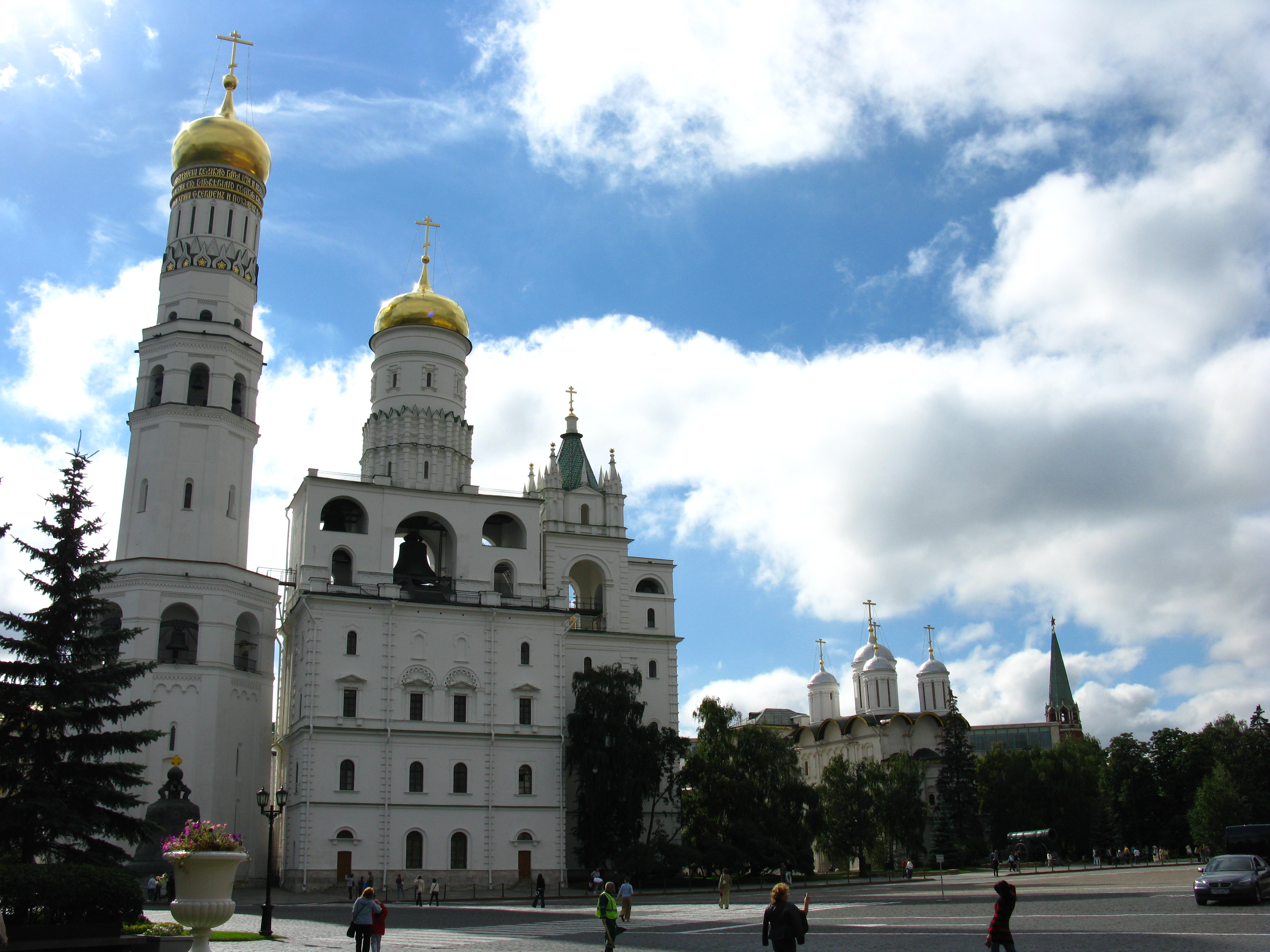
Dormition Cathedral belfry (centre left) next to the Ivan the Great Bell Tower, in the Kremlin, Moscow, Russia

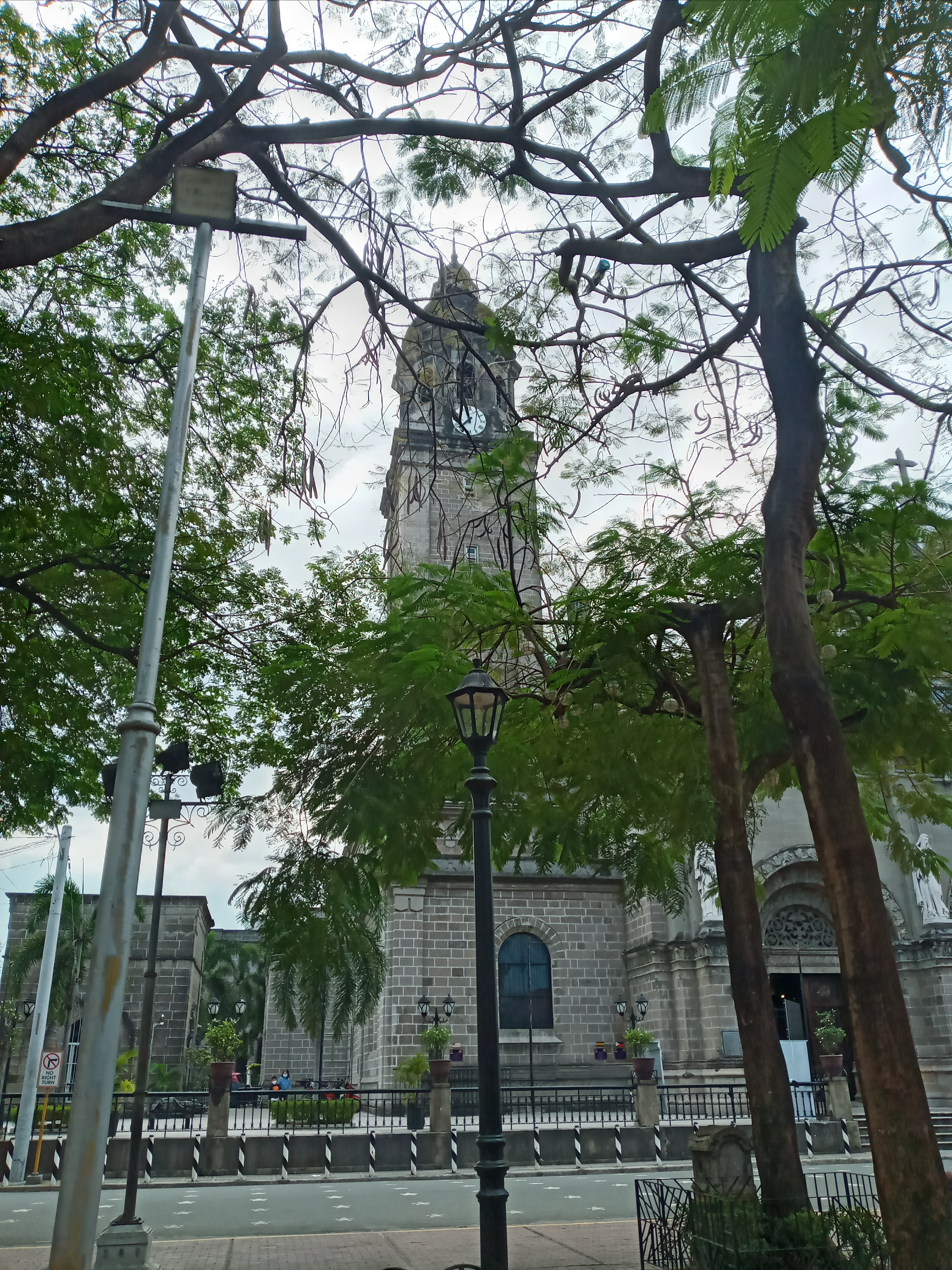
The Belfry of Manila Cathedral, Philippines

== See also ==
- Bats in the belfry (disambiguation)
- Belfries of Belgium and France, a UNESCO World Heritage Site in historic Flanders which is a collection of historical belfries.
- Shōrō
