= Troitskaya Tower =

Tower of the Kremlin in Moscow, Russia

- Троицкая башня
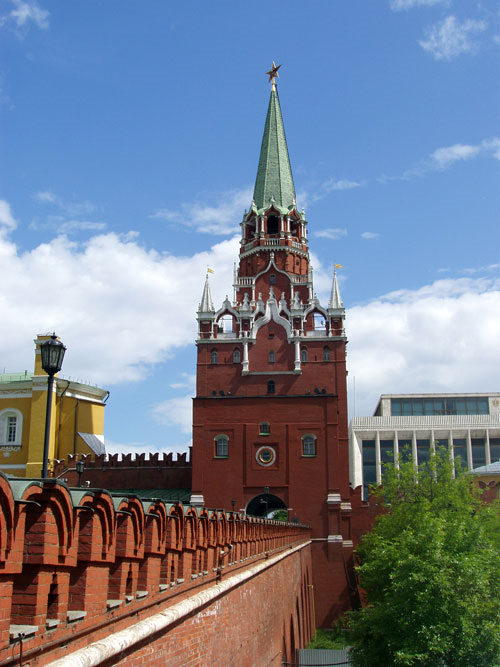
- Troitskaya Tower from the Troitsky Bridge

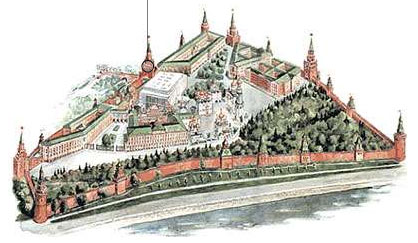
- Location in the Kremlin
- Former names: Rizopolozhenskaya, Bogoyavlenskaya Znamenskaya, and Karetnaya

General information
- Coordinates: 55.752236°N 37.614602°E
- Construction started: 1495
- Completed: 1499

Height
- Height: 80 metres (260 ft)

Design and construction
- Architect: Aloisio da Milano

The Troitskaya Tower (Russian: Троицкая башня, literally Trinity Tower) is a tower with a through-passage in the center of the northwestern wall of the Moscow Kremlin, which overlooks the Alexander Garden.

The Troitskaya Tower was built in 1495–1499 by an Italian architect Aloisio da Milano (known in Russia as Aleviz Fryazin Milanets). The tower has borne several names, including Rizopolozhenskaya, Znamenskaya, and Karetnaya. It received its current name in 1658 from the Troitskaya Coaching Inn (Троицкое подворье) in the Kremlin. The two-story basement of the tower housed a prison in the 16th–17th centuries. There is the Troitsky Bridge, which is protected by the Kutafia Tower and leads to the gates of the Troitskaya Tower. There was also a clock on top of the tower between 1585 and 1812. In 1707, due to a threat of Swedish invasion, the gun slots of the Troitskaya Tower were enlarged to fit heavy cannons. In 1935, the Soviets installed a red star on top of the Troitskaya Tower. Prior to Soviet rule the tower had an icon of the Holy Trinity atop its outward face. Because this tower was the formal entrance for huge Communist Party Congresses the icon was totally removed rather than just plastered over as were those on the Spasskaya and Nikolskaya Towers.

The Troitskaya Tower is the tallest tower of the Moscow Kremlin. Its current height on the side of the Alexander Garden together with the star is 80 metres (260 ft). Today, the gate of the tower is the main visitors' entrance into the Kremlin.

== Image Gallery ==
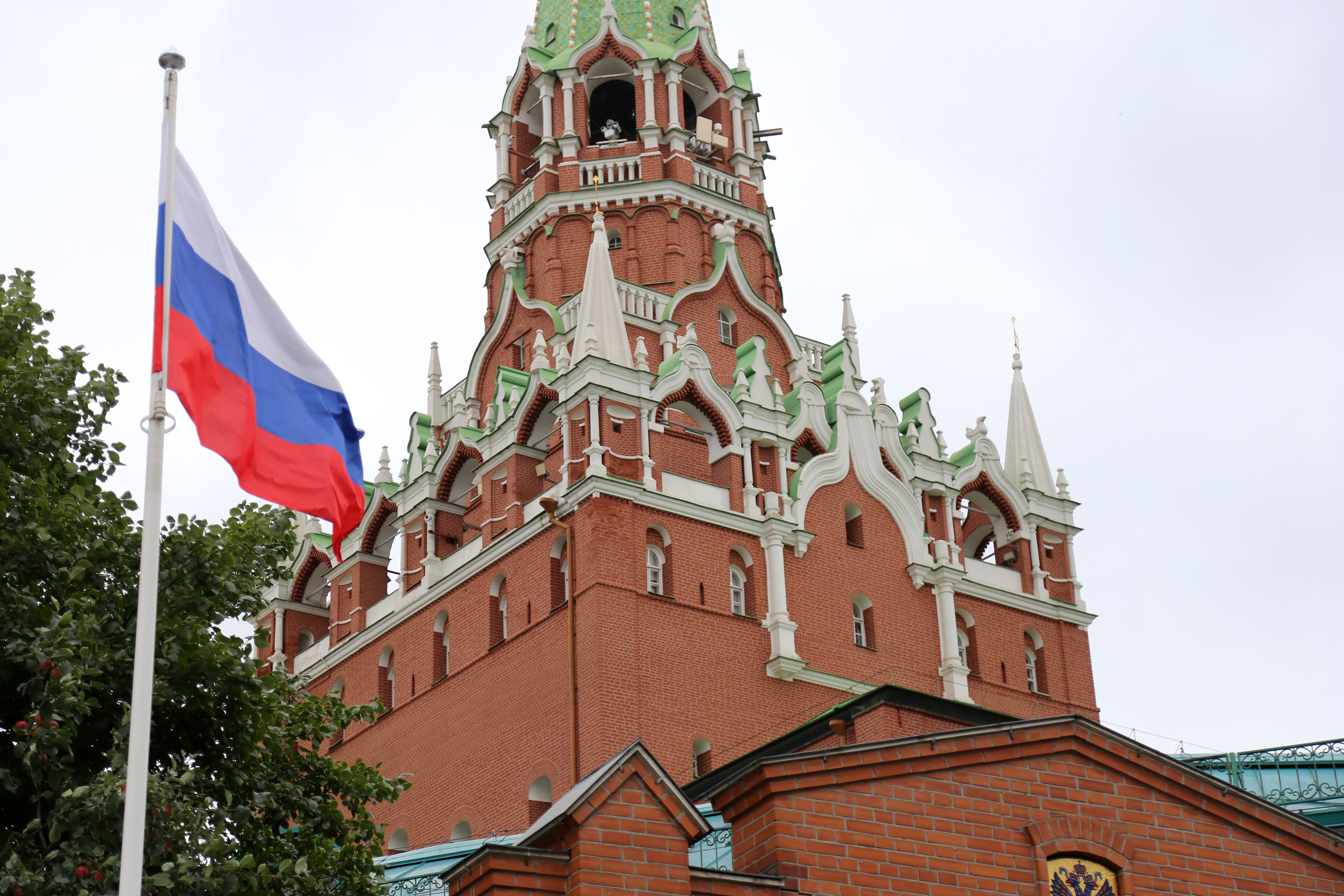
Troitskaya Tower, Moscow, Russia

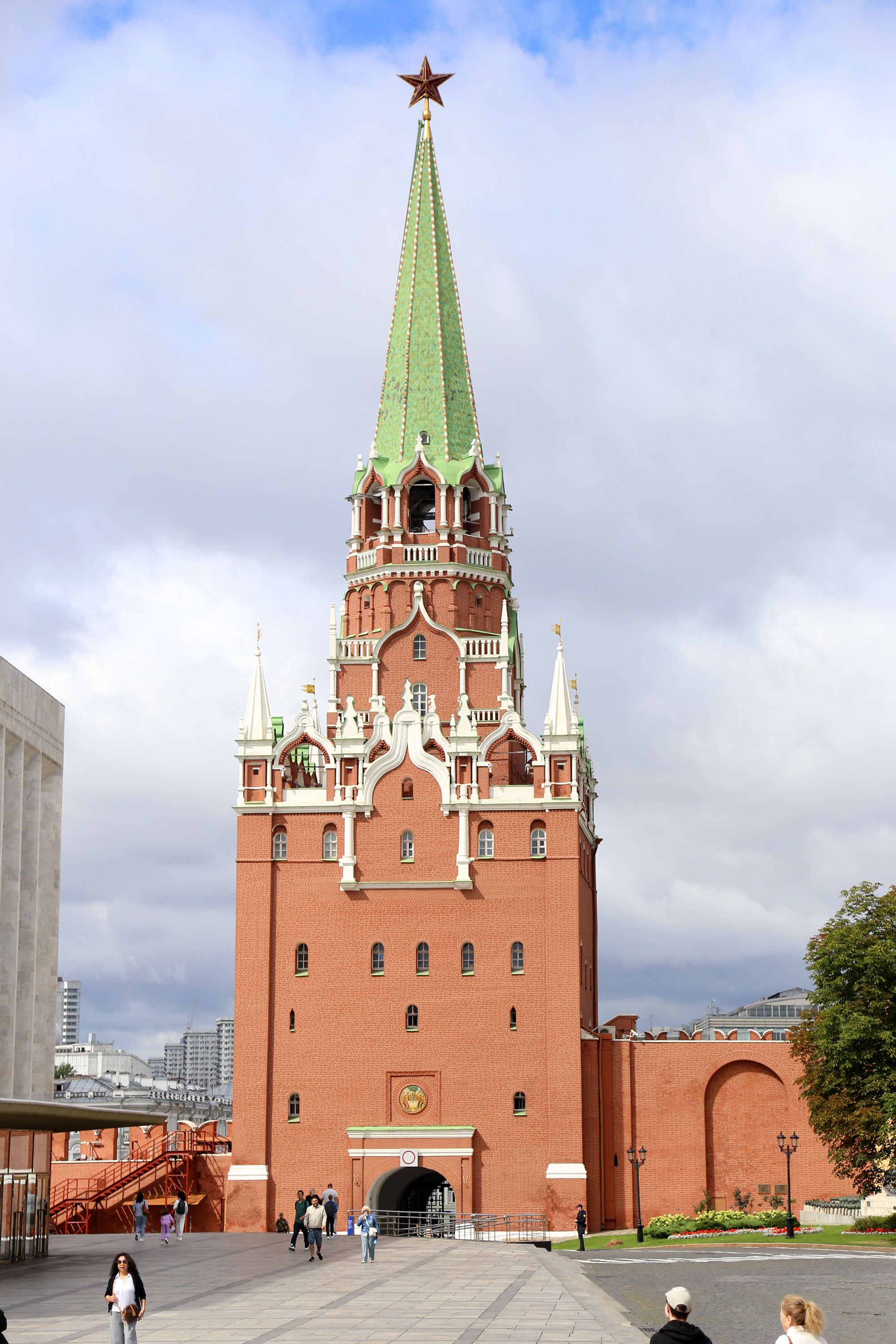
Troitskaya Tower, Moscow, Russia

Records
Preceded by Unknown	Tallest Building in the Grand Duchy of Moscow; 1499—1508; 79.9 m	Succeeded by Ivan the Great Bell Tower
Preceded by Unknown	Tallest Building in Moscow; 1499—1508; 79.9 m	Succeeded by Ivan the Great Bell Tower
