= Bell tower (wat) =

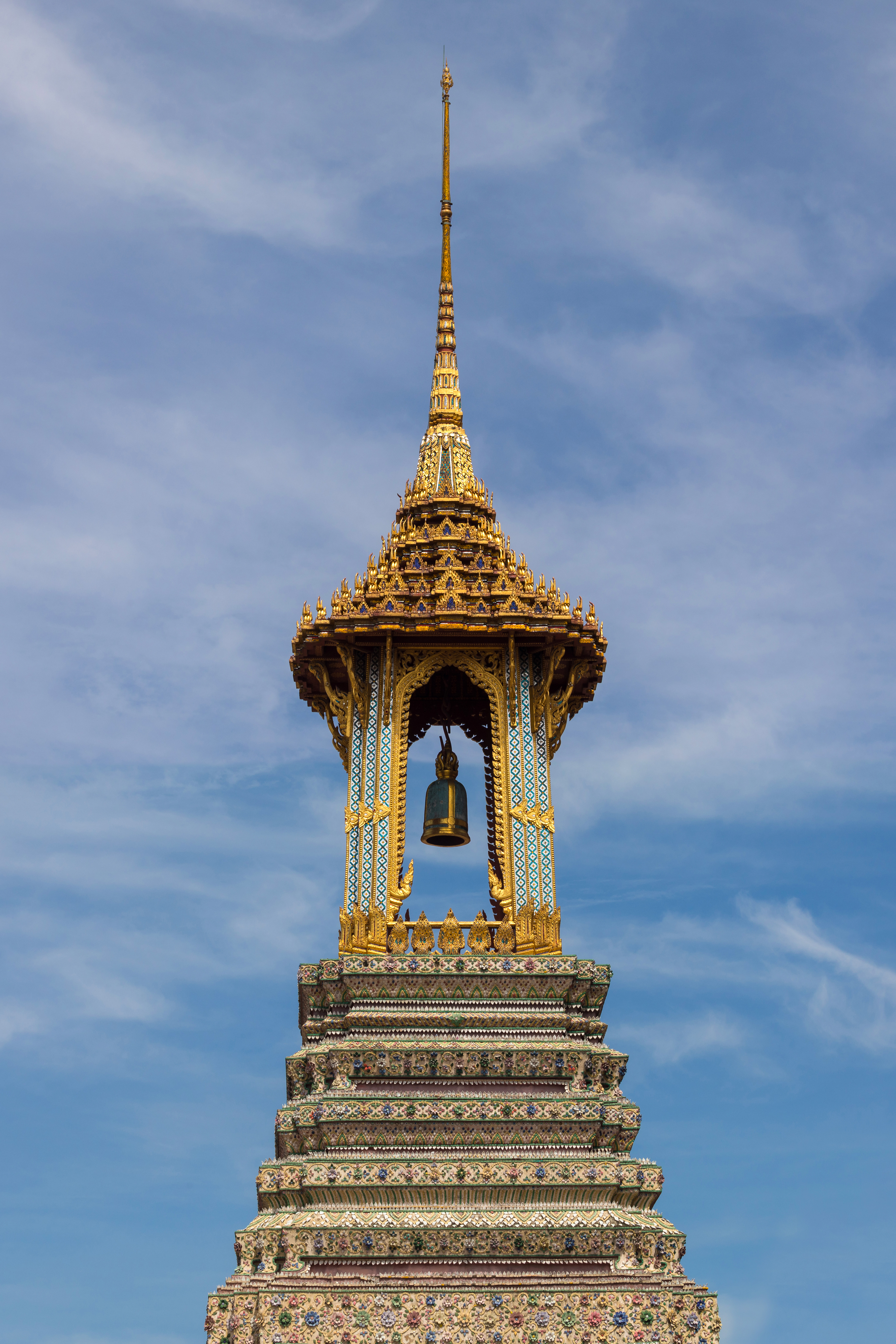
The bell tower of Wat Phra Kaew, within the precincts of the Grand Palace in Bangkok, Thailand

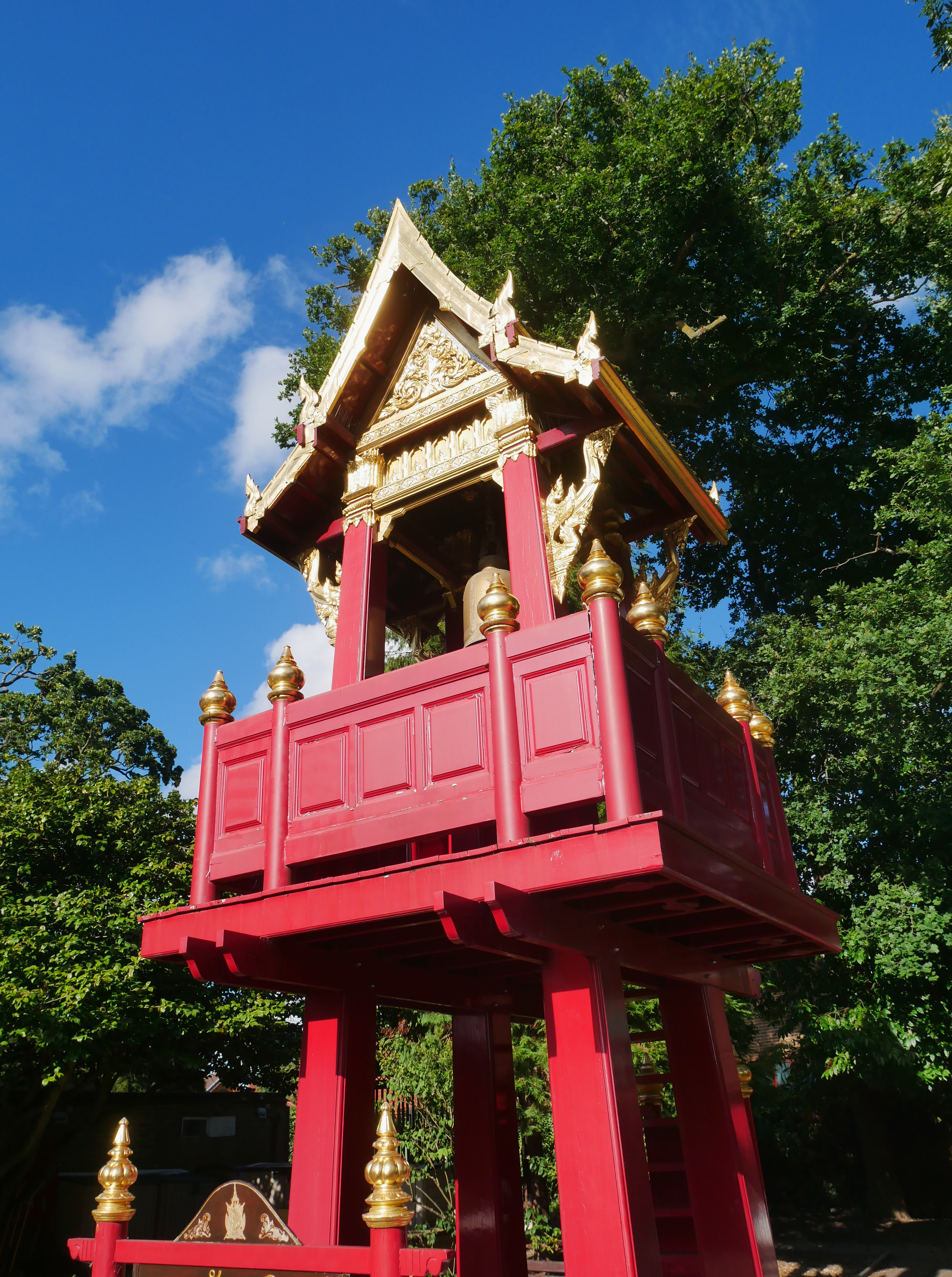
The bell tower of Wat Buddhapadipa in Wimbledon, London

Bell tower (Thai: หอระฆัง; RTGS: ho rakhang) is one category of the Thai architectural structure in a wat for signaling the monks to do their praying ceremony.

The bell tower wakes the temple residents early in the morning and calls the monks together for devotions and meals. It also announces lunchtime, as monks are not allowed to eat solid food after noon.

In contrast to Western bells, which are swung back and forth so that the clapper inside strikes the bell wall to make it ring, a bell in Thailand is permanently suspended. It is struck from the outside with a wooden stick, very slowly at first, then faster and faster. The sequence ends with one or two slow strokes.

Chinese-style drum tower in Wat Si Saket, Vientiane, Laos In a wat, neither the position of the bell towers nor their number is prescribed. In Wat Pho in Bangkok, for example, there is one bell tower in the monks' quarters and two more in the actual temple district. The reason for this may be the sheer size of the entire complex.

== Type of structure ==
- Wood
- Masonry
- Reinforced Concrete
- Composite

== Shape ==
- Square
- Hexagonal
- Octagonal
- Circle

== Roof styles ==
- Gable with Thai classical ornament
- Mondop
- Tetrahedron
- Pavilion Crown
- Thai Crown
- Chedi (bell-shaped)
- Prang
- Thai castle superstructure ornament
- Western, Chinese or other architectural style
- Combination

== Buddhism’s meaning, symbol and philosophy ==
- Wake up, attained the Truth and feeling of Peacefulness.
