= List of presidents of Russia =

The office of the president of Russia is the highest authority in the Russian Federation. The holder is the federation's head of state and has formal presidency over the State Council as well as being the commander in chief of the Russian Armed Forces. The office was introduced in 1918 after the February Revolution with the current office emerging after a referendum of 1991. During the Soviet period of history, Russia was de jure headed by collective bodies such as the All-Russian Central Executive Committee and the Presidium of the Supreme Soviet, since the Soviet theory of government denied the very necessity of the presidential office. The office of the President of the Soviet Union was introduced in 1990 during Mikhail Gorbachev's unsuccessful reforms of the Soviet Union's one-party communist state. Gorbachev became first and last president of the Union. His tenure was marked by the legal and political confrontation with Russia and other republics of the USSR which eventually led to their full independence in late 1991.

== Presidents ==
Nonpartisan CPSU NDR United Russia Unity Acting PMs
	Portrait	President	Party	Term of office	Term	Previous office	Prime Minister
1		Boris Yeltsin; Борис Ельцин; 1931–2007	Nonpartisan	10 July 1991 – 31 December 1999 (resigned from office) (8 years, 174 days)	1 (1991) (Note: Elected as President of the Russian SFSR shortly before the collapse of the Soviet Union. Continued to serve his first term until 1996 despite adopting a new constitution after a military conflict with the parliament in 1993.)	Chairman of the Supreme Soviet of Russia (1990–1991)	Ivan Silayev
1		Boris Yeltsin; Борис Ельцин; 1931–2007	Nonpartisan	10 July 1991 – 31 December 1999 (resigned from office) (8 years, 174 days)	1 (1991)	Chairman of the Supreme Soviet of Russia (1990–1991)	Himself
1		Boris Yeltsin; Борис Ельцин; 1931–2007	Nonpartisan	10 July 1991 – 31 December 1999 (resigned from office) (8 years, 174 days)	1 (1991)	Chairman of the Supreme Soviet of Russia (1990–1991)	Yegor Gaidar
1		Boris Yeltsin; Борис Ельцин; 1931–2007	Nonpartisan	10 July 1991 – 31 December 1999 (resigned from office) (8 years, 174 days)	1 (1991)	Chairman of the Supreme Soviet of Russia (1990–1991)	Viktor Chernomyrdin
1		Boris Yeltsin; Борис Ельцин; 1931–2007	Nonpartisan	10 July 1991 – 31 December 1999 (resigned from office) (8 years, 174 days)	2 (1996)	Chairman of the Supreme Soviet of Russia (1990–1991)	Sergei Kiriyenko
1		Boris Yeltsin; Борис Ельцин; 1931–2007	Nonpartisan	10 July 1991 – 31 December 1999 (resigned from office) (8 years, 174 days)	2 (1996)	Chairman of the Supreme Soviet of Russia (1990–1991)	Viktor Chernomyrdin
1		Boris Yeltsin; Борис Ельцин; 1931–2007	Nonpartisan	10 July 1991 – 31 December 1999 (resigned from office) (8 years, 174 days)	2 (1996)	Chairman of the Supreme Soviet of Russia (1990–1991)	Yevgeny Primakov
1		Boris Yeltsin; Борис Ельцин; 1931–2007	Nonpartisan	10 July 1991 – 31 December 1999 (resigned from office) (8 years, 174 days)	2 (1996)	Chairman of the Supreme Soviet of Russia (1990–1991)	Sergei Stepashin
1		Boris Yeltsin; Борис Ельцин; 1931–2007	Nonpartisan	10 July 1991 – 31 December 1999 (resigned from office) (8 years, 174 days)	2 (1996)	Chairman of the Supreme Soviet of Russia (1990–1991)	Vladimir Putin
2		Vladimir Putin; Владимир Путин; Born 1952 (age 74)	Nonpartisan (formally) Unity / United Russia (de facto)	7 May 2000 – 7 May 2008 (acting from 31 December 1999) (8 years, 128 days)	3 (2000)	Prime Minister of Russia (1999–2000)	Mikhail Kasyanov
2		Vladimir Putin; Владимир Путин; Born 1952 (age 74)	Nonpartisan (formally) Unity / United Russia (de facto)	7 May 2000 – 7 May 2008 (acting from 31 December 1999) (8 years, 128 days)	3 (2000)	Prime Minister of Russia (1999–2000)	Viktor Khristenko
2		Vladimir Putin; Владимир Путин; Born 1952 (age 74)	Nonpartisan (formally) Unity / United Russia (de facto)	7 May 2000 – 7 May 2008 (acting from 31 December 1999) (8 years, 128 days)	4 (2004)	Prime Minister of Russia (1999–2000)	Mikhail Fradkov
2		Vladimir Putin; Владимир Путин; Born 1952 (age 74)	Nonpartisan (formally) Unity / United Russia (de facto)	7 May 2000 – 7 May 2008 (acting from 31 December 1999) (8 years, 128 days)	4 (2004)	Prime Minister of Russia (1999–2000)	Viktor Zubkov
3		Dmitry Medvedev; Дмитрий Медведев; Born 1965 (age 61)	United Russia	7 May 2008 – 7 May 2012 (4 years, 0 days)	5 (2008)	First Deputy Prime Minister of Russia (2005–2008)	Vladimir Putin
(2)		Vladimir Putin; Владимир Путин; Born 1952 (age 74)	Nonpartisan (formally); United Russia (de facto); All-Russia People's Front	7 May 2012 – Present (14 years, 184 days)	6 (2012)	Prime Minister of Russia (2008–2012)	Viktor Zubkov
(2)		Vladimir Putin; Владимир Путин; Born 1952 (age 74)	Nonpartisan (formally); United Russia (de facto); All-Russia People's Front	7 May 2012 – Present (14 years, 184 days)	6 (2012)	Prime Minister of Russia (2008–2012)	Dmitry Medvedev
(2)		Vladimir Putin; Владимир Путин; Born 1952 (age 74)	Nonpartisan (formally); United Russia (de facto); All-Russia People's Front	7 May 2012 – Present (14 years, 184 days)	7 (2018)	Prime Minister of Russia (2008–2012)	Dmitry Medvedev
(2)		Vladimir Putin; Владимир Путин; Born 1952 (age 74)	Nonpartisan (formally); United Russia (de facto); All-Russia People's Front	7 May 2012 – Present (14 years, 184 days)	7 (2018)	Prime Minister of Russia (2008–2012)	Mikhail Mishustin
(2)		Vladimir Putin; Владимир Путин; Born 1952 (age 74)	Nonpartisan (formally); United Russia (de facto); All-Russia People's Front	7 May 2012 – Present (14 years, 184 days)	8 (2024)	Prime Minister of Russia (2008–2012)	Mikhail Mishustin

== Acting presidents ==
Nonpartisan NPSR NDR Unity
Portrait	Acting President	Term of office	Main post	Party	Notes
	Alexander Rutskoy; Александр Руцкой; Born 1947 (age 79)	22 September – 4 October 1993	Vice President	People's Party "Free Russia"	Acting president during the 1993 constitutional crisis. His powers were not recognized by Boris Yeltsin.
	Viktor Chernomyrdin; Виктор Черномырдин; 1938–2010 (aged 72)	5–6 November 1996	Prime Minister	Our Home – Russia	Acting president during Boris Yeltsin's heart surgery.
	Vladimir Putin; Владимир Путин; Born 1952 (age 74)	31 December 1999 – 7 May 2000	Prime Minister	Independent (formally); Unity (de facto)	Acting president after Yeltsin's early resignation.

== Timeline ==
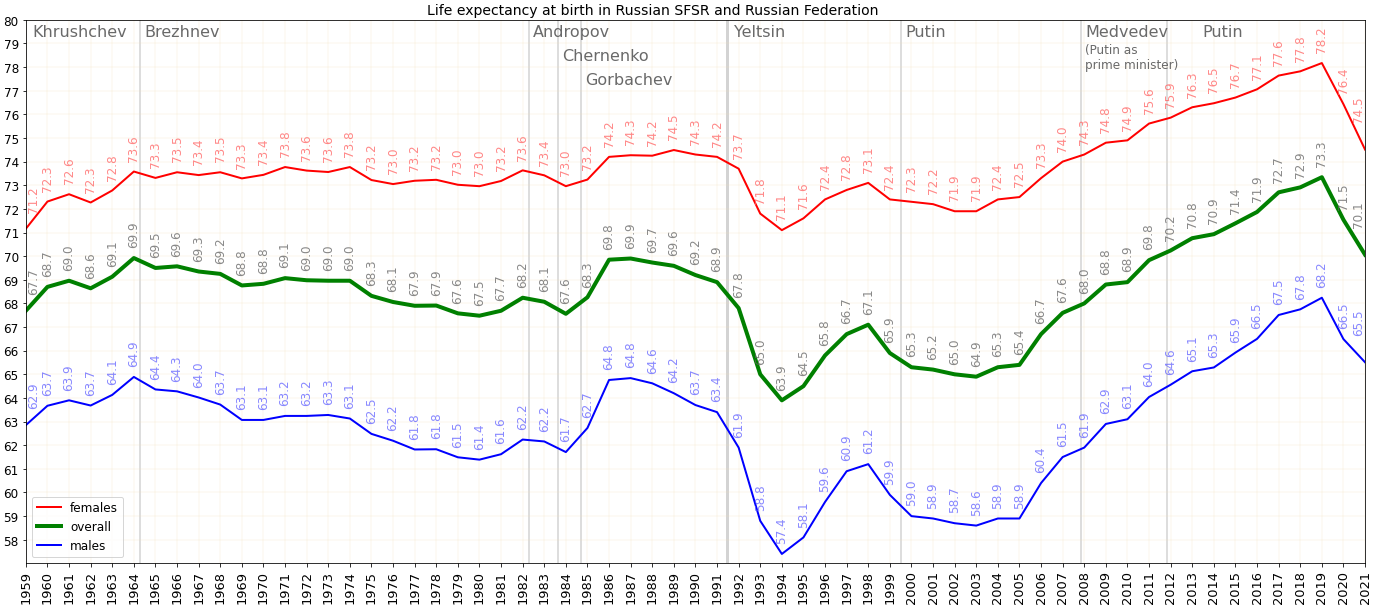
Graph of change of life expectancy in the Russian SFSR and Russia under various leaders

== Subsequent public service ==
Two presidents held other high offices after leaving the presidency.

President	Presidency	Subsequent service
Vladimir Putin	2000–2008	Prime Minister (2008–2012)
Vladimir Putin	2000–2008	President (2012–present)
Dmitry Medvedev	2008–2012	Prime Minister (2012–2020)
Dmitry Medvedev	2008–2012	Deputy Chairman of the Security Council (2020–present)

== See also ==
- President of Russia
- List of leaders of Russia
  - List of Russian monarchs (before 1917)
  - List of heads of state of Russia (from 1917)
- Politics of Russia
- Government of Russia
