= Lesnoy Dozor =

Lesnoy Dozor (Russian: Лесной Дозор, literally, "Forest Watch") is a project for the online and offline observation of wooded areas and early detection of forest fires. The project was supported by the Russian "Silicon Valley", the Skolkovo innovation center, and Rostec. 10 scientific start-ups worked on the program.

The system was developed and implemented by DiSiCon LLC – a scientific company.

== Architecture ==
Various types of sensors (video and infrared cameras, thermal observation devices, etc.) are placed on towers (fire detection or mobile radio towers) with a power supply. They are controlled via the Internet and provide rotation, digital zoom and videotape recording. One operator can control about 10 sensors.

== Recognition ==
On 7 July 2011 the system was presented to Russian President Dmitry Medvedev at an international educational forum Seliger, who gave his official support. The system covers 20 regions of Russia.
