= Wide Putin Walking =

Internet meme

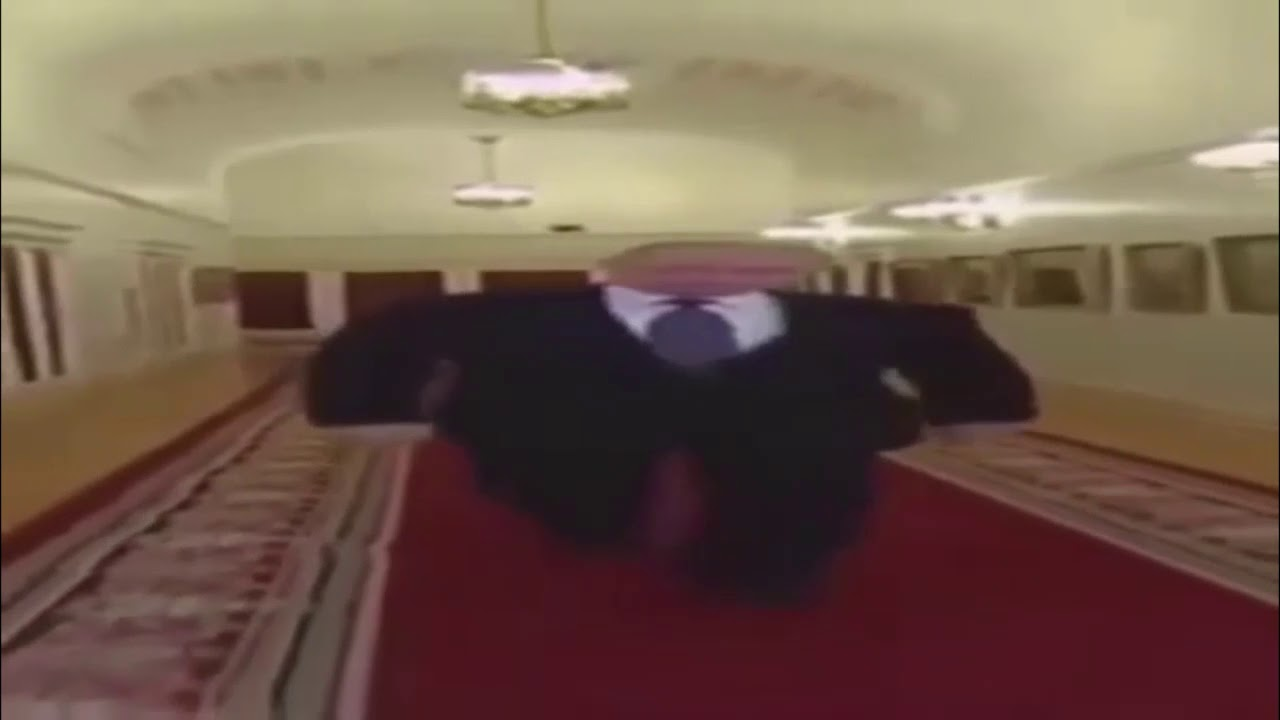
A still frame of the Wide Putin Walking meme

Wide Putin Walking (also known as Wide Putin) is an internet meme and a viral video which shows a wide version of President of Russia Vladimir Putin walking through the corridors of the Kremlin accompanied with the track "Song for Denise (Maxi Version)" by Piano Fantasia. The video first appeared online in early February 2020 and became popular in May 2020 when it was shared through multiple social media platforms, primarily on YouTube and Discord.

== Origin ==
The oldest known "Wide Putin" meme was posted on a Russian-language Telegram channel called "Ruchka" on 2 February 2020. The creator of "Ruchka" said he was the first to make the "wide" video of Putin. He said: "I got the idea for the music while watching "Careful, Modern! 2" [Russian comedy show], where a character walked in fast motion to it. I only noticed the popularity in the summer when I accidentally found a repost of my video on another channel".

The video footage was taken from Vladimir Putin's inauguration for his fourth term, which was broadcast by RT on 7 May 2018. In the original video, Putin walks for a very long time through the empty Kremlin corridors. Putin was filmed in one continuous shot for several minutes before getting into a car to go to the Grand Kremlin Palace.

The original author made Putin's figure look wider and added the track "Song for Denise (Maxi Version)" by Piano Fantasia, which was used in later versions. The meme became more popular in May and June 2020, when users on Discord and YouTube started sharing other versions of the video with an even wider Vladimir Putin. Users made the Russian President "wider and wider".

The original video also became popular back in 2018. The appeal likely came from Putin's confident walk and the long way from his office to the ceremony hall. Russian users made memes from the video, and on English-language YouTube, a version where Putin walks to the song "Stayin' Alive" by the Bee Gees went viral.

== Content ==
The "Wide Putin Walking" meme is abstract and absurd. The video shows a stretched version of Vladimir Putin moving through his office. He puts on his suit jacket and buttons it up, then he rolls up his left sleeve, followed by his right sleeve before walking out the first door into a corridor. There, he greets an employee of his administration with a handshake, adjusts his tie, and enters a second corridor to adjust his tie again. Next, Putin looks at a painting and walks into a third corridor. Putin continues walking, sees an officer, and enters another corridor. He rubs his hands together, looks to the right, then to the left, right again, left again, right once more, and notices a painting on his right. Then, the politician turns and walks towards the fifth floor as Putin keeps on walking.

== Public reaction and memes ==
=== Memes ===
A popular "wide" version of the internet meme was uploaded to YouTube on 27 May 2020, with the title "Wide Putin Walking". As of September 2022, the video had several million views. Soon, a Discord server called "ITS HIM" was created to share the meme with other online communities. According to Google Trends, searches for the "Wide Putin" meme increased sharply around the world in late May and early June 2020.

In early June, multiple variants of the meme appeared on YouTube where users would set the video to different music, video styles, and Putin's proportions. Notable example of this includes the popular video "Wide Putin Walking but every time he turns he gets wider", where Vladimir Putin becomes more and more stretched out each time he turns a corner, while others show 1 and even 10-hour-long versions of Putin walking through the hallway.

The meme gradually spread to other platforms like Twitter. Sometimes, the original "wide" Putin video was shared without any changes. On Reddit, the video became a template, users added different captions to it to create new jokes. Russian and American TikTokers quickly started making their own parodies using the meme. As The Moscow Times noted, one comment on the original YouTube video described the meme as: "The feeling when a 5-year-old calls a 14-year-old 'sir'".

The trend was very popular with users, so people continued to post ridiculous versions of "Wide Putin" throughout July 2020. Some users added the original meme footage into clips from cartoons, live streams, movies, and other viral videos. As Russian internet portal Medialeaks reported, Putin's appearance in these videos "caused the characters to react with wild delight, laughter, and surprise." The meme led to many crossovers, Vladimir Putin even "met" the character Dio Brando from JoJo's Bizarre Adventure. People posted videos of Putin walking through different locations and fandoms, such as Minecraft, Shrek, Rick and Morty, and even in front of the Statue of Liberty.

Videos of the Wide Putin flooded social networks and became the basis for a larger meme trend. The new objects of the meme were animals, other politicians, and video game and movie characters that were also stretched out. By the end of July 2020, the internet memes with Putin had evolved into parodies featuring other characters and became a much bigger trend. Other world leaders were also "widened," for example, Kim Jong Un, Alexander Lukashenko, and Volodymyr Zelenskyy. Videos also appeared with wide versions of video game and movie characters, such as CJ from GTA, Darth Vader, Joaquin Phoenix's Joker, Mario from Super Mario Bros., and Russian politician Mikhail Svetov.

The impact of the "Wide Putin" internet meme can also be seen on the YouTube video for the song "Song for Denise". The song was initially released in 1985 and re-released in 2012. However, by June 2020, the video had over 150,000 views, and most of the comments on it were about Putin due to its use in the meme.

=== Media reaction ===
Samantha Berkhed from The Moscow Times called the meme "the supercut, set to an infectious disco instrumental (...) To emulate Wide Putin is to take on a hyper-inflated sense of power, machismo and masculinity".

German website BedeutungOnline, which explains the meanings of words, terms, and phrases, noted that the meme "is funny because of the distorted video, the music, and its repetitiveness. Vladimir Putin is only shown walking and looking. Because of the distorted video fragment, Vladimir Putin becomes narrower and wider. (...) The meme probably isn't meant to make fun of Vladimir Putin. The changing size is more likely meant to make the politician seem less serious. From a US perspective, it could be a way of dealing with a Russian political opponent, as the meme relativizes Putin's true greatness (and power). The meme can also be understood in the context of the scandals about Vladimir Putin's influence on US elections and Donald Trump".

At the end of 2020, users of the Russian social network VKontakte chose the best memes of the year through a vote in the "Battle of the Memes" mini-app. As a result, VKontakte included the Wide Putin Walking meme in its list of the 10 most popular memes of 2020 among its users (6th place).

=== Politicians ===
After Vladimir Putin praised President of Brazil Jair Bolsonaro for his masculinity at the BRICS conference in the fall of 2020, Bolsonaro joined the "flashmob". In a tweet from November 2020, he shared a "Wide Putin"-format meme, calling it a "good video".
