= Inauguration of Dmitry Medvedev =

2008 inauguration

2008 presidential inauguration of Dmitry Medvedev
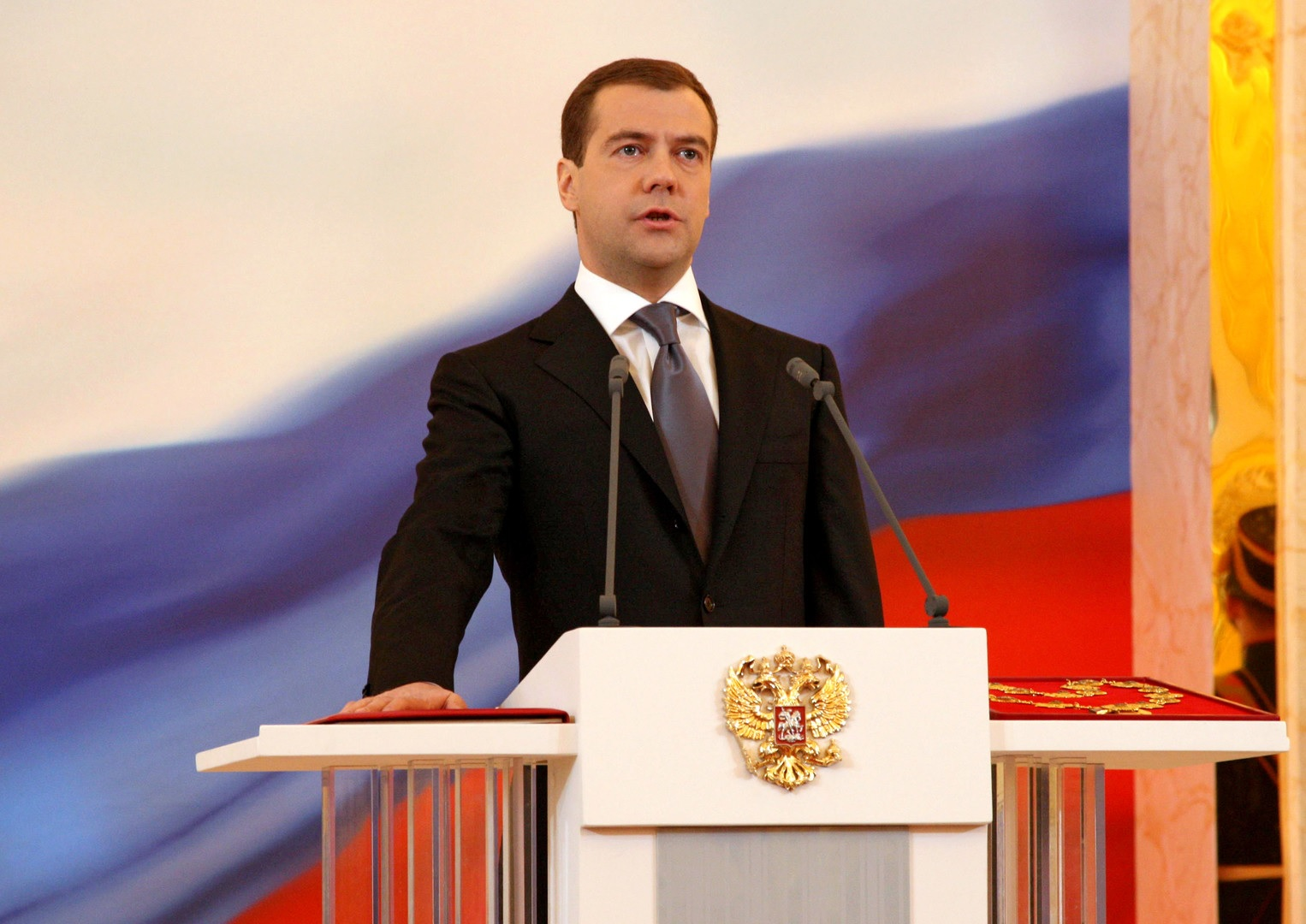
- Dmitry Medvedev takes the oath of office as the president of Russia
- Date: May 7, 2008; 18 years ago
- Location: Grand Kremlin Palace, Moscow
- Participants: President of Russia, Dmitry Medvedev Assuming office President of Russia, Vladimir Putin Leaves office President of the Constitutional Court of Russia, Valery Zorkin Administering oath

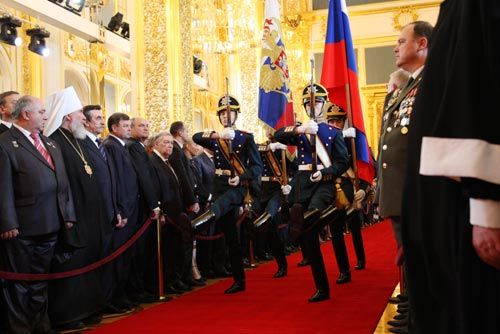
Soldiers carrying the flag of Russia and flag of president of Russia

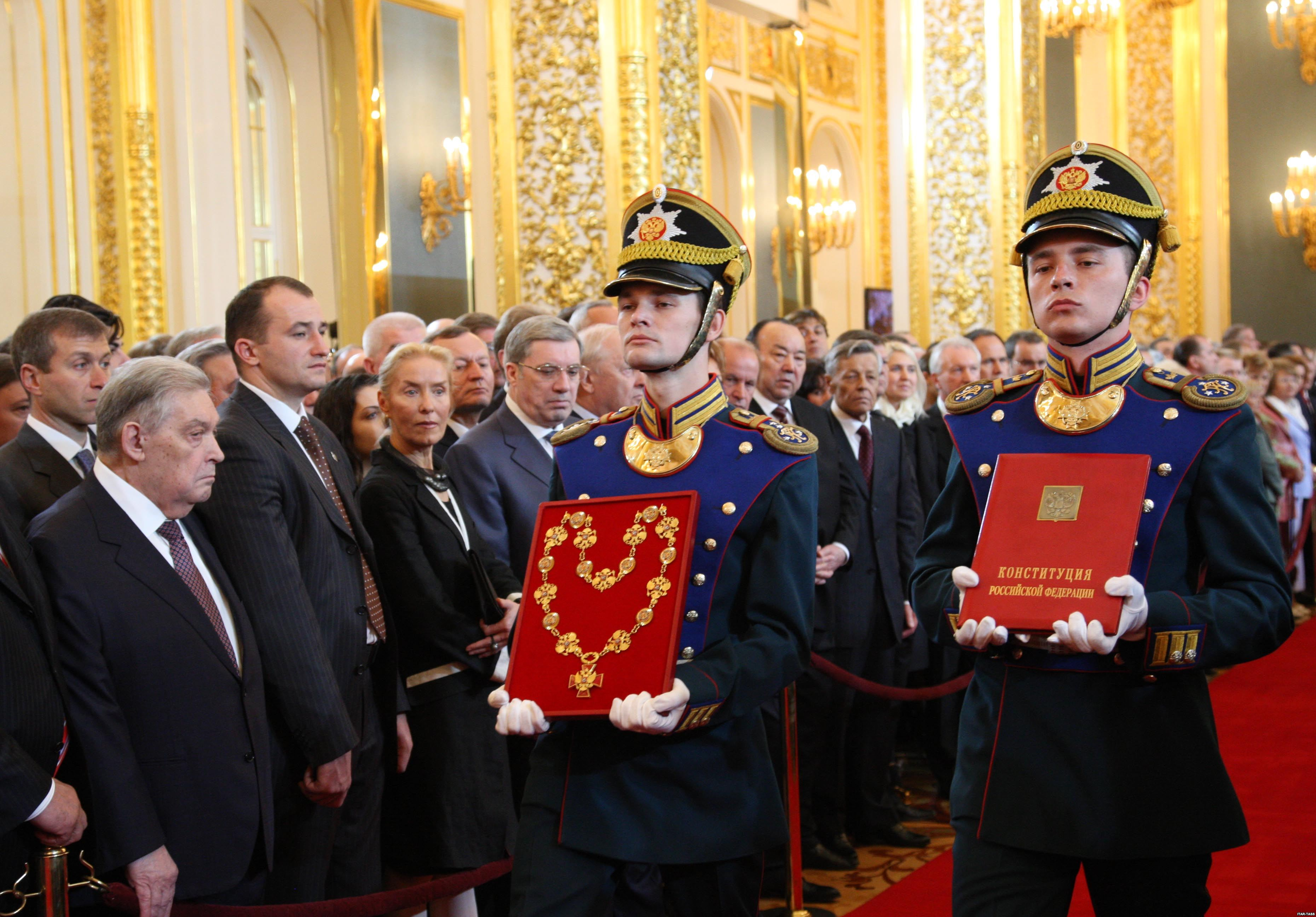
Soldiers carrying the Constitution of Russia and sign of the president of Russia

The Inauguration of Dmitry Medvedev as the president of Russia took place on Wednesday, May 7, 2008. The ceremony was held at the Grand Kremlin Palace and lasted about one hour.

At the ceremony attended by about 2,400 guests. These were the ministers and governors, deputies and senators, foreign ambassadors and religious leaders, scientists and artists.

== Background ==
Dmitry Medvedev won the 2008 Russian presidential election with more than seventy percent of the votes. He took office two months after the elections.

== Ceremony ==
The ceremony was held under the same scenario as the previous two.

=== Main part ===
First introduced the Russian flag and flag of the Russian president, a special copy of the Russian constitution and the sign of the president of Russia.

Then on the podium were invited President of the Constitutional Court Valery Zorkin, Chairman of the Federation Council Sergey Mironov and Chairman of the State Duma Boris Gryzlov.

At that time, Vladimir Putin, left the residence of the president of Russia and went to the Cathedral Square, where he received a report Kremlin Regiment commander and thanked the soldiers for their service. Then he went to the State Kremlin Palace to attend the ceremony.

Dmitry Medvedev's motorcade arrived at the Kremlin and with the battle Kremlin chimes elected president entered St. George's Hall. After passing through St. George and Alexander Hall, Medvedev took the stage in the hall of St. Andrew.

=== Speech of Vladimir Putin ===
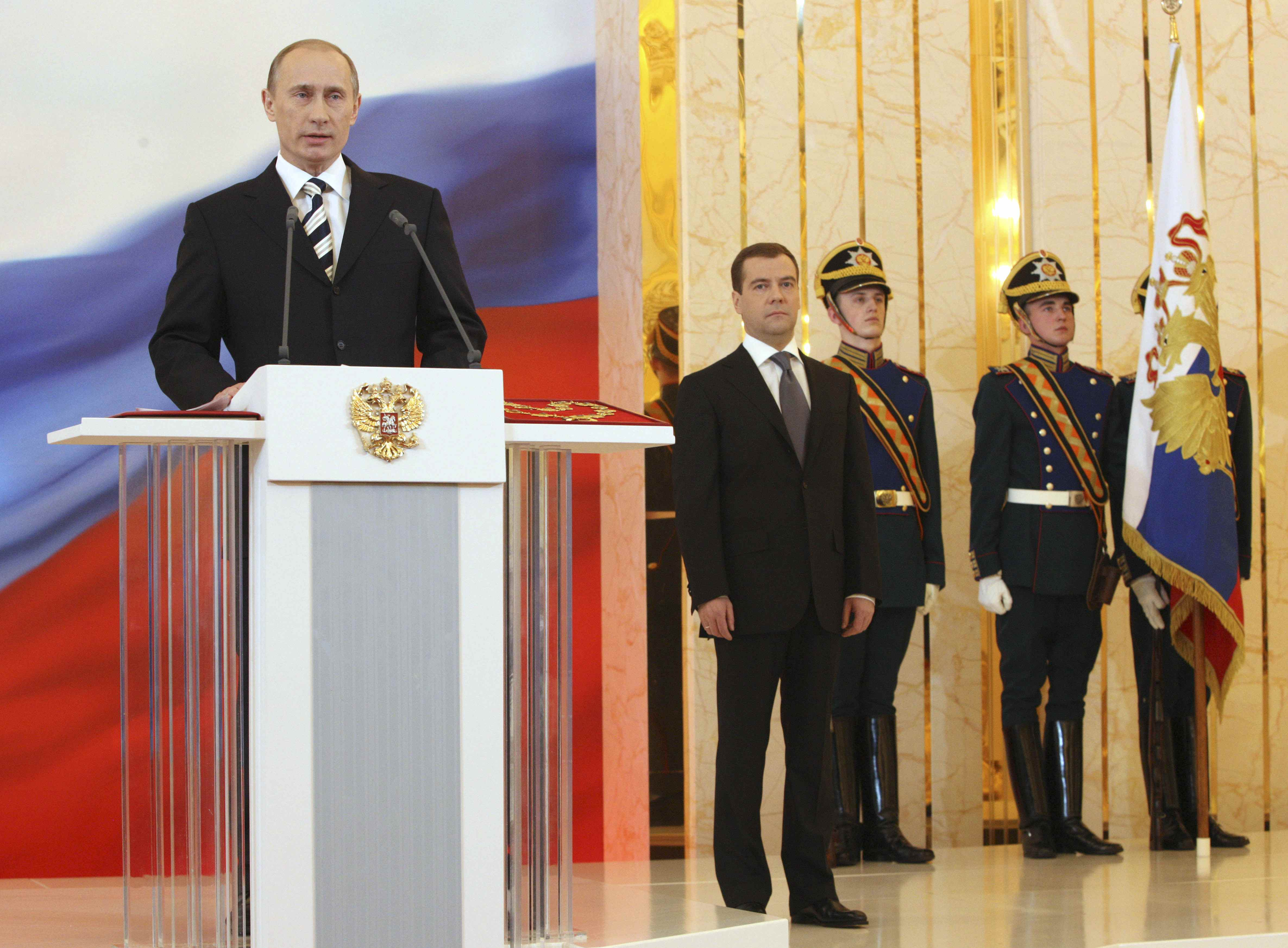
Vladimir Putin gives congratulatory speech

The first speech was made by Vladimir Putin:

Dear citizens of Russia, dear friends!

Introduction of the newly elected president of the office - this is a very important stage of democratic design power. Stage, which should be a unifying and for all regions of the country, and for all the national political forces and civil society. Now it is essential to continue all together already taken and proven the country's development course, guided by the interests of its citizens. We generally update completes the highest state authorities. Update on the basis of strict compliance with the laws and principles of democracy, with a single day without delay to the solution of urgent problems of citizens. We move forward without losing the pace of development of the country.

I am convinced that the only way is constantly thinking about the welfare of people, the development potential of every person, the state can also be social, and really advanced. We can make a breakthrough innovation and strengthen its role in the world. Today, on the eve of Victory Day, we feel particularly acute, which has spiritual power of our people. The people, not just to defend their own path and their own state, and made a great contribution to the preservation and progress of civilization in the world of science, art, culture.

Dear friends! Eight years ago, the first time taking the oath the president of Russia, I took the commitment to work openly and honestly, to faithfully serve the people and the state. And his promise not violated.

I am convinced that the morality of power and its binding - is the main guarantee of the people's trust. They are no less important than the experience and professional knowledge, and the need to produce results, reaching for the benefit of the whole society.

Now, I resign the head of state, would also like to say - for me the obligation to protect Russia was and remains the highest civic duty. I followed him all these years and will follow all his life.

I particularly stress for such a large multinational, multi-religious country like Russia is vital to safeguard and further strengthen its unity. The unity of the state, the goal, the unity of national spirit.

Dear citizens of Russia! Dear friends!

I cordially thank you for your faith, your understanding and support. Support I felt during all eight years as president, and that gave me strength, gave assurance that we are doing the right thing. I thank you all for the fact that we walked together towards agreed goals, overcoming challenges together experiencing the tragedy did not stop in front of the most seemingly insurmountable obstacles. Yes, the work was not without faults and without errors, but we still have serious concrete results and were able to make a breakthrough to a new life. And today, we have to formulate targets and tasks are not for a month, not two, but twenty or thirty years. Putting a large-scale problem, I am absolutely convinced that we are on the shoulder. But only with your active participation and direct with your support.

Thank you.

Transmitting today Dmitry Medvedev, a symbol of state power, I wish him good luck and success as president of the Russian Federation. We will support it.

=== Oath ===
The national anthem of Russia at the inauguration of Dmitry Medvedev

After the speech of Vladimir Putin, Valery Zorkin invited Dmitry Medvedev to take the oath.

Dmitry Medvedev read the text of the oath:

I swear in exercising the powers of the President of the Russian Federation to respect and protect the rights and freedoms of man and citizen, to respect and defend the Constitution of the Russian Federation, to protect the sovereignty and independence, security and integrity of the state, to faithfully serve the people.

After that, the Russian national anthem sounded, and the Kremlin walls was made Artillery salute of thirty-one salvo.

=== Speech of Dmitry Medvedev ===
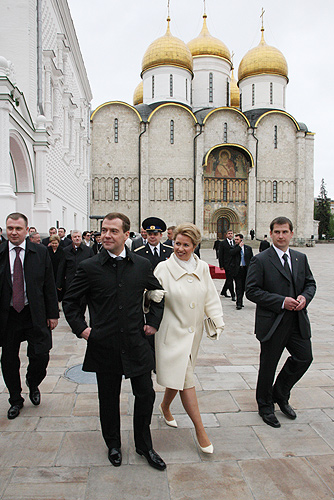
President Dmitry Medvedev and First Lady Svetlana Medvedeva

After taking the oath, and the end of the anthem, Dmitry Medvedev delivered his first speech as President of Russia.

Dear citizens of Russia, dear friends!

I have just sworn the presidential oath, it is given to the Russian people, and in its very first lines - the obligation to respect and protect human rights and freedoms. They found the highest value in our society, and they determine the meaning and content of all state activity.

In this regard, I consider my most important task of further development of civil and economic freedoms, the creation of new, most opportunities for self-realization of citizens - citizens, free and responsible, both for his personal success and the prosperity of the whole country.

Such people create high dignity of the nation and are the source of power of the state - the state that has today the necessary resources, and a clear understanding of their national interests.

I would like to assure all citizens of the country today, that I will work as hard power as the President and as a person, for whom Russian - is the native house, native land.

Over the past eight years, a strong foundation for long-term development was created just for decades of free and stable development. And this unique opportunity we have to make the most of Russia to become one of the best countries in the world, the best - for a comfortable, confident and secure life of our people: in this - our strategy, and this - a landmark for years to come.

I am fully aware of how much remains to be done - to make the state to be really fair and caring towards the citizens in order to ensure the highest standards of living to as many people as possible can classify themselves as middle class, you can get a good education and quality services in the field of public health.

We are committed to innovation in all spheres of life, to build the most advanced production, modernize industry and agriculture, create powerful incentives for private investment, and generally seek to ensure that Russia has firmly established itself among the leading technological and intellectual development.

Particular attention on the fundamental role of law, which is based on our state and our civil society. We must achieve a true respect for the law and overcome legal nihilism, which seriously hinders modern development.

Mature and effective legal system - is an important condition for the development of economy and social sphere, support for entrepreneurship and the fight against corruption. But not to a lesser extent, they serve to strengthen Russia's role in the world community, contribute to its openness to the world and facilitating dialogue as equals with other peoples.

And, finally, a genuine rule of law is possible only if a safe life. And I'll do anything to security of citizens was not only guaranteed by law but is genuinely guaranteed by the state.

Said task I require daily interaction with all responsible political forces and civil society institutions, with the parties, with the Russian regions.

I hope that the peace and harmony in our common home will continue to strengthen the cooperation of different religions, social groups and national cultures: from this right depends on the present and the future of our country.

Dear friends! Do you realize how deep the feelings I am experiencing. I am well aware of what the burden of responsibility falls on my shoulders, and look forward to our work together.

I sincerely thank President Vladimir Putin for his ongoing personal support I have always felt. I am sure that this will continue.

The life and the course of history present us with fundamentally new, even more complex tasks. But convinced that achieving them is absolutely on the forces of our country, its hardworking and talented people.

And now my duty - to serve him every day and every hour, to make a better life for all our people, their success and confidence in the future, for the sake of further rise and prosperity of our beloved homeland - our great Russia.

=== Final part ===
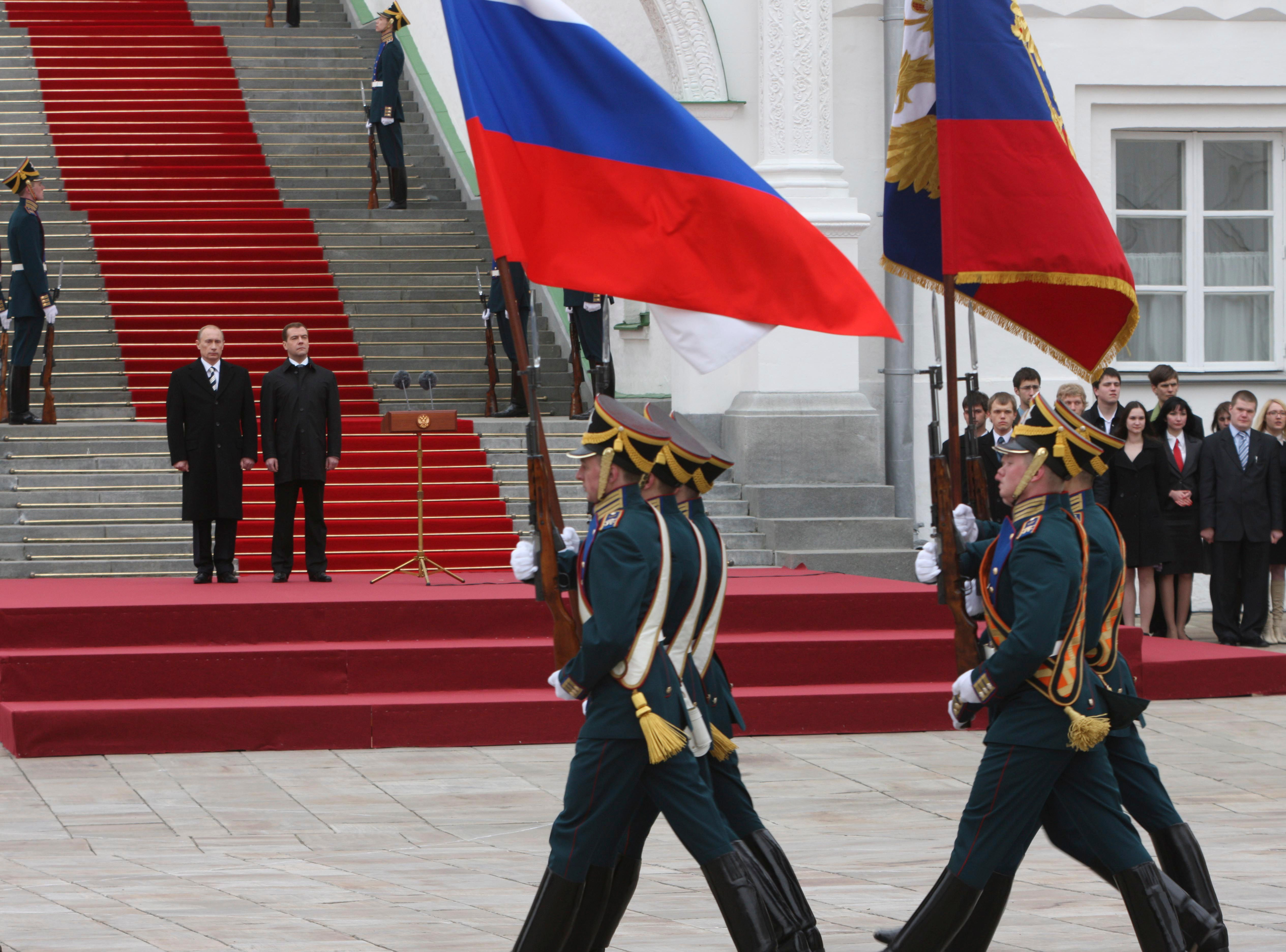
Parade

Dmitry Medvedev and Vladimir Putin went to the closed from outside the room where the outgoing president handed over the new head of state "nuclear briefcase".

After that, Medvedev and Putin came to the Cathedral Square, where the outgoing head of state presented the Kremlin regiment of the new Supreme Commander. Vladimir Putin and Dmitry Medvedev held a parade of troops and, at the end of the ceremony, went to receive congratulations.

== Congratulations from foreign leaders ==
With the assumption of office of the president of Russia, Dmitry Medvedev received congratulations from many foreign leaders. Among them were: US President George W. Bush, Prime Minister of Ukraine Yulia Tymoshenko, Chinese President Hu Jintao and others.
