= Russian presidential inauguration =

Ceremony to mark the start of a term of a Russian president

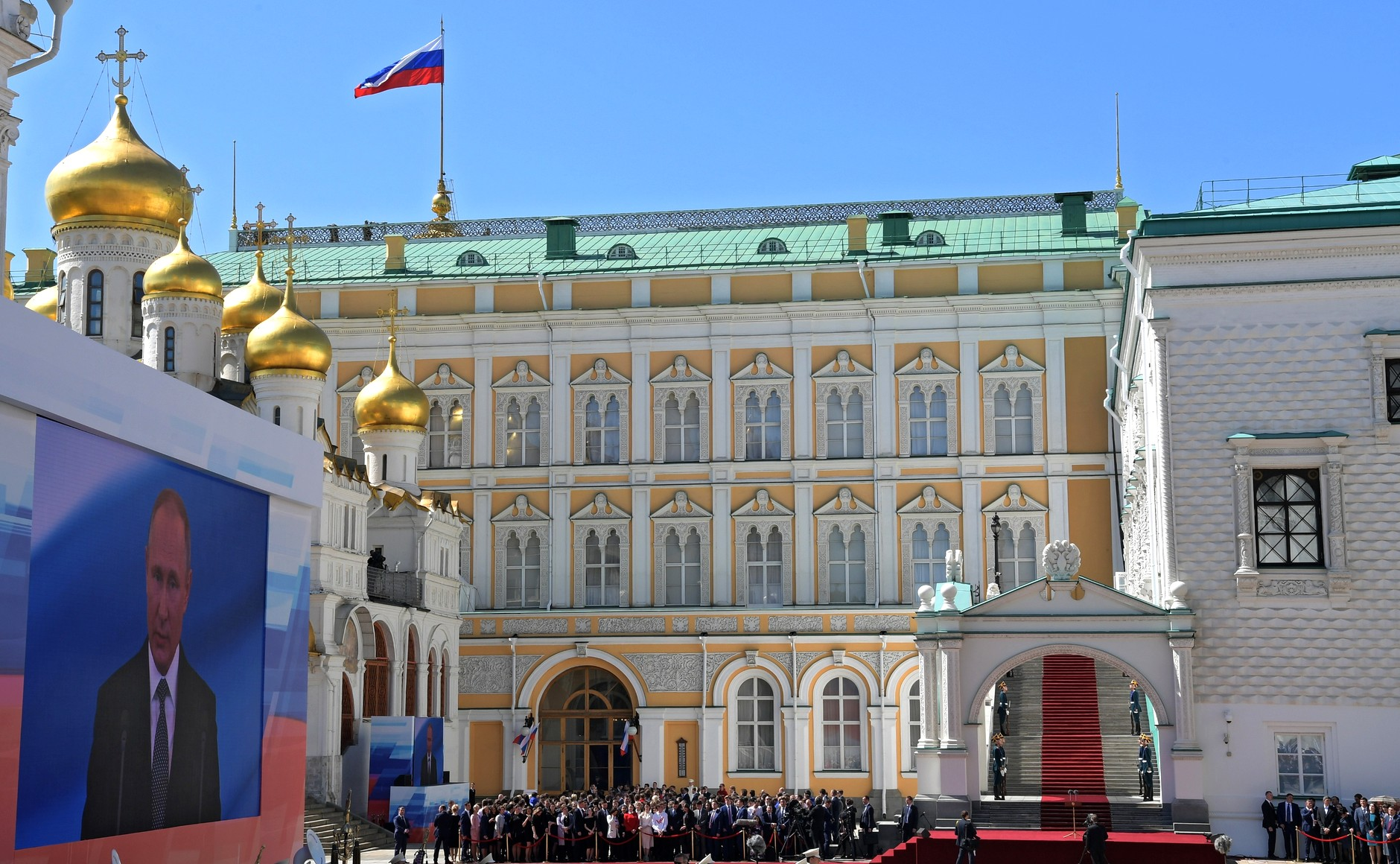
Presidential inauguration at the Grand Kremlin Palace – Vladimir Putin, May 7, 2018

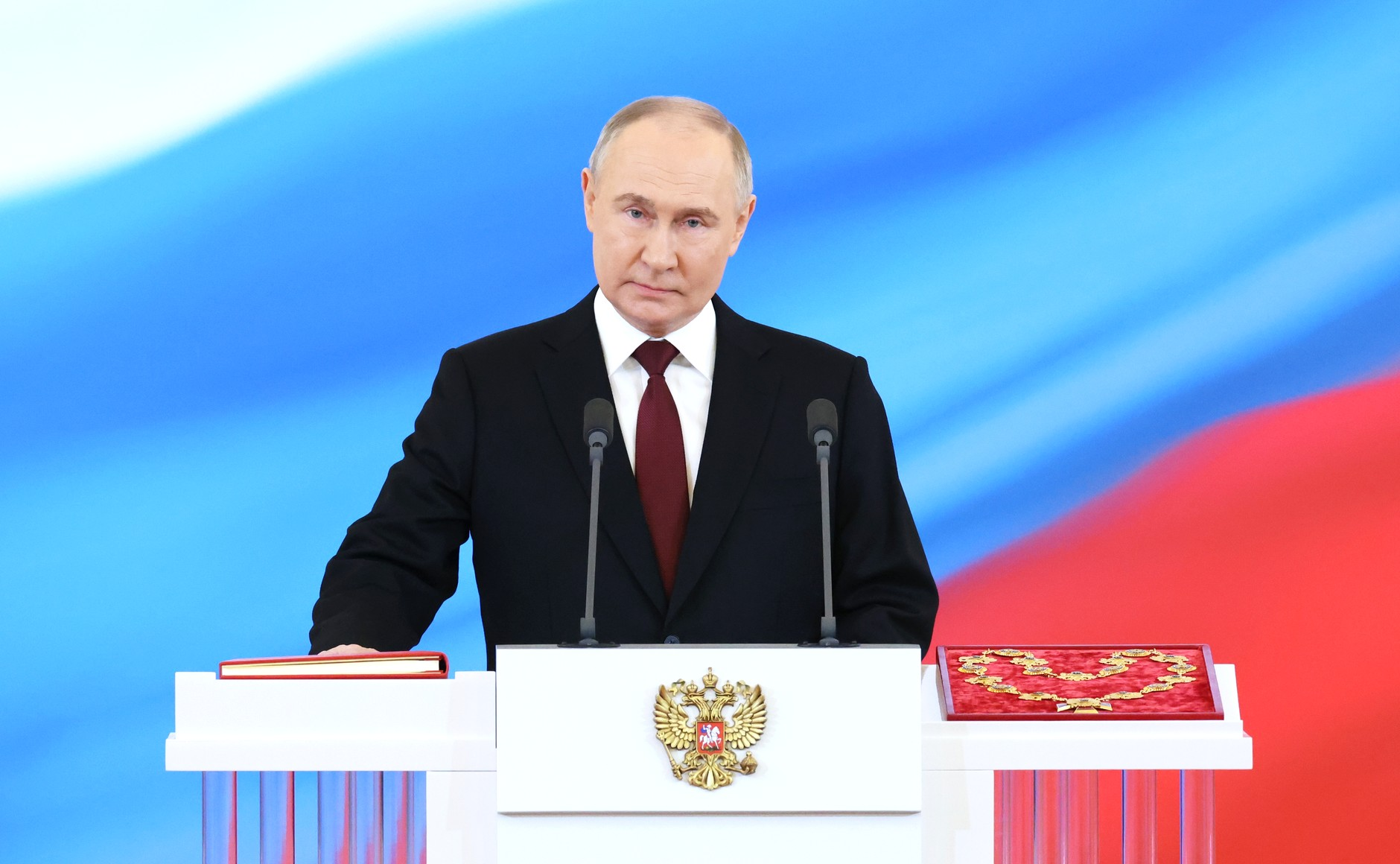
Putin during his inauguration, May 7, 2024.

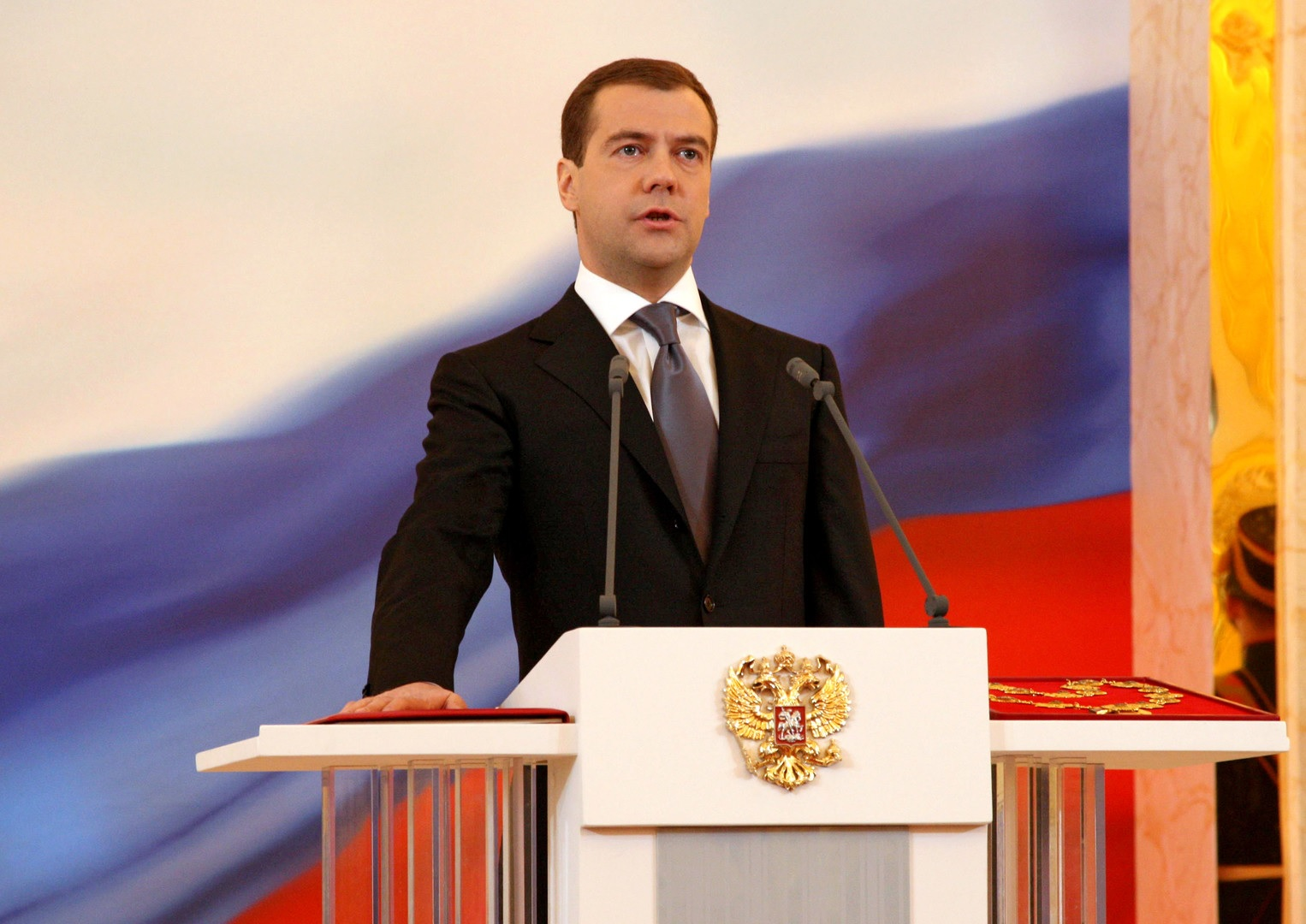
Inauguration of Dmitry Medvedev, 3rd president of Russia, May 7, 2008

The Russian presidential inauguration (Russian: Инаугурация президента Российской Федерации, romanized: Inauguratsiya prezidenta Rossiyskoy Federatsii) is a ceremony to mark the start of a term of the president of Russia. The president's term is six years (formerly four years). In the case of extraordinary election, the inauguration is conducted thirty days after the announcement of the official election results by the Central Election Commission of Russia. Since Vladimir Putin's first inauguration in 2000, the ceremony took place in the Grand Kremlin Palace of the Moscow Kremlin. The inauguration ceremony of the Russian president has traditionally been accompanied by the festive prayer service of the Patriarch of Moscow and all Rus', which dates back to 1498, when the first wedding took place for the reign of Prince Dmitry Ivanovich, the grandson of Ivan III.

== Traditions ==
The following people are usually present at the inauguration:

- Members of the Federation Council of Russia
- State Duma deputies
- The judges of the Constitutional Court
- Heads of diplomatic missions
- Representatives of the Government of the Russian Federation and federal authorities
- Diplomatic corps

The ceremony in the Grand Kremlin Palace begins (since 2008) when the Presidential Band of the Russian Federation from the Kremlin Regiment plays the Festival Coronation March by Pyotr Ilyich Tchaikovsky.

== Ceremony ==
The inauguration proper starts with the outgoing President reviewing the Kremlin Regiment for one last time as President and Supreme Commander of the uniformed forces of the Federation in Cathedral Square and he then walks towards the Grand Kremlin Palace.

The President-elect's procession arrives at the Grand Kremlin Palace through the Spassky Gate. The President-elect passes through St. George's Hall and St. Andrews's Hall into Alexander Hall, which holds the flags of the Russian Standard of the President and the Emblem of the Russian president. The President of the Constitutional Court of Russia and the Chairmen of both chambers of the Federal Assembly sit at a raised platform where the President-elect joins them. The President of the Constitutional Court places both a copy of Constitution and the President's Chain of Office on the rostrum. After the outgoing President makes his address, the President of the Constitutional Court of Russia then asks the President-elect to take the oath of office.

The president-elect places his right hand on the Constitution of the Russian Federation and recites the presidential oath. The President of the Constitutional Court then gives the President the chain of office and proclaims the inauguration of a new President. After the new president is inaugurated the Russian national anthem is played and the standard of the head of state is raised at the dome of the presidential residence. This is followed by the new President's speech and as the speech ends and the new President leaves the halls "Slavsya" by Mikhail Glinka from his first opera A Life for the Tsar is played by the military band as a 21-gun salute is fired.

As the inauguration has been held every 4 and now 6 years on 7 May, the anniversary of the raising of the Kremlin Regiment, the ceremony ends in Cathedral Square with both the outgoing and incoming presidents attending the latter's 1st inspection of the regiment as the Supreme Commander-in-Chief of the Russian Armed Forces, greeting it on its anniversary. It is then followed by the marchpart of the entire regiment assembled.

== Oath ==
Russian national anthem at Medvedev inauguration, 2008

The Patrioticheskaya Pesnya at the inauguration of Vladimir Putin, 2000.

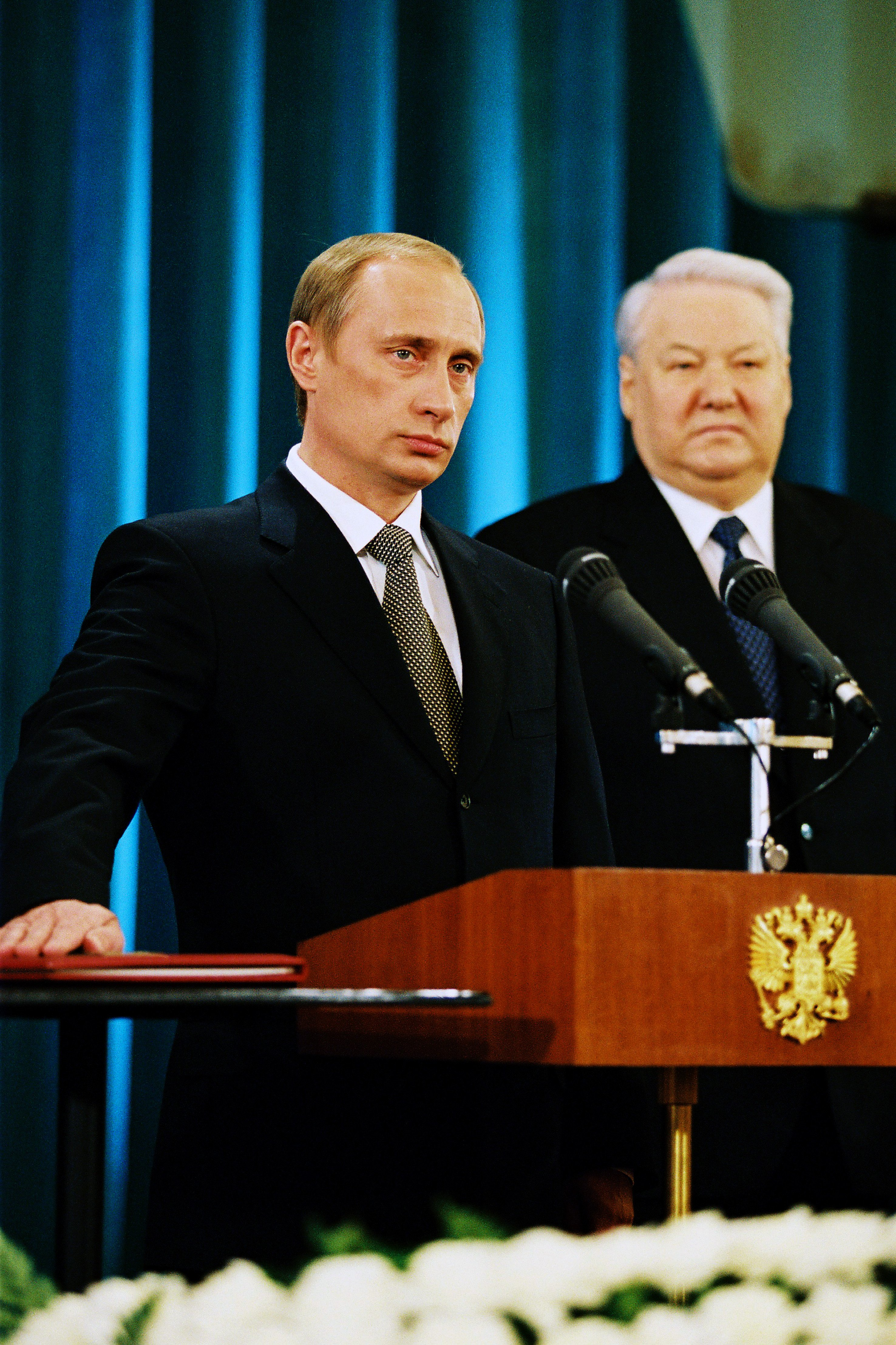
Vladimir Putin taking the Presidential Oath, May 7, 2000.

In Russian: Клянусь при осуществлении полномочий Президента Российской Федерации уважать и охранять права и свободы человека и гражданина, соблюдать и защищать Конституцию Российской Федерации, защищать суверенитет и независимость, безопасность и целостность государства, верно служить народу.

In Russian (transliteration): Klyanus’ pri osushchestvlenii polnomochiy Prezidenta Rossiyskoy Federatsii uvazhat’ i okhranyat’ prava i svobody cheloveka i grazhdanina, soblyudat’ i zashchishchat’ Konstitutsiyu Rossiyskoy Federatsii, zashchishchat’ suverenitet i nezavisimost’, bezopasnost’ i tselostnost’ gosudarstva, verno sluzhit’ narodu.

Translation: I swear in exercising the powers of the President of the Russian Federation to respect and protect the rights and freedoms of man and citizen, to respect and defend the Constitution of the Russian Federation, to protect the sovereignty and independence, security and integrity of the state, to faithfully serve the people.

At the same time Boris Yeltsin in 1991 and Alexander Rutskoy in 1993 was read another text of the oath:

In Russian: Клянусь при осуществлении полномочий президента Российской Советской Федеративной Социалистической Республики соблюдать Конституцию и законы РСФСР, защищать её суверенитет, уважать и охранять права и свободы человека и гражданина, права народов РСФСР и добросовестно исполнять возложенные на меня народом обязанности.

In Russian (transliteration): Klyanus’ pri osushchestvlenii polnomochiy prezidenta Rossiyskoy Sovetskoy Federativnoy Sotsialisticheskoy Respubliki soblyudat’ Konstitutsiyu i zakony RSFSR, zashchishchat’ eyë suverenitet, uvazhat’ i okhranyat’ prava i svobody cheloveka i grazhdanina, prava narodov RSFSR i dobrosovestno ispolnyat’ vozlozhennyye na menya narodom obyazannosti.

Translation: I swear in exercising the powers of President of the Russian Soviet Federative Socialist Republic to observe the Constitution and laws of the RSFSR, to protect its sovereignty, respect and protect the rights and freedoms of man and citizen and the rights of peoples of the RSFSR and conscientiously fulfill the duties entrusted to me by the people.

== List of inaugural ceremonies ==
No.	Date	Event	Location	Oath administered by
1st	July 10, 1991 (Wednesday)	First inauguration of Boris Yeltsin	Hall of the Kremlin Palace of Congresses; Moscow Kremlin; Moscow	Ruslan Khasbulatov, Chairman of the Supreme Soviet
2nd	August 9, 1996 (Friday)	Second inauguration of Boris Yeltsin	Hall of the State Kremlin Palace; Moscow Kremlin; Moscow	Vladimir Tumanov, President of the Constitutional Court
3rd	May 7, 2000 (Sunday)	First inauguration of Vladimir Putin	Hall of the Order of St. Andrew; Grand Kremlin Palace; Moscow Kremlin; Moscow	Marat Baglai, President of the Constitutional Court
4th	May 7, 2004 (Friday)	Second inauguration of Vladimir Putin	Hall of the Order of St. Andrew; Grand Kremlin Palace; Moscow Kremlin; Moscow	Valery Zorkin, President of the Constitutional Court
5th	May 7, 2008 (Wednesday)	Inauguration of Dmitry Medvedev	Hall of the Order of St. Andrew; Grand Kremlin Palace; Moscow Kremlin; Moscow	Valery Zorkin, President of the Constitutional Court
6th	May 7, 2012 (Monday)	Third inauguration of Vladimir Putin	Hall of the Order of St. Andrew; Grand Kremlin Palace; Moscow Kremlin; Moscow	Valery Zorkin, President of the Constitutional Court
7th	May 7, 2018 (Monday)	Fourth inauguration of Vladimir Putin	Hall of the Order of St. Andrew; Grand Kremlin Palace; Moscow Kremlin; Moscow	Valery Zorkin, President of the Constitutional Court
8th	May 7, 2024 (Tuesday)	Fifth inauguration of Vladimir Putin	Hall of the Order of St. Andrew; Grand Kremlin Palace; Moscow Kremlin; Moscow	Valery Zorkin, President of the Constitutional Court

== See also ==
- United States presidential inauguration
