= Fifth inauguration of Vladimir Putin =

2024 inauguration

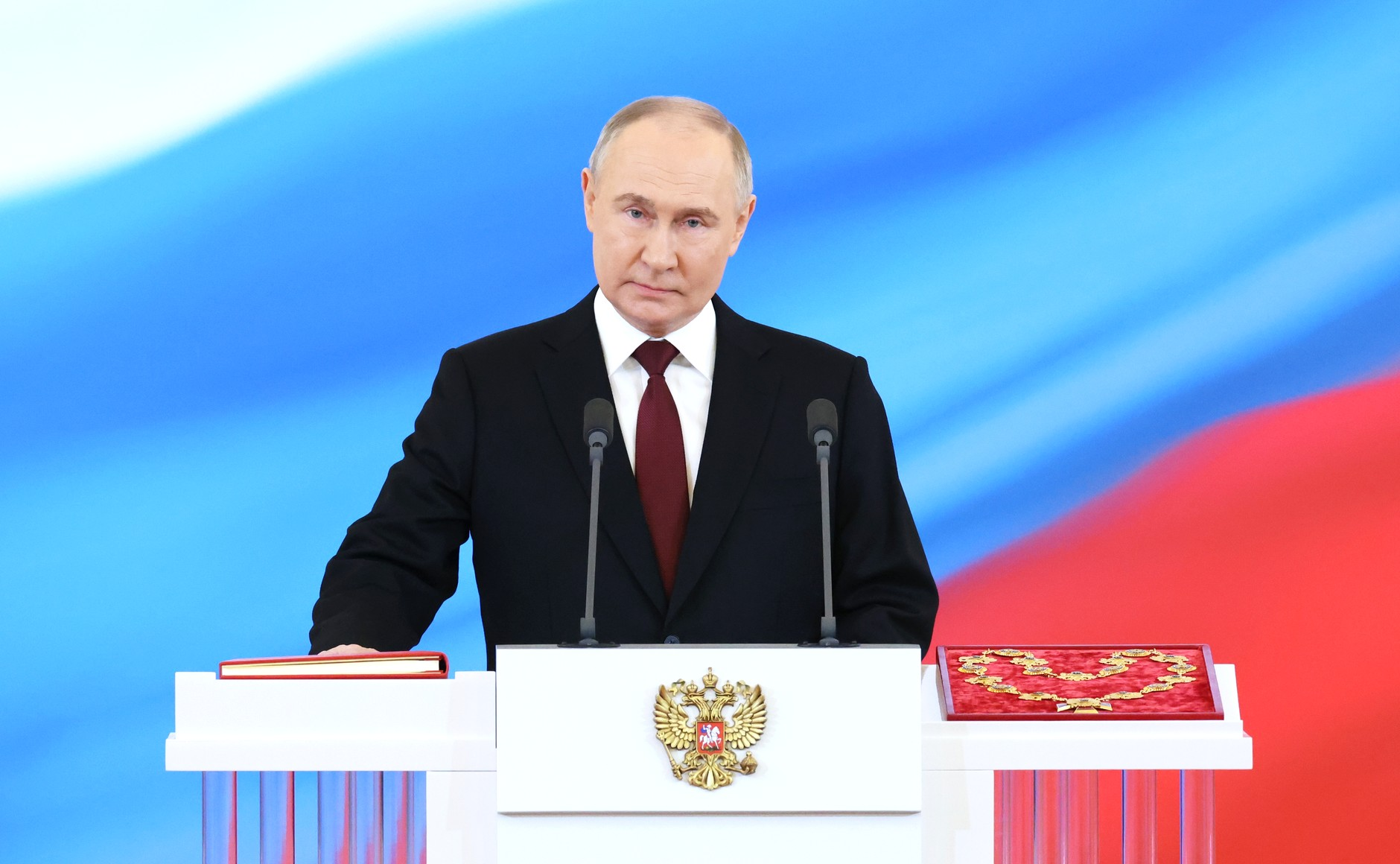
- Vladimir Putin takes the oath of office as the President of Russia.
- Date: 7 May 2024; 2 years ago
- Time: 12:00 (MSK)
- Venue: Grand Kremlin Palace
- Location: Moscow, Russia
- Participants: President of Russia, Vladimir Putin Assuming office President of the Constitutional Court of Russia, Valery Zorkin Administering oath

The fifth inauguration of Vladimir Putin as President of Russia took place on Tuesday, 7 May 2024, after Putin was declared the winner of the 2024 Russian presidential election.

Amid the ongoing Russian invasion of Ukraine and reports of electoral fraud, several countries refused to send representatives to the inauguration ceremony. This was the first full term after the 2020 amendments to the Constitution of Russia which established a hard two-term limit and reset Putin's prior term count.

== Background ==
Vladimir Putin has served as President of the Russian Federation continuously since 2012, having previously served between 2000 and 2008, after which the position was held by Dmitry Medvedev.

According to official data, in the 2024 presidential election, Putin won with 87.28% of the votes in the first round.

== Inauguration ==
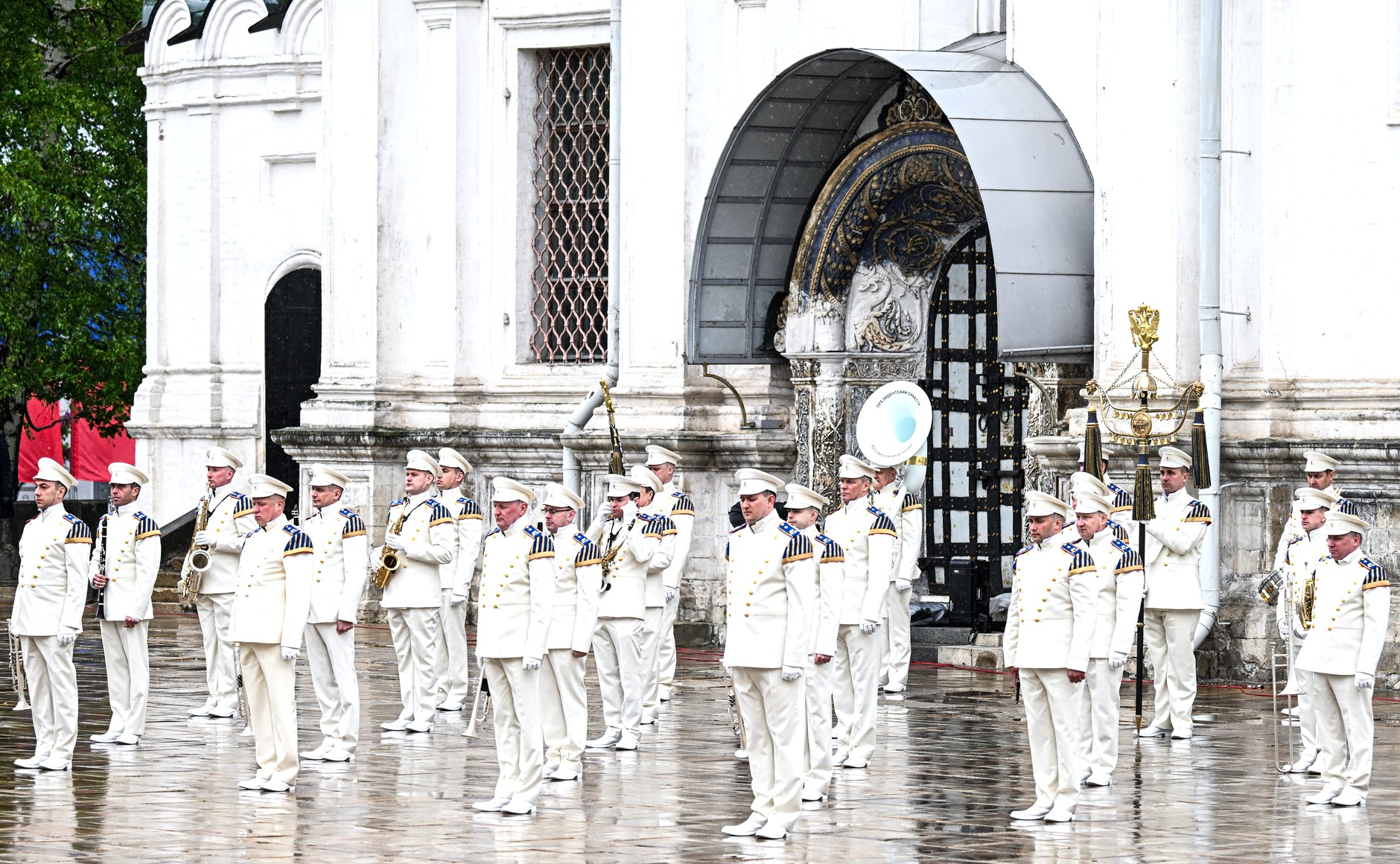
Members of the Kremlin Regiment during the inauguration

At noon, Putin proceeded to the Hall of the Order of St. Andrew in the Grand Kremlin Palace, where he took the oath of allegiance to the Constitution. Before arriving for the inauguration, Putin was first shown sitting at a desk in his office in the Kremlin, then walking through the corridors. Afterwards, he went to the venue in a restyled Aurus Senat, as he did in the previous inauguration in 2018; however, this time he was accompanied by electric motorcycles of the same brand.

After taking the oath, Putin made an address to the citizens, and then, according to tradition, received the parade of the presidential regiment on the Kremlin's Cathedral Square, and attended an Orthodox prayer service at the Cathedral of the Annunciation.

Following the inauguration, the government of Prime Minister Mikhail Mishustin resigned as per constitutional convention. Putin reappointed Mishustin to form a second cabinet on 10 May, which was later overwhelmingly confirmed by the State Duma.

== Guests ==
There were a total of 2,600 attendees at the event, including members of the government, the presidential administration, deputies of both chambers of the Federal Assembly, judges of the Constitutional Court and members of the Central Election Commission. They included members of Putin's entourage, such as former president Dmitry Medvedev, head of Chechnya Ramzan Kadyrov, the CEO of Channel One Russia, Konstantin Ernst, and American actor Steven Seagal. Standing on stage next to Putin were the president of the Constitutional Court, Valery Zorkin, and the speakers of the Federation Council and State Duma, respectively Valentina Matviyenko and Vyacheslav Volodin.

=== Foreign ===
On 6 May, Russian Presidential Aide Yuri Ushakov informed journalists during a press briefing that formal invitations had been extended to all foreign ambassadors based in Moscow for the upcoming inauguration ceremony. Russian Deputy Foreign Minister Sergei Ryabkov, speaking in an interview with Channel One, described the decision to invite ambassadors from unfriendly countries as a complex one, yet emphasized that it served as a clear signal from Moscow to these states. Ryabkov remarked that the conduct of states that declined to send their diplomats is deemed as "cheap." Envoys from six European Union member states were confirmed at the inauguration, including representatives of Hungary and Slovakia, and the ambassadors of France, Greece, Malta and Cyprus. Also attending were ambassadors Simona Halperin of Israel, Robert Kvile of Norway, and Lee Do-hoon of South Korea.

=== Declined ===
Armenia's Prime Minister Nikol Pashinyan said that he did not receive an invitation from Putin. Lithuanian Foreign Minister Gabrielius Landsbergis said, "We believe that the isolation of Russia, especially its criminal leader, must continue... Participation in Putin's inauguration is unacceptable for Lithuania. Our priority remains supporting Ukraine and its people who are fighting against Russian aggression." United States State Department spokesman Matthew Miller said that the US would not be sending a representative to the inauguration, but in regard to whether Putin was being considered an illegitimate president, added that "the elections weren't fair, but he still presides in Russia." The European Union said it would not be sending its ambassador to attend the inauguration.

Other countries which did not attend included Austria, Belgium, Canada, the Czech Republic, Estonia, Finland, Germany, Japan, Latvia, Poland, Sweden, and the United Kingdom.

== Reactions ==
Bahrain, Brunei, China, Nicaragua, North Korea, Syria, the United Arab Emirates, and Yemen conveyed formal messages of congratulations to Vladimir Putin on his inauguration as President of Russia.

Yulia Navalnaya, the widow of Russian opposition leader Alexei Navalny, who died in prison in February, described Putin as "a liar, a thief and a murderer" and urged her supporters "to keep up the fight against Putin". Ukraine declared that it would not acknowledge Putin as the president of Russia.
