= Inauguration of Boris Yeltsin =

Inauguration of Boris Yeltsin may refer to:

- First inauguration of Boris Yeltsin, 1991
- Second inauguration of Boris Yeltsin, 1996
