= List of leaders of Russia =

List of leaders of Russia may refer to:

- List of heads of government of Russia
- List of heads of state of Russia
- List of leaders of the Soviet Union
- List of presidents of Russia
- List of Russian monarchs
- Premier of the Soviet Union
