= Festival Coronation March =

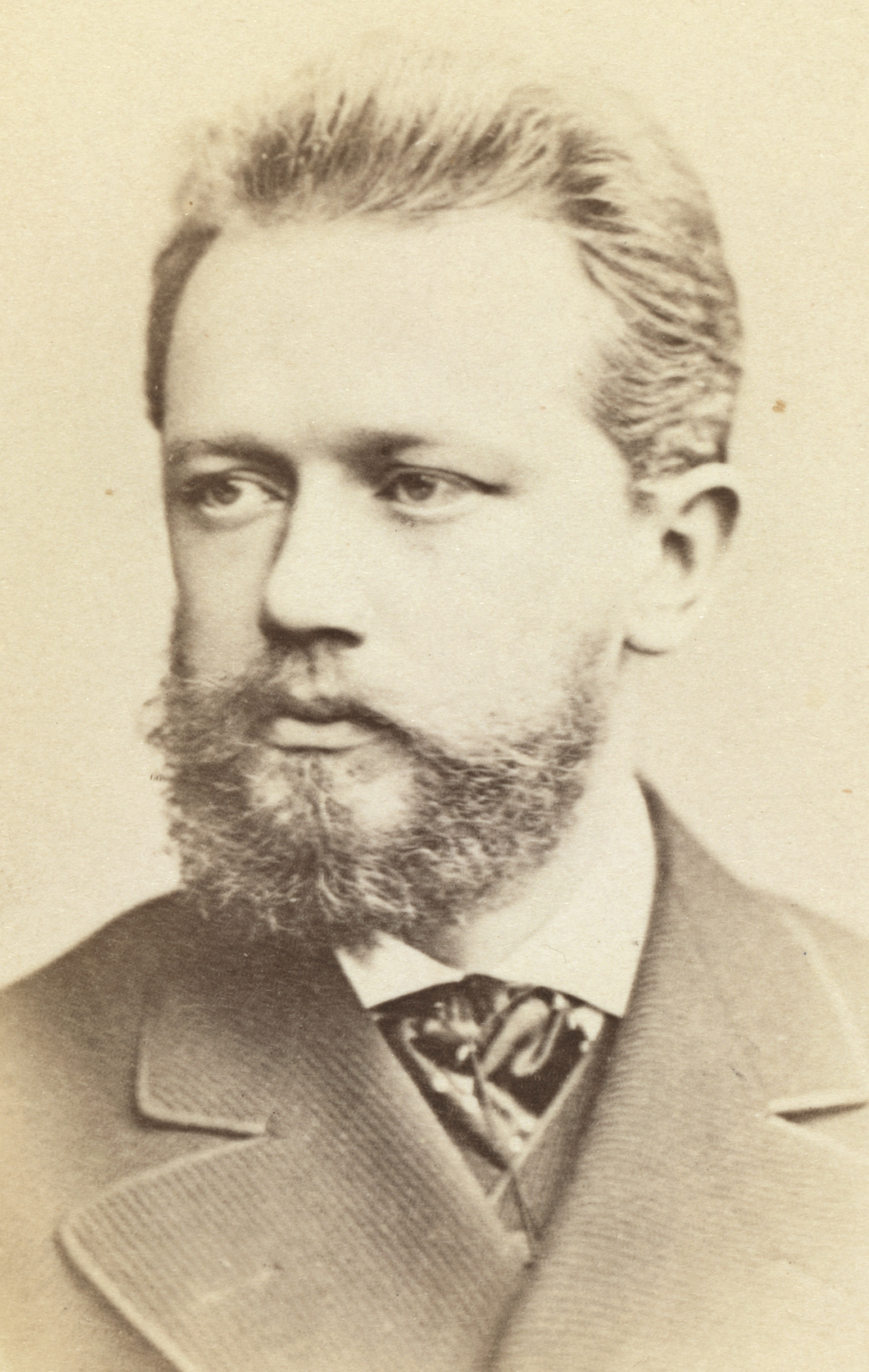
Pyotr Ilyich Tchaikovsky, c. 1880

The Festival Coronation March in D major, TH 50, ČW 47, is an orchestral work by Peter Ilyich Tchaikovsky ordered by the city of Moscow for the coronation of Tsar Alexander III in 1883. It was written during March 1883 and performed for the first time on June 4 [O.S. May 23], 1883 in Sokolniki Park (Moscow), conducted by Sergei Taneyev. The music included excerpts of the anthem God Save the Tsar. Recordings of this piece generally run between 5 and 5 1/2 minutes.

== First performances ==
The Saint Petersburg premiere was on January 10, 1885 [O.S. December 29, 1884], conducted by Hans von Bülow. The American premiere was on May 5, 1891, for the opening concert of Carnegie Hall, conducted by Tchaikovsky himself. The British premiere was on October 2, 1895, during the Promenade Concerts, conducted by Henry Wood.

== Modern revisions ==
During the Soviet Era, Russian performances and recordings of the music were revised to omit the excerpts from the Czarist national anthem, replacing it with thematic material used earlier in the march. Other works that quoted or otherwise used the anthem, such as Tchaikovsky's Marche Slave and 1812 Overture, were also revised, due to an official Soviet ban on the anthem.

Starting with Dmitri Medvedev’s inauguration in 2008, an abbreviated version of this piece is played during the Russian presidential inauguration accompanying the entrance of the incoming president. This version lasts less than two minutes, and so ends well before the playing in this piece of the Tsarist anthem God Save the Tsar. Unlike Tchaikovsky’s other major compositions, the Coronation March does not have an opus number. It has been given the alternative catalogue designations TH 50 and ČW 47.
