= Second inauguration of Boris Yeltsin =

1996 inauguration

1996 presidential inauguration of Boris Yeltsin
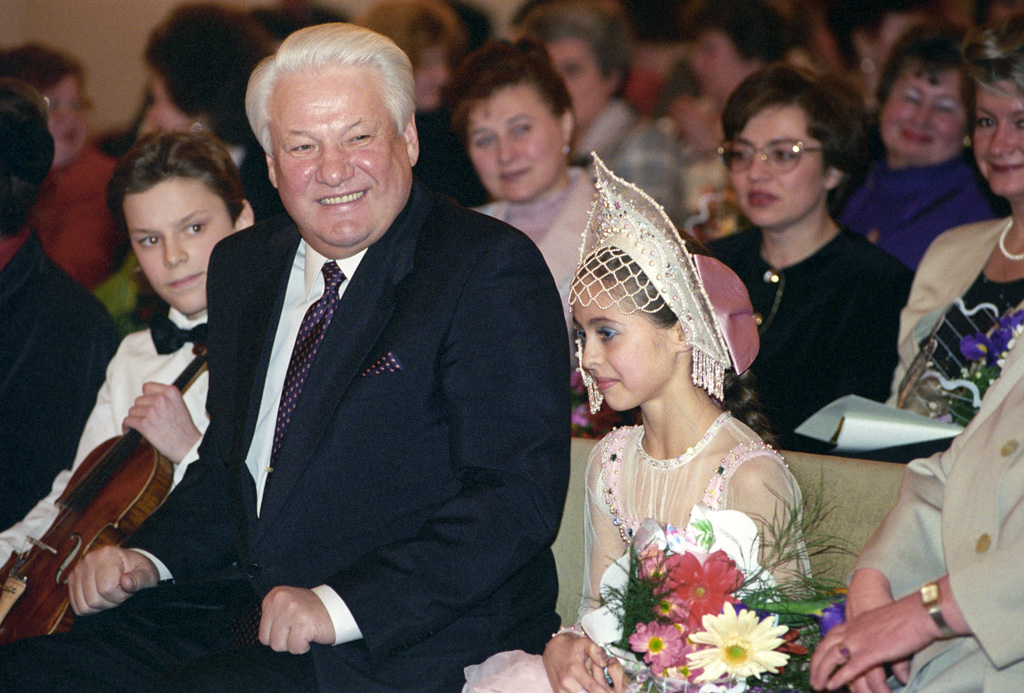
- Boris Yeltsin in 1996
- Date: 9 August 1996; 29 years ago
- Location: State Kremlin Palace Moscow
- Participants: President of Russia, Boris Yeltsin Assuming office President of the Constitutional Court of Russia, Vladimir Tumanov Administering oath

The second inauguration of Boris Yeltsin as the president of Russia took place on Friday, 9 August 1996. The ceremony was held at the State Kremlin Palace and lasted about thirty minutes.

It was originally planned to hold a ceremony at the Cathedral Square of the Moscow Kremlin, but in order to save money this idea was abandoned.

== Background ==
Boris Yeltsin won the election in 1996 and re-entered the office of the president of Russia a month later.

== Ceremony ==
First, in the inauguration of the Hall have been brought standard of the president of Russia, flag of Russia, Russian Constitution and sign of the president of Russia.

Next on stage were invited the President of the Constitutional Court of Russia Vladimir Tumanov, Prime Minister Viktor Chernomyrdin, Chairman of the Federation Council Yegor Stroyev, Chairman of the State Duma Gennady Seleznyov, Chairman of the Central Election Commission of the Russian Federation Nikolay Ryabov and Patriarch of Moscow and All Russia Alexy II.

After the twelfth stroke Kremlin chimes, President Boris Yeltsin entered the hall.

The first speech was made by the Chairman of the Central Election Commission of Russia Nikolai Ryabov, in his speech he congratulated Boris Yeltsin, announced that Yeltsin was popularly re-elected President of Russia for a second term and he declared that the elections were fair and democratic. At the end of the speech Ryabov gave Yeltsin a certificate of the Russian President.

Then, a speech made by the President of the Constitutional Court Vladimir Tumanov, who also congratulated Yeltsin announced electoral integrity and urged the President took the oath.

After Boris Yeltsin took the oath, he sounded Anthem of Russia, and a copy of the standard of the president of Russia was raised over the Kremlin Senate.

Thereafter, Chairman of the Federation Council Yegor Stroyev, put on the symbol of Presidential power on Boris Yeltsin.

Then, with a made a congratulatory speech, Patriarch Alexy II.

At the end of the ceremony it was made of thirty artillery salute volleys.
