= Vladimir Tumanov =

2nd President of the Constitutional Court of Russia (1926-2011)

- Владимир Туманов
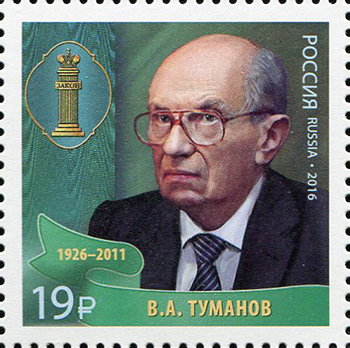
- Tumanov on a 2016 Russian post stamp

Judge of the European Court of Human Rights in respect of Russia
- In office 23 April 1997 – 1 November 1998
- Preceded by: Office established
- Succeeded by: Anatoly Kovler

2nd President of the Constitutional Court of Russia
- In office 13 February 1995 – 20 February 1997
- Nominated by: Boris Yeltsin
- Preceded by: Valery Zorkin; Nikolay Vitruk (acting)
- Succeeded by: Marat Baglai

Judge of the Constitutional Court of Russia
- In office 25 October 1994 – 11 June 1997
- Nominated by: Boris Yeltsin

Personal details
- Born: 20 October 1926 Kropotkin, North Caucasus Krai, Russian SFSR, USSR
- Died: 9 June 2011 (aged 84) Moscow, Russia
- Party: Communist Party of the Soviet Union; Party of Russian Unity and Accord
- Education: Institute of Foreign Trade

Vladimir Alexandrovich Tumanov (Russian: Владимир Александрович Туманов; 20 October 1926 – 9 June 2011) was a Soviet and Russian legal scholar who served as 2nd President of the Constitutional Court of Russia from 1995 to 1997.

== Biography ==
Vladimir Alexandrovich Tumanov was born in a town of Kropotkin in North Caucasus Krai (now Krasnodar Krai) on October 20, 1926. He graduated from the law faculty of the Institute of Foreign Trade under the Ministry of Foreign Trade (now MGIMO) in 1948. From 1948 to 1959, he worked as a lawyer for the Intourist tour operator. In 1959, he started his academic career at the Institute of State and Law of the Academy of Sciences of the Soviet Union (later Russian Academy of Sciences). He received his doctoral degree in juridical sciences in 1969 by defending a thesis "Bourgeois Legal Ideology: a Critique of the Teachings of Law".

In December 1993, Tumanov became a deputy of the 1st State Duma (Party of Russian Unity and Accord), where he joined the Committee for Legislation and Judicial Reform. A year later, Tumanov was appointed judge of the Constitutional Court of Russia, so he stepped down as MP.

In 1995 Vladimir Tumanov was elected President of the Constitutional Court of Russia. As the President of the Constitutional Court, he administered oath of President Boris Yeltsin during his inauguration in 1996. In February 1997, Tumanov resigned as court president due to the attainment of the maximum age, but kept office of the ordinary judge.

In April 1997 he was appointed judge of the European Court of Human Rights during the PACE session. On 1 November 1998, he resigned from his position as a judge of the ECHR due to the reorganization process.

== Awards ==
- Russian Federation Presidential Certificate of Honour
- Honoured Lawyer of Russia (2007)
- Order "For Merit to the Fatherland", III class (1996)
- Order of the Badge of Honour
