= President of the Constitutional Court of Russia =

President of the Constitutional Court of Federation of Russia
- Coat of Arms of Russia

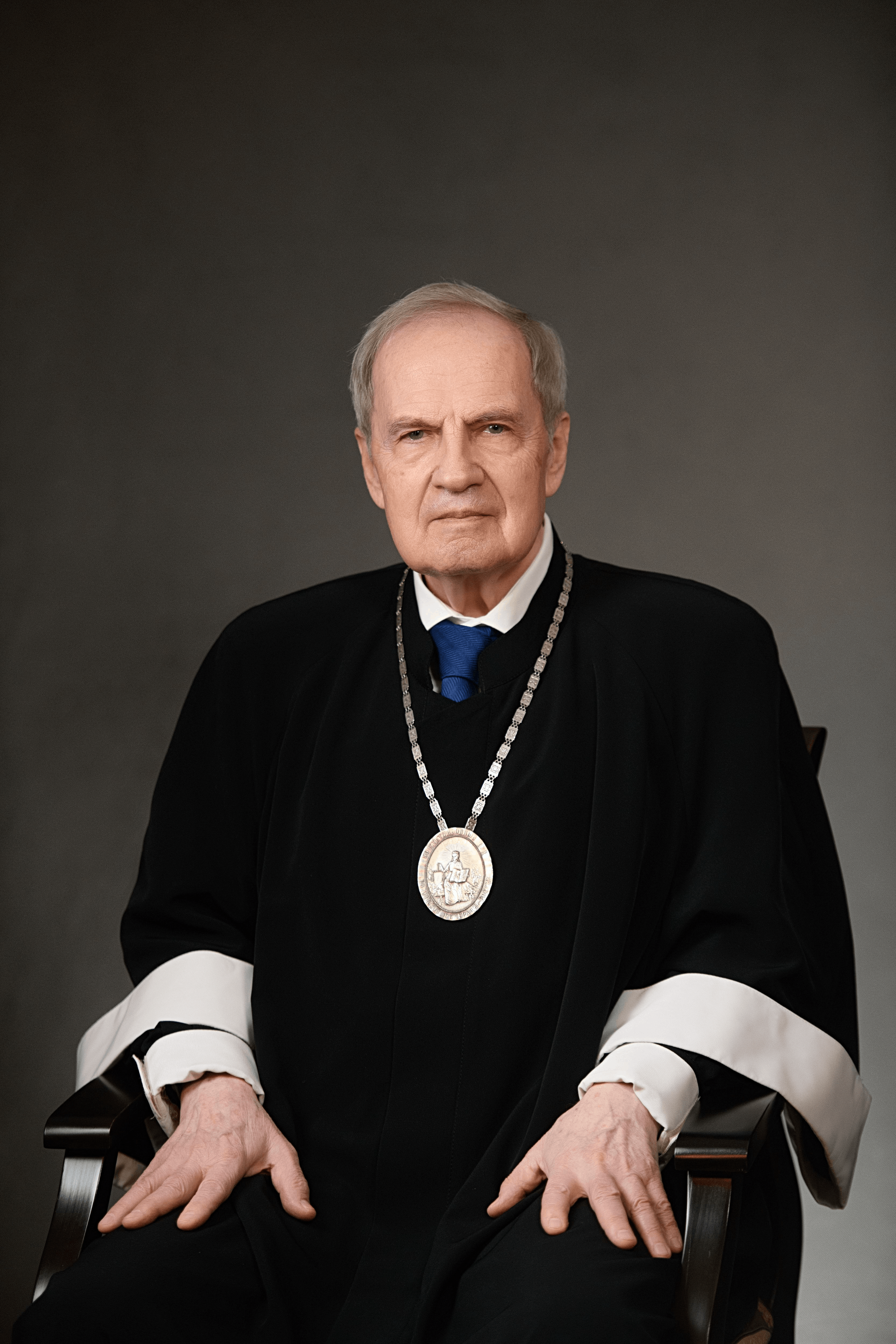
- Incumbent; Valery Zorkin since 21 February 2003
- Constitutional Court of Russia
- Type: Presiding judge
- Member of: Judges of the Constitutional Court
- Seat: Saint Petersburg, Russia
- Nominator: President of Russia
- Appointer: Federation Council
- Term length: 6 years, without terms limits
- Constituting instrument: Constitution of Russia; Federal Constitutional Law "On the Constitutional Court of the Russian Federation"
- Formation: 29 October 1991
- First holder: Valery Zorkin
- Website: ksrf.ru

The President of the Constitutional Court of the Russian Federation (Russian: Председатель Конституционного Суда Российской Федерации), is the presiding judge of the Constitutional Court of Russia.

== Appointment ==
Initially, the President of the Constitutional Court was elected by the judges of the court for three years. However, in 2009, such elections were canceled and the President became appoint by the Federation Council. Also, until 2020, only a judge of the Constitutional Court could be appointed President of the Court. In 2020, this requirement was lifted.

Currently, the President of the Constitutional Court is nominated by the President of Russia and appointed by the Federation Council for a six years term, renewable.

After the expiration of his term of office, the President of the Constitutional Court may be re–appointed to his office. The maximum number of terms during which the President can hold office is not set.

The President of the Constitutional Court is not subject to the restriction that a person who has reached the age of 70 cannot be a judge.

== Powers ==
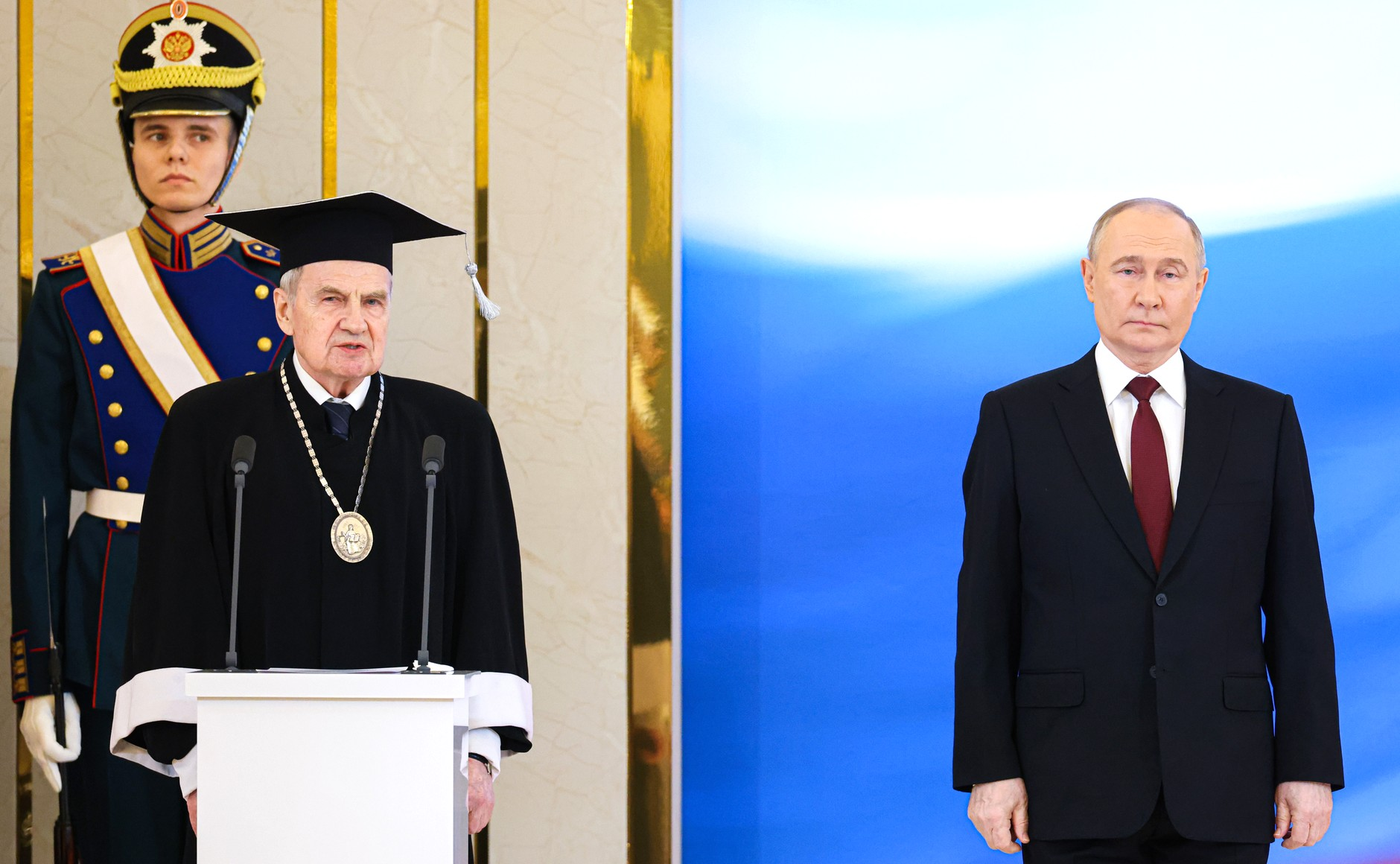
Valery Zorkin administering the oath of office during Vladimir Putin's fifth inauguration

In accordance with the article 24 of the Federal Constitutional Law "On the Constitutional Court of the Russian Federation", the President of the Constitutional Court has the following powers:

- overseeing preparation of the sessions of the Constitutional Court of the Russian Federation, convening them and presiding over them;
- submitting for the consideration of the Constitutional Court of the Russian Federation the questions to be considered at its sessions;
- represent the Constitutional Court of Russian Federation in relations with state bodies and organizations, social associations, and, under the authority of the Constitutional Court of Russian Federation, issuing statements on its behalf;
- performing general management of the staff of the Constitutional Court of the Russian Federation, submitting for the confirmation by the Constitutional Court of the Russian Federation candidates for head of the Apparatus and head of the Secretariat of the Constitutional Court of the Russian Federation as well as the Regulations of the Secretariat of the Constitutional Court of the Russian Federation and the structure of the staff;
- exercising other powers in accordance with the present Federal Constitutional Law and the Rules of the Constitutional Court of the Russian Federation.

The President of the Constitutional Court also administers the oath of office of the President of Russia, but this is more of a custom than a responsibility. The Constitution and other federal laws do not specify who should administer the oath, only that it should be taken by the President. During Boris Yeltsin's first inauguration in 1991, for example, the oath was administered by Ruslan Khasbulatov, the Chairman of the Presidium of the Supreme Soviet of Russia, as the Constitutional Court did not yet exist at that time.

== List ==
Denotes acting Presidents

President		Tenure	Tenure length	Alma mater	Previous service before court appointment	Ref.
1	Doctor of Juridical Science; Valery Zorkin (born 1943)	29 October 1991 – 6 October 1993	1 year, 342 days	Moscow State University	Professor of Constitutional Law at the Higher Correspondence School of Law of the Ministry of Internal Affairs (1986–1991)	
–	Doctor of Juridical Science; Nikolay Vitruk (1937–2012)	6 October 1993 – 13 February 1995	1 year, 130 days	Tomsk State University	Head of the Public Law Disciplines Department at the Higher Correspondence School of Law of the Ministry of Internal Affairs (1984–1991)	
2	Doctor of Juridical Science; Vladimir Tumanov (1926–2011)	13 February 1995 – 20 February 1997	2 years, 7 days	Institute of Foreign Trade	Member of the State Duma (first convocation) (1993–1994)	
3	Doctor of Juridical Science; Marat Baglai (1931–2024)	20 February 1997 – 21 February 2003	6 years, 1 day	Rostov State University	Professor of Constitutional Law at the Moscow State Institute of International Relations (1977–1995)	
4	Doctor of Juridical Science; Valery Zorkin (born 1943)	21 February 2003 – Incumbent	23 years, 223 days	Moscow State University	Professor of Constitutional Law at the Higher Correspondence School of Law of the Ministry of Internal Affairs (1986–1993)	

== Deputy Presidents ==
- Nikolay Vitruk (1991–1995)
- Tamara Morshchakova (1995–2002)
- Vladimir Strekozov (2002–2008)
- Olga Khokhryakova (2008–2019)
- Sergey Mavrin (2009–2025)
- Lyudmila Zharkova (2025–2026)
- Aleksandr Konovalov (since 2026)

== See also ==
- Chief Justice of the Russian Federation
- List of judges of the Constitutional Court of Russia
