= Cathedral Square, Moscow =

Central square of the Moscow Kremlin

Coordinates: 55°45′02″N 37°37′03″E

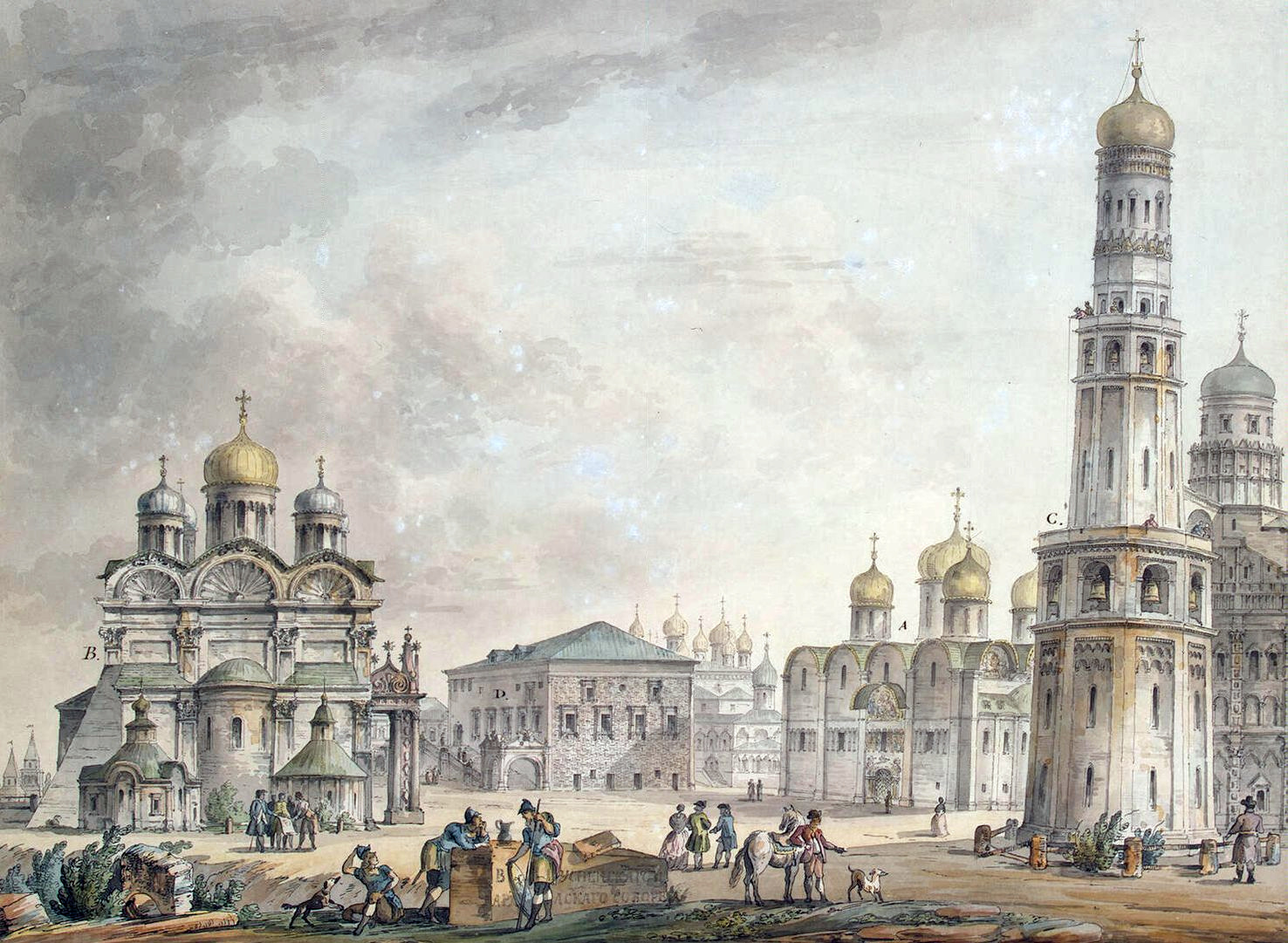
Cathedral Square in Moscow, a veduta by Quarenghi, 1797.

Cathedral Square or Sobornaya Square (Russian: Соборная площадь, romanized: Sobornaya ploshchad) is the central square of the Moscow Kremlin where all of its streets used to converge in the 15th century.

The square owes its name to the three cathedrals facing it – Cathedral of the Dormition, Cathedral of the Archangel, and Cathedral of the Annunciation. Apart from these, the Palace of Facets, the Church of the Deposition of the Robe and the Church of the Twelve Apostles are placed there. The tallest structure on the square (and formerly in all of Russia) is Ivan the Great Bell Tower, which also separates Sobornaya Square from Ivanovskaya Square.

Cathedral Square is famous as the site of solemn coronation and funeral processions of all the Russian tsars, patriarchs, and Grand Dukes of Moscow. Even today, the square is used in the inauguration ceremony of the President of Russia.

== Archaeological excavations ==
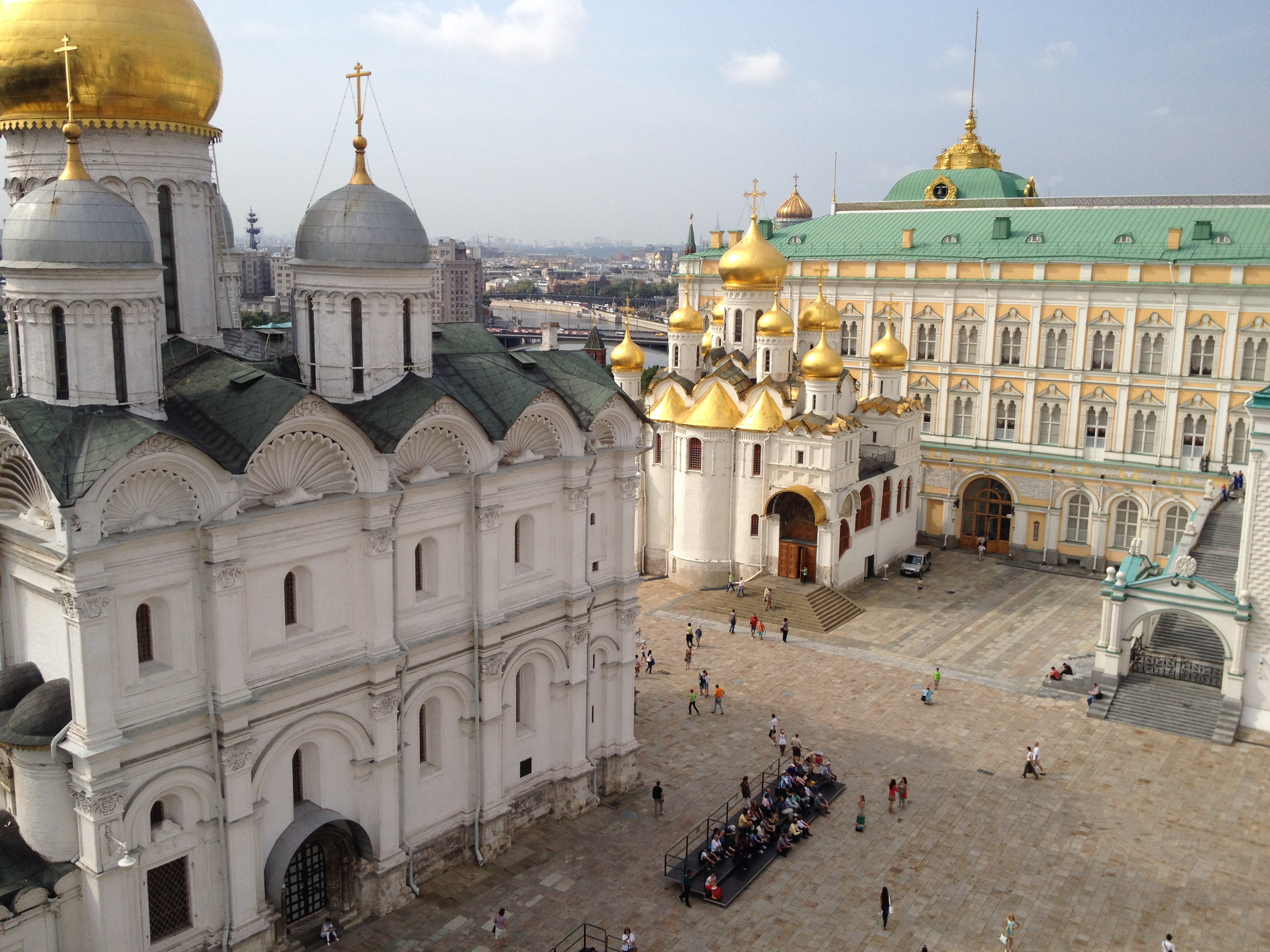
View from the Ivan the Great Bell Tower

The Moscow Kremlin, where the square is located, is a closed object for archaeologists because the state authorities are located there. The Kremlin cannot be called a sufficiently studied monument: before the revolution, no one was engaged in archaeological excavations because the territory was built up and monasteries were in operation. After the Revolution, the Kremlin continued to be a closed territory. The main source of archaeological materials was not excavations with the full opening of ancient structures, but observations and fixation of the cultural layer during economic and engineering works.

Nevertheless, archaeologists have managed to discover the first settlements on the territory of the Moscow Kremlin belonging to the Bronze Age (II millennium BC). A Finno-Ugric settlement of the early Iron Age (second half of the first millennium B.C.) was found near the modern Archangel Cathedral. At that time the population occupied the area of the modern Sobornaya Square.
