= Inauguration of Vladimir Putin =

Inauguration of Vladimir Putin may refer to:

- First inauguration of Vladimir Putin, 2000
- Second inauguration of Vladimir Putin, 2004
- Third inauguration of Vladimir Putin, 2012
- Fourth inauguration of Vladimir Putin, 2018
- Fifth inauguration of Vladimir Putin, 2024
