= Order of Friendship (disambiguation) =

The Order of Friendship is a state decoration of the Russian Federation.

Order of Friendship may also refer to:

- Dostlug Order or the Order of Friendship, of the Republic of Azerbaijan
- Order of Friendship (China)
- Order of Friendship (Kazakhstan), also known as the Order Dostyk
- Order of Friendship (North Korea)
- Order of Friendship (Uzbekistan)
- Order of Friendship (Tajikistan)
- Order of Friendship (Armenia)
- Order of Friendship of Peoples, of the Soviet Union
- Order of the Friendship of Peoples, of Belarus

== See also ==
- Friendship Award (China)
- Friendship Medal (Cuba)
- Friendship Order, of Vietnam
