= Second inauguration of Vladimir Putin =

2004 inauguration

2004 presidential inauguration of Vladimir Putin
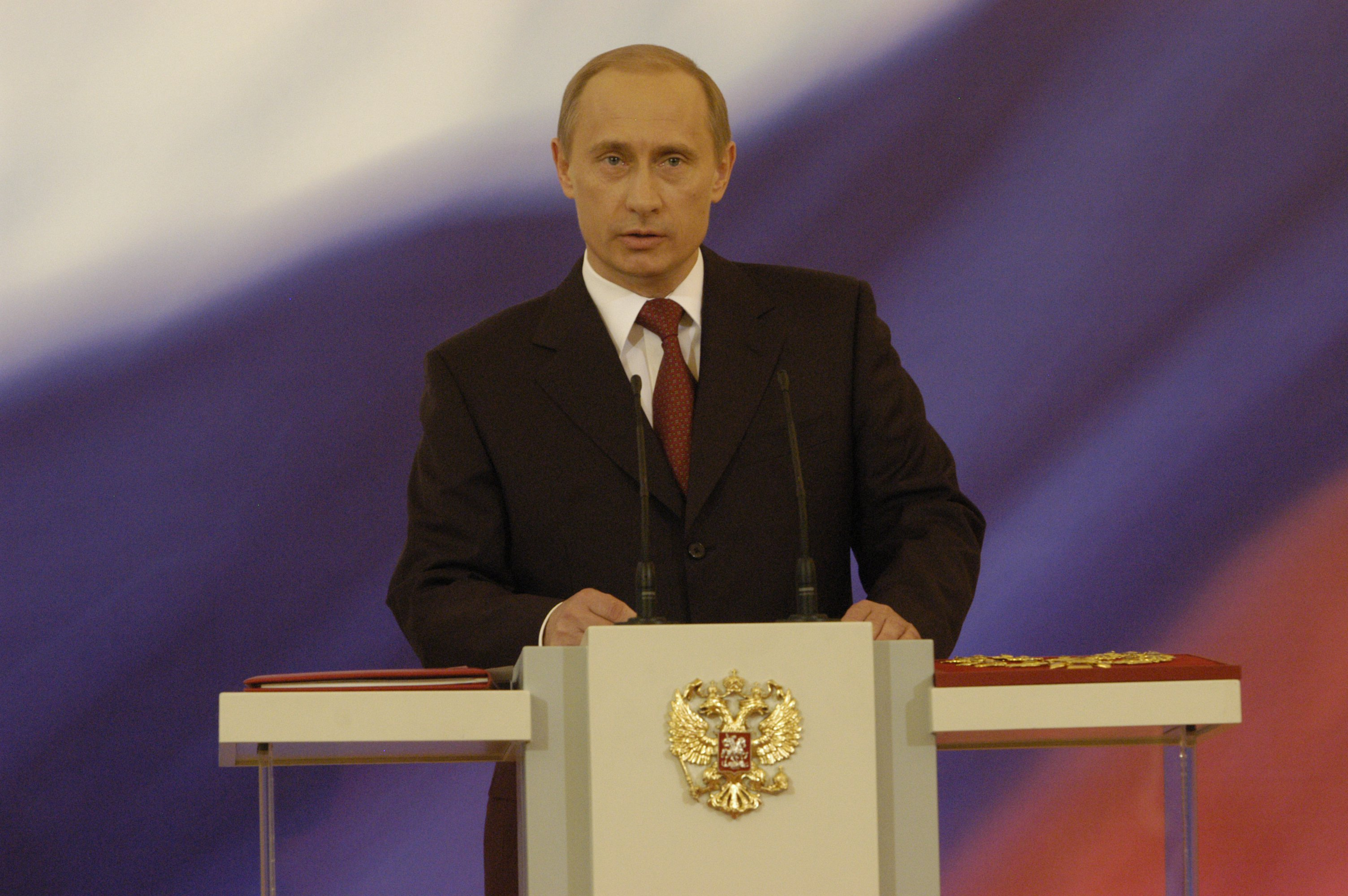
- Vladimir Putin takes the oath of office as the president of Russia.
- Date: 7 May 2004; 22 years ago
- Location: Grand Kremlin Palace, Moscow
- Participants: President of Russia, Vladimir Putin Assuming office President of the Constitutional Court of Russia, Valery Zorkin Administering oath

The second inauguration of Vladimir Putin as the president of Russia took place on Friday, 7 May 2004.

== Ceremony ==
The ceremony was held on the planned scenario and not much different from the previous one.

The countdown of the second four-year presidential term for Vladimir Putin began at noon. With the battle Kremlin chimes he entered the suite of three rooms (St. George's, Alexander's and St. Andrew's). After going through all three halls, the President rose to the podium, where he was met by the President of the Constitutional Court of Russia Valery Zorkin, Chairman of the Federation Council Sergey Mironov and Chairman of the State Duma Boris Gryzlov.

The ceremony was watched about 1,700 spectators. These were the ministers and governors, deputies and senators, foreign ambassadors and religious leaders, scientists and artists, representatives of Putin's campaign headquarters and journalists. Yeltsin's family at this time, at the inauguration ceremony represented the only wife of the first president of Russia. Chef Yeltsin protocol Vladimir Shevchenko said that "Boris Nikolayevich cold: he had an inflammation of the bronchi, and the doctors strongly advised him not to leave the house."

After taking the oath, he sounded Anthem of Russia and Vladimir Putin went to the door, simultaneously accepting congratulations spectators.

After that, on Ivanovskaya Square the review of troops took place.

== Inaugural address ==
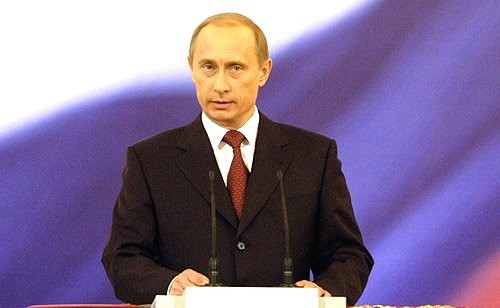
Vladimir Putin delivers a speech

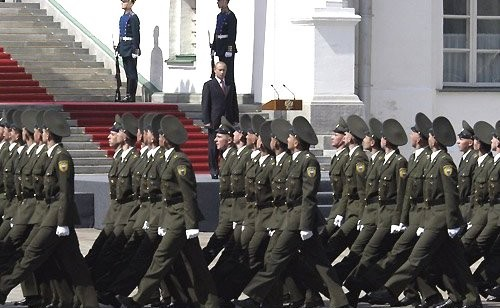
Vladimir Putin carried review troops

Vladimir Putin's speech:

Dear citizens of Russia! Dear friends!

Only that, in accordance with the Constitution, I have spoken the words of the presidential oath. Now I once again want to return to the main meaning of it and say, acting president to keep the state and to serve the people and will continue to be holy to me, and will continue to be for me above all else.

As before, we will proceed from the fact that the help and support of the Russian Federation citizens are the most important and most reliable support in the work of its president.

And today I would like to thank everyone who gave me great confidence and honor by electing to the post of head of the Russian state. All those who over the past four years brought its share of labor in the overall results of our country.

As in previous years, I will work actively, openly and honestly, I will do everything I can, everything in my power to meet the expectations of millions of people.

The past years were not easy for all of us. To be frank: they were a time of serious challenges. Then, in 2000, very many problems seemed unsolvable just.

But in critical situations the people of Russia showed its best patriotic and civil qualities. And when fighting for the territorial integrity and unity of the country. And when the hard work of creating the foundations for the growth of Russia's economic potential.

Together we were able to very much. And all this only reached themselves.

It was we who achieved high rates of development of our economy. We overcame a difficult ideological confrontation and now becoming gradually become a unified nation.

It was we who stopped the aggression of international terrorism. Rid the country of the real threat of disintegration.

This is what we have done with our Motherland an open country. Countries that are prepared to a wide, equitable cooperation with other countries. The country, strengthening its position in the international arena and knows how to peacefully defend their legitimate interests in the rapidly changing world.

Now the main goal of the next four years - to transform the experience we have the potential in the new energy development. It achieves this by fundamentally better quality of life for our people. To achieve real, tangible increase in their welfare.

We often repeat: in Russia, the head of state in charge and will be responsible for everything. This is still true. But today, deeply understanding the extent of their own personal responsibility, I want to emphasize that the success and prosperity of Russia can not and should not depend on one person or one political party, one political force. We must have a broad base of support in order to continue the reforms in the country.

I am convinced that the best guarantee of this continuity is a mature civil society.

Only free people in a free country can be really successful. This is the basis for economic growth and Russia, and its political stability.

And we will do everything so that everyone can show their talent and their abilities. To the country developed a real multi-party system, strengthened the personal freedom of citizens. To people in Russia can receive a good education, a decent social and medical assistance. That they were well off and could bequeath to the children of their own labor.

And, of course, we could be proud of the authority of a strong but peace-loving country.

Dear friends!

We have much, much to be done - and for the country and for ourselves and for our children. Now to achieve the goals we have all the possibilities. There are resources, their own experience, a thorough understanding of development priorities, based on past positive nearest the past four years. And there is a huge potential, tremendous energy and intellectual potential of our people.

We are with you - the heirs of the millennial Russian. Motherland outstanding sons and daughters: workers, soldiers, artists. They left us with you inherited a huge, great country.

Our past certainly gives us strength. But even the most glorious history in itself does not provide us with a better life. This greatness must be backed up.

Backed by new businesses present generations of citizens of our country.

Only then will our descendants will be proud of the pages that you and inscribe in the biography of the great Russian.

Thank you for attention.
