= Marat Baglai =

Russian jurist (1931–2024)

- Марат Баглай
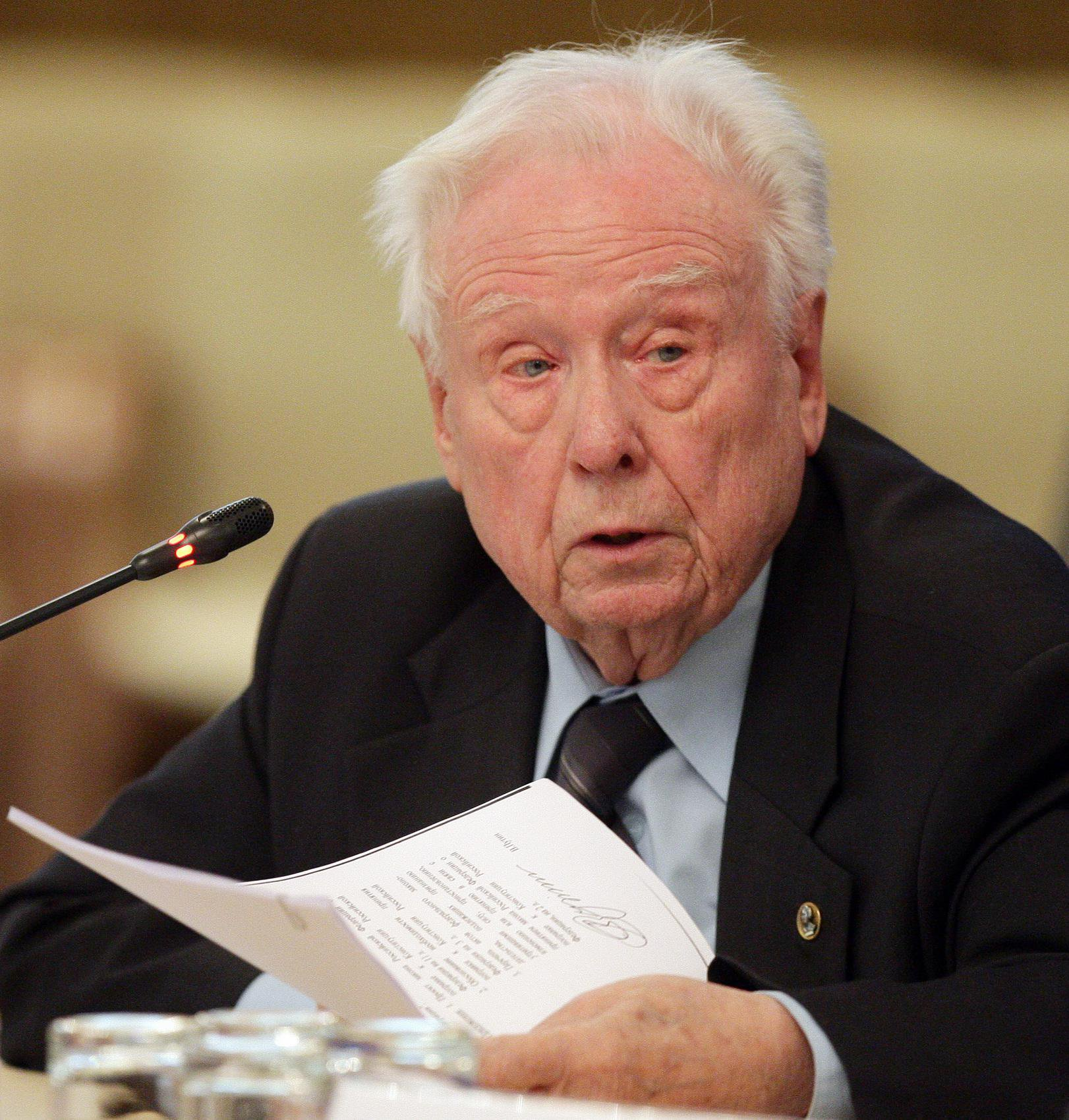
- Baglai in 2013

3rd President of the Constitutional Court of Russia
- In office 20 February 1997 – 21 February 2003
- Nominated by: Boris Yeltsin
- Preceded by: Vladimir Tumanov
- Succeeded by: Valery Zorkin

Judge of the Constitutional Court of Russia
- In office 7 February 1995 – 21 February 2003
- Nominated by: Boris Yeltsin

Personal details
- Born: Marat Viktorovich Baglai; 13 March 1931 Baku, Azerbaijan SSR, Transcaucasian SFSR, Soviet Union
- Died: 10 January 2024 (aged 92) Moscow, Russia
- Education: Rostov State University (Specialist); Institute of State and Law (Candidate of Sciences); Moscow State Institute of International Relations (Doctor of Sciences)

Marat Viktorovich Baglai (Russian: Мара́т Ви́кторович Багла́й; 13 March 1931 – 10 January 2024) was a Soviet and Russian scholar of constitutional law who served as 3rd President of the Constitutional Court of Russia from 1997 to 2003. He was corresponding member of Russian Academy of Sciences.

== Biography ==
=== Early life ===
Marat Viktorovich Baglai was born on 13 March 1931 in Baku. He graduated from the law faculty of Rostov State University in 1954.

In 1957 he graduated from the graduate Institute of State and Law of the Academy of Sciences of the USSR and defended the dissertation on competition of a scientific degree of candidate of legal Sciences on the topic "Legal issues of the strike movement in the United States."

=== Career ===
From 1957 to 1962 Baglai worked as a researcher at the Institute of State and law of the Academy of Sciences. From 1962 to 1967 he was associate Professor of the Moscow State Institute of International Relations (MGIMO).

In 1967 he defended his thesis for the degree of doctor of law on the topic "Social activities of the imperialist state: (Political and legal aspects)".

In 1970 he received the title of Professor of constitutional law. From 1967 to 1977 he worked as head of the Department of the Institute of international labor movement of the USSR Academy of Sciences.

From 1977 to 1995 he was Vice-rector of the Higher School of Trade Union Movement. From 1977 to 1995 he also served as Professor of Constitutional Law at the Moscow State Institute of International Relations.

On 7 February 1995, Baglai was elected as judge of the Constitutional Court of Russia.

In later years, he was a Professor of MGIMO, where he lectured on Constitutional Law of Foreign Countries.

=== President of the Constitutional Court ===
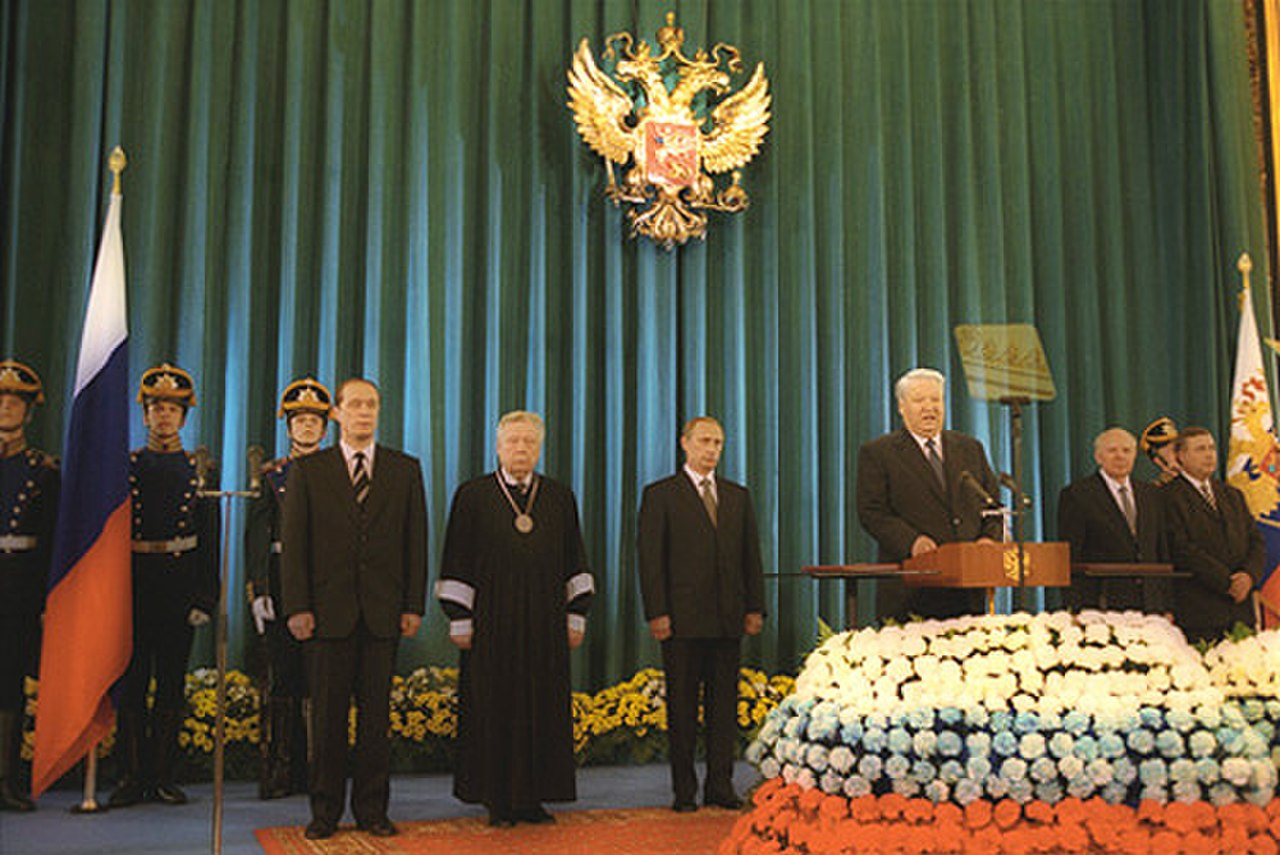
Marat Baglai (second from left) during the 2000 inauguration of Vladimir Putin

On 13 February 1995, Baglai was nominated for the post of President of the Constitutional Court for the first time, but lost the election to Vladimir Tumanov.

On 20 February 1997, he again ran for the President of the Constitutional Court. He was elected President of the Constitutional Court of the Russian Federation for a three-year term. On 21 February 2000, he was re-elected as President of the Constitutional Court of Russia.

On 7 May 2000, Vladimir Putin was administered the oath of office by Marat Baglai.

On 21 February 2003, Baglai's term expired and Valery Zorkin was elected the new President of the Constitutional Court. As Baglai was already over 70 years old, he also retired from the post of Judge of the Constitutional Court.

=== Death ===
Baglai died in Moscow on 10 January 2024, at the age of 92.

== Honours and awards ==
- Order of Merit for the Fatherland of 2nd class (11 March 2001) - for great personal contribution to strengthening of constitutional justice and long-term fruitful work;
- Order of Friendship of Peoples (1975);
- Honored worker of science of the Russian Federation (12 July 1996) - for merits in scientific activity;
- Honoured Lawyer of Russia (5 June 2003) - for his large contribution to strengthening the rule of law and many years of diligent work;
- Presidential Certificate of Honour (12 December 2008) - for active participation in preparation of the draft Constitution of the Russian Federation and his significant contribution to development of the democratic basis of the Russian Federation;
- Governmental Certificate of Honour (12 March 2001) - for meritorious activity on behalf of the state, long-term fruitful work and in connection with the 70th anniversary of his birth;
- Badge of the Central Election Commission of the Russian Federation (2008);
- Public order "Russian nation" (2009).
