= Valery Zorkin =

Russian judge (born 1943)

- Валерий Зорькин
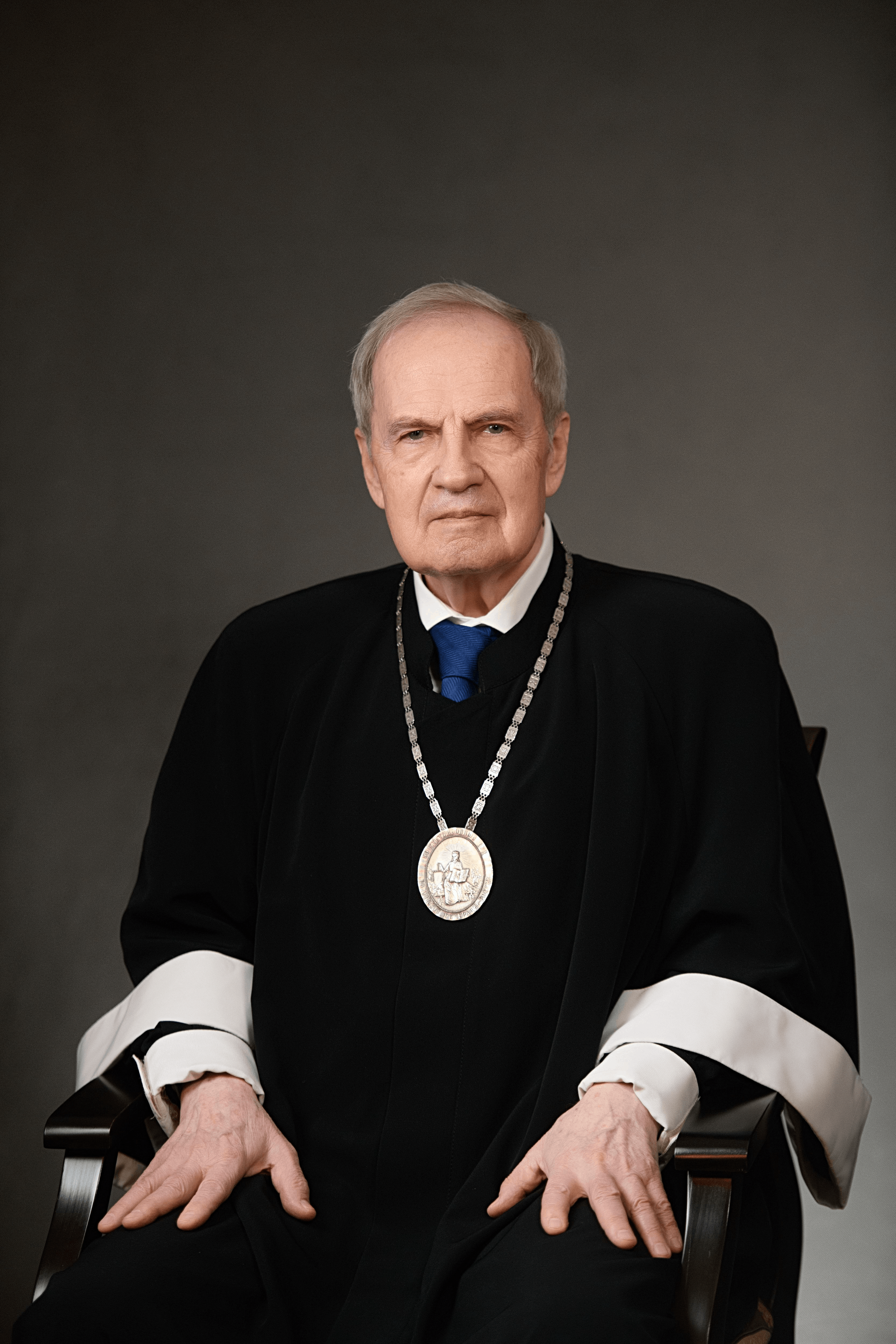
- Official portrait

President of the Constitutional Court of Russia
- Incumbent
- Assumed office 21 February 2003
- Nominated by: Vladimir Putin
- Deputy: Vladimir Strekozov; Olga Khokhryakova; Sergey Mavrin; Lyudmila Zharkova
- Preceded by: Marat Baglai
- In office 29 October 1991 – 6 October 1993
- Nominated by: Congress of People's Deputies of Russia
- Deputy: Nikolay Vitruk
- Preceded by: Office established
- Succeeded by: Nikolay Vitruk (acting); Vladimir Tumanov

Judge of the Constitutional Court of Russia
- Incumbent
- Assumed office 29 October 1991
- Nominated by: Congress of People's Deputies of Russia

Personal details
- Born: 18 February 1943 (age 83) Konstantinovka, Primorsky Krai, Soviet Union
- Party: Communist Party of the Soviet Union (1970–1991)
- Education: Moscow State University

Valery Dmitrievich Zorkin (Russian: Валерий Дмитриевич Зорькин; born 18 February 1943) is a Russian legal scholar and judge serving as the 4th and current President of the Constitutional Court of Russia. He also served as the 1st President of the Constitutional Court from 1991 to 1993.

As of 2026, Zorkin is the oldest high-ranking officeholder in Russia.

== Biography ==
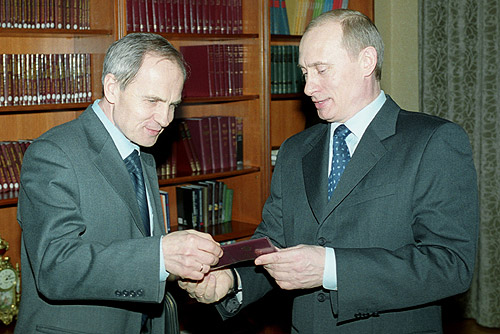
Zorkin and Putin, March 2003

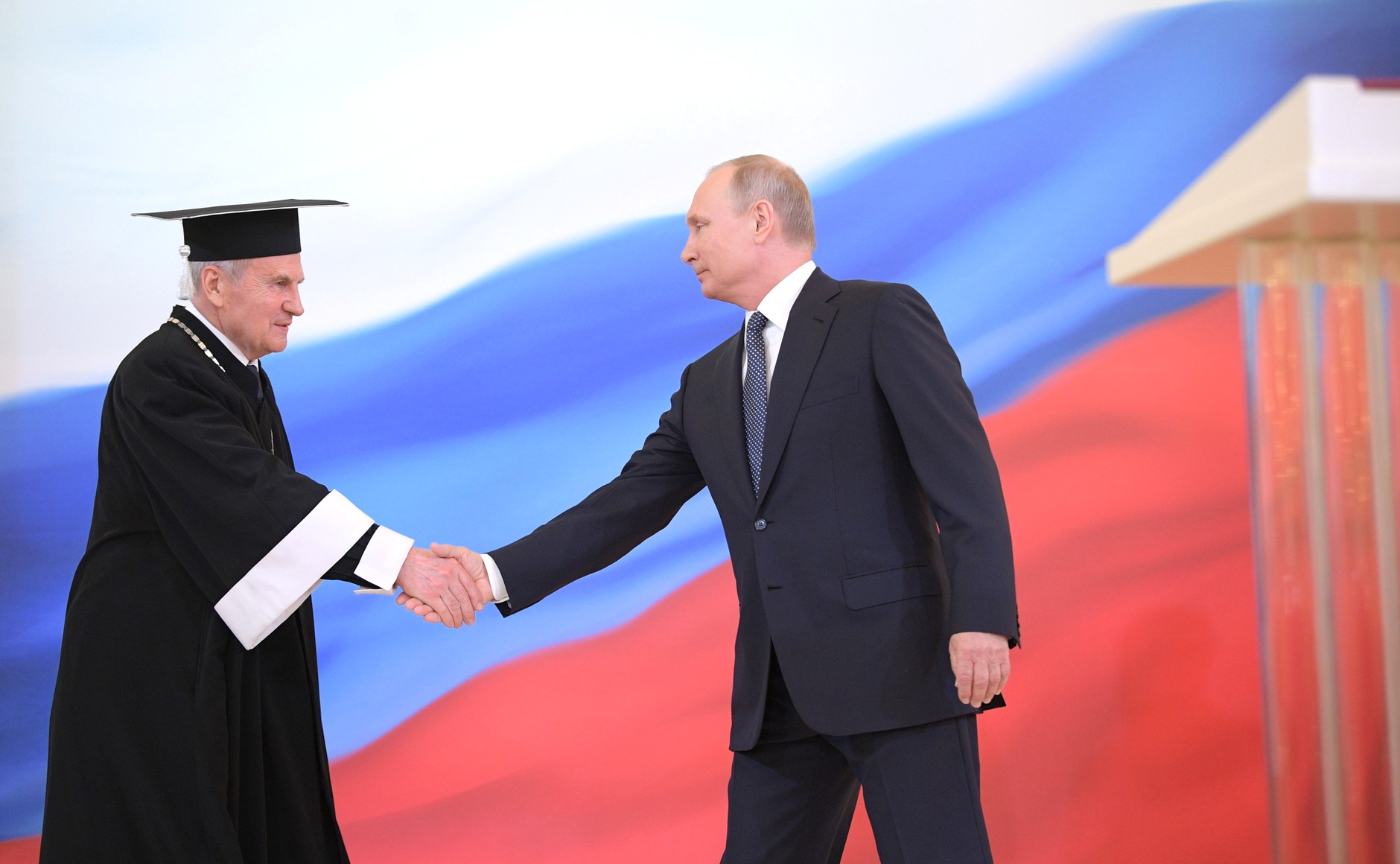
Zorkin after swearing Putin into office during his fourth inauguration ceremony, 7 May 2018

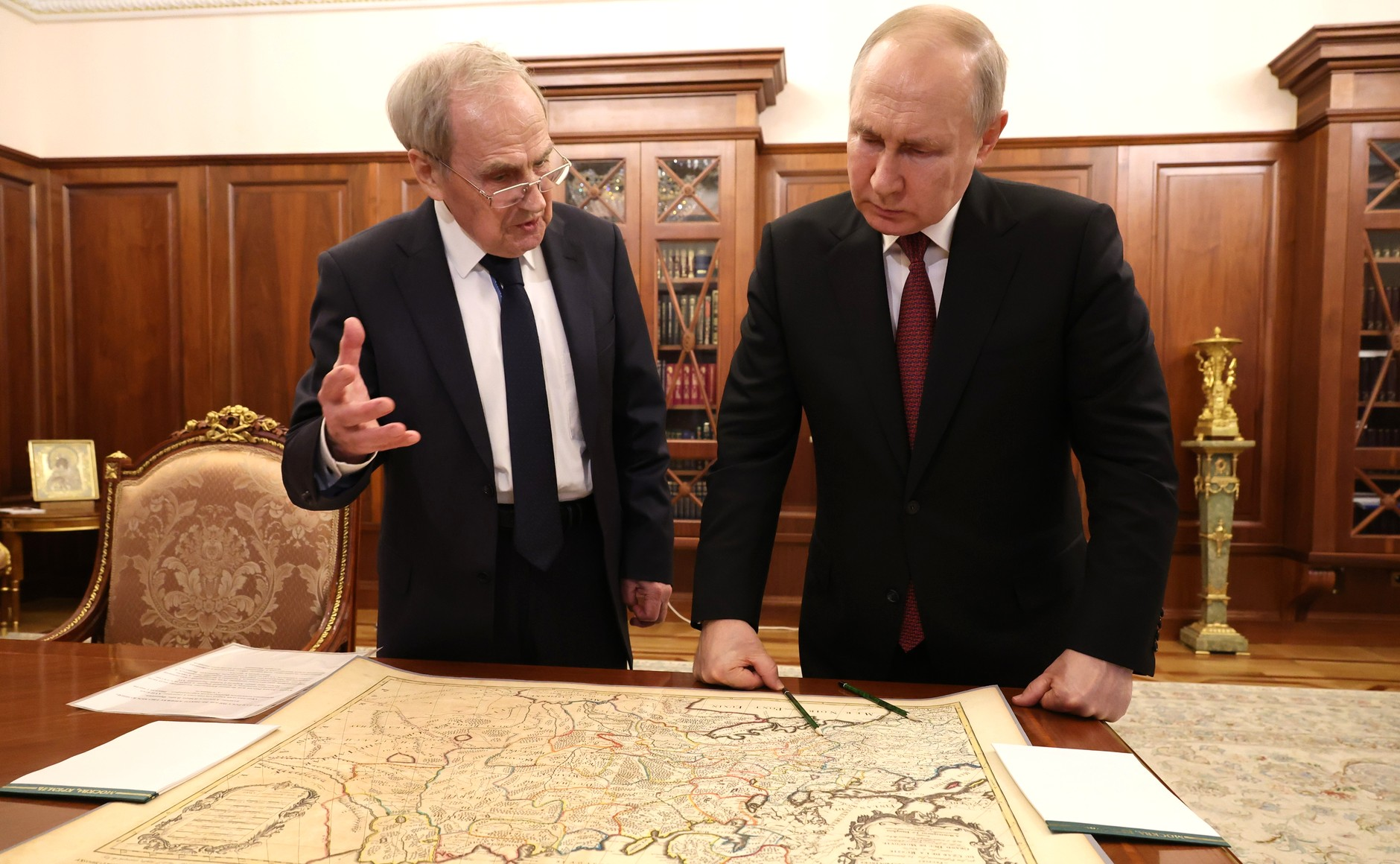
Zorkin and Putin in May 2023. Zorkin was showing a map of the 17th century made by the French. He exclaimed, "Why did I bring this? Mr President, there is no Ukraine here".

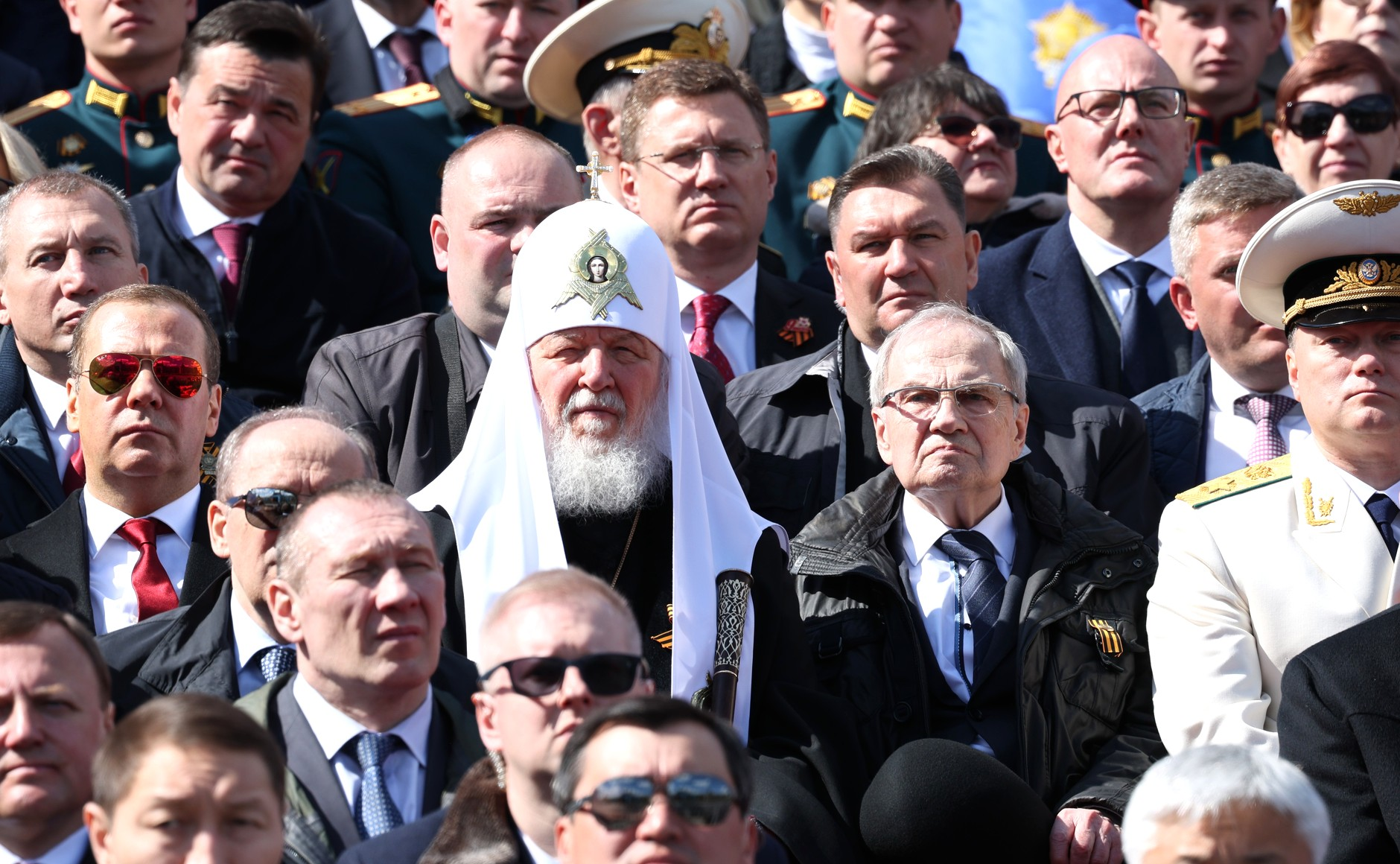
Zorkin, former President Dmitry Medvedev, Patriarch Kirill of Moscow, and Prosecutor General Igor Krasnov at the 2023 Moscow Victory Day Parade

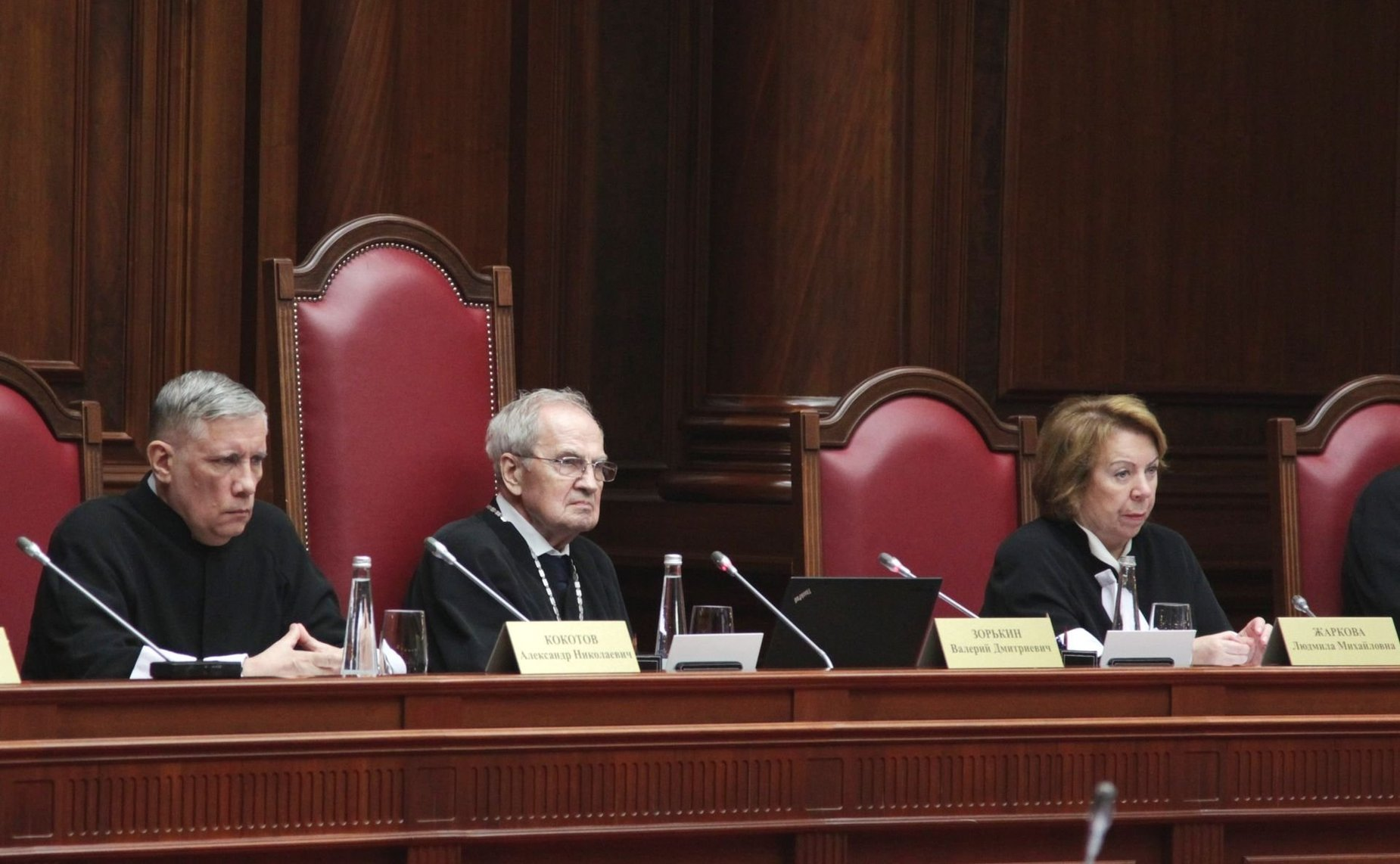
Zorkin presiding over a Constitutional Court session, 7 October 2025

Zorkin was born on February 18, 1943, in the village of Konstantinovka, in the Oktyabrsky District of the Primorsky Krai (Maritime Province). In 1964, he graduated with a law degree from the Moscow State University Faculty of Law, where he worked as a lecturer until the late 1980s. During this time, he also taught at the Higher Correspondence School of Law of the Ministry of Internal Affairs and became a professor. Zorkin was recognized as a leading expert on the legal teachings of Boris Chicherin and led a group of experts under the Soviet Constitutional Commission to further the case for Russia to become a presidential republic during the last years of the Soviet Union. After the August coup, Zorkin left the Communist Party of the Soviet Union.

In October 1991, Zorkin became a judge of the Constitutional Court of Russia. On November 1, he was elected the first (and only) President of the Court with unlimited tenure, and during the Russian constitutional crisis of 1992–1993, he and the Constitutional Court clashed with President Boris Yeltsin over a number of issues. This included his decision to ban the Communist Party and, later, the National Salvation Front. On November 30, 1992, Zorkin's court overturned Yeltsin's decision to dissolve the local branches of the Communist Party, agreeing with Yeltsin that it was legal to dissolve the ruling bodies of a political party.

In September 1993, Zorkin became involved in a bitter dispute about the legality of President Yeltsin's decision to dissolve the Supreme Soviet of Russia, a decision that went against the outdated Constitution of the RSFSR. He is often credited for standing behind the September 22, 1993 ruling by the court, which declared Yeltsin's decision unconstitutional. Although the ruling (with 9 judges supporting it and 4 against it) agreed with the Constitution, Yeltsin suspended the work of the Court and forced Zorkin to resign as President of the Court on October 6, 1993. However, he retained his position as a judge of the court.

Namely, according to reports, Sergey Filatov, Kremlin Chief of Staff, called the judges on the morning of October 5, demanding the resignation of Zorkin. However, eight out of the twelve judges present at the court session suggested that Zorkin should not resign. Four judges, including Nikolay Vitruk, Ernest Ametistov, Tamara Morshchakova, and Vladimir Oleynik recommended Zorkin's resignation. In the evening, Filatov himself contacted Zorkin and demanded that he step down, threatening to open a criminal case against him, accusing him of "creating a legal basis for the extremist activities of Rutskoy and Khasbulatov".

On October 6, Zorkin submitted his resignation as President of the Court, which was accepted by the Constitutional Court. Judge Vitruk was appointed acting President of the Constitutional Court, but on December 1 he and fellow judge Viktor Luchin were removed from the Constitutional Court after a vote of 5 against 4 over their political activity.

In December, Zorkin participated in a meeting with communists, nationalists, and other opponents to the new Constitution proposed by Yeltsin. On January 25, 1994, he was reinstated as a judge. However, in March 1994, Zorkin joined the "Concord in the Name of Russia" committee, along with Gennady Zyuganov, Alexander Rutskoy, Alexander Prokhanov, Sergey Glazyev, Stanislav Govorukhin, Aman Tuleyev et al. Despite writing the main report for the conference, Zorkin later left the Concord foundation due to his warnings from the Court regarding political activities. Following this, Zorkin stopped political activities and, as a non-president, he reportedly disagreed with the majority decision more frequently than other judges in the court. In 1995, for example, he voiced dissent over a Court ruling that the President and Prime Minister's decision to send Russian troops to Chechnya was justified.

Ten years after the court's decision that made him famous, on February 24, 2003, Zorkin was re-elected as the president of the court. Many observers viewed this as corroborative of the validity of the court's assessment of Yeltsin's actions in 1993. Controversially, in 2014, Zorkin published an article in Rossiyskaya Gazeta praising serfdom. In this article, Zorkin argued that serfdom united Russia and likened its abolition in 1861 to Yeltsin's 1990s reforms.

== Views ==
In his speeches and lectures, Valery Zorkin has repeatedly expressed the view that Russian law should take precedence over international law. He has emphasized, in particular, that the provision of the Russian Constitution giving priority to international treaties over domestic legislation does not entail a delegation of sovereignty, and that this priority cannot extend to the Russian Constitution itself.

In connection with the large number of appeals by Russian citizens to the European Court of Human Rights, Zorkin stated: "…our domestic judicial system is imperfect, including the supervisory stage as well as appellate and cassation instances. They must be brought into conformity with the standards".

Following mass demonstrations against electoral fraud in the 2011 parliamentary election, he declared that the protest fervor was "actively fanned from abroad" and that the country would be better served by people who would "not lash out at vices, but work patiently".

He sharply criticized Perestroika, describing it as "turmoil" and "chaos" devoid of any moral foundation, which prompted a polemical response from Mikhail Gorbachev.

In an article published on 26 September 2014 in Rossiyskaya Gazeta, he evaluated serfdom, abolished in 1861. He argued that the abolition of serfdom destroyed the already weakened bond between the two principal social classes of the nation, the nobility and the peasantry: "Despite all the shortcomings of serfdom, it was the main bond that held together the internal unity of the nation".

In several texts he distinguishes between legal and spiritual bonds: "For centuries, even millennia, Russia was held together by higher spiritual bonds, called by different names in different eras. Being bound by these bonds, it could treat legal bonds with greater or lesser neglect".

He believes that the February Revolution occurred because long-established canonical norms were lost: "We all know how everything that led to the tragedy of February 1917 began. It all started with small things. Soldiers, when entering church, stopped making the sign of the cross, did not put out their cigarettes, and so on. The authority of officers declined; the very negativism accumulated that at first leads only to inner rejection. And then this inner rejection turned into the collapse of all institutions, of all systems of social life".

He has spoken critically of the protection of "various kinds of minorities" at the expense of other groups in society. In a report at an international conference in Serbia, he noted: "Old democracies, inspired by liberal ideas, are moving very actively toward protecting all sorts of minorities, and often quite decisively ignore the objections of their citizens who are concerned about the consequences of such decisions". He expressed similar views in a public lecture in Seoul in 2014.

On 1 November 2016, Zorkin stated that the global legal system was collapsing, something he said had been foretold by Paul the Apostle.

On 18 May 2017, he declared that the protection of human rights should not undermine the moral foundations of society or destroy its religious identity.

At the 4th BRICS Legal Forum in Moscow, Zorkin called for the introduction of a universal basic income in Russia, following the example of Finland. In his view, the world is on the brink of moral degradation, and it is necessary to erect barriers against market egoism and growing poverty. He also noted global automation of production, which could lead to mass unemployment and even greater impoverishment.

Zorkin did not rule out the possibility of reinstating the capital punishment in Russia, according to his book, Constitutional Justice: Procedure and Meaning, published on 28 October 2021 on the Constitutional Court's website. The head of the Constitutional Court argued that the introduction of the moratorium had been a concession to values incompatible with Russian national legal consciousness, and that the issue remains unresolved. “The fact that the Constitutional Court adopted a decision that makes it impossible to apply the death penalty in Russia at this stage of its historical development does not exclude the possibility of returning to this measure of punishment in the future,” he wrote. At the same time, he stated that “a constitutional and legal regime has taken shape that provides stable guarantees against the application of the death penalty,” and expressed hope for Russia's principled renunciation of capital punishment.

In connection with this, a representative of the Russian Orthodox Church, Vakhtang Kipshidze, stated that the abolition of the death penalty is beneficial for Russia and other countries, since every criminal is capable of repentance. He emphasized that Patriarch Kirill had repeatedly spoken against restoring the death penalty in Russia. “I believe this problem should be addressed through terms of punishment and oversight that fully protect people from repeat crimes,” he said. However, in June 2022, at the St. Petersburg International Legal Forum, Zorkin stated that the death penalty cannot be reinstated in Russia by law, by referendum, or by constitutional amendment. He argued that restoring the death penalty would be a grave mistake that would derail the progress toward the humanization of legislative policy. Zorkin stressed that it is impossible to impose the death penalty because the long-standing moratorium has created stable guarantees of the right not to be subjected to it, and a constitutional regime has formed that is undergoing an irreversible process aimed at its abolition.

In June 2022, Zorkin stated that by signing the Belovezha Accords establishing the Commonwealth of Independent States, Yeltsin deprived the Russian-speaking population of Crimea and several regions of Ukraine of guarantees protecting their cultural identity.

On 29 November 2022, speaking at the 10th All-Russian Congress of Judges, he said that resuming the death penalty in Russia would be possible only through a change to the Constitution. He emphasized, however, that the wording of the provisions concerning capital punishment is such that, in practice, a completely new Constitution would be required.

In June 2024, speaking at the international conference “Human Rights and Constitutional Oversight,” held as part of the 12th St. Petersburg International Legal Forum, he again stated that reinstating the death penalty in Russia is impossible under the current Constitution.

== Sanctions ==
In December 2022, the European Union and Switzerland sanctioned Zorkin for the decision, that "artificially creates the image of the legitimacy of Russia's invasion of Ukraine and is aimed at endowing those regions with features of actors of international legal relations", following the 2022 Russian invasion of Ukraine. Earlier, he was sanctioned by Ukraine. On 24 February 2023, he was placed under Canada's sanctions as part of "close associates of the regime".

== Honours and awards ==
- Order of St. Andrew (17 February 2023)
- Order "For Merit to the Fatherland":
  - 1st class (25 October 2021)
  - 2nd class (19 October 2011)
  - 3rd class (18 February 2008)
  - 4th class (4 July 2016)
- Order of Friendship (Armenia, 9 March 2016)
- Order of the Polar Star (Mongolia, 18 September 2014)
- Letter of Gratitude from the President of the Russian Federation (2 February 2013)
- Stolypin Medal, 1st class (28 January 2013)
- Russian Federation Presidential Certificate of Honour (12 December 2008)
- Honoured Lawyer of Russia (23 March 2000)

Legal offices
Preceded by Office established	President of the Constitutional Court of Russia; 1991–1993	Next: Vladimir Tumanov
Preceded by Marat Baglai	President of the Constitutional Court of Russia; 2003–present	Incumbent
