= Order of Friendship (Armenia) =

- Insignia of the Order of Friendship
- Native name: Բարեկամության շքանշան
- Type: Order
- Awarded for: Significant services in promoting mutual understanding in the political, scientific and educational, cultural and religious spheres, as well as for strengthening and developing friendly ties between peoples
- Country: Armenia
- Presented by: President of Armenia
- Status: Active
- Established: August 9, 2014
- Total: 64 (as of 2016)

Precedence
- Next (higher): Order for Services to the Fatherland
- Next (lower): Medal for Courage

The Order of Friendship (Armenian: Բարեկամության շքանշան) is a state order of the Republic of Armenia, awarded primarily to foreign citizens for services in strengthening Armenia's ties with other nations.

== History ==
The order was established by the law "On the State Awards and Honorary Titles of the Republic of Armenia" (Law ՀՕ-100-Ն), adopted by the National Assembly on 21 June 2014, signed by the president on 18 July 2014, and entered into force on 9 August 2014.

Nominations for the order may be initiated by the prime minister of Armenia, the heads of state administrative bodies, or the mayor of Yerevan, in cases relevant to their respective fields of activity. On the order of wear, the Order of Friendship is worn on the right side of the chest, immediately after the Order for Services to the Motherland.

== Notable recipients ==
- Veronika Zonabend, co-founder and chair of the board of trustees of UWC Dilijan, awarded on 3 October 2014 for her contribution to the development of education in Armenia and the establishment of UWC Dilijan.

== See also ==
- Orders, decorations, and medals of Armenia
- Order of Honour (Armenia)
