= List of Russian architects =

This is a list of architects of the Russian Federation, Soviet Union, Russian Empire, Tsardom of Russia and Grand Duchy of Moscow, both ethnic Russians and people of other ethnicities. This list also includes those who were born in the Russian Federation/Soviet Union/Russian Empire/Tsardom of Russia/Grand Duchy of Moscow but later emigrated, and those who were born elsewhere but immigrated to the country and/or worked there for a significant period of time.

Attested biographies of architects in Russian history date back to 1475, when Aristotile Fioravanti, a native of Bologna, arrived in Moscow to build the Dormition Cathedral of the Moscow Kremlin. Foreign architects had a notable place in Russian and Soviet history, especially in the last quarter of the 18th century (Charles Cameron, Bartolomeo Rastrelli, Carlo Rossi and others) and in the first quarter of the 20th century (Mies van der Roe, Erich Mendelsohn, Ernst May and others). This list includes foreign architects whose primary, and most tangible work materialized on Russian soil (i.e. Cameron, Rastrelli, Rossi) while short-term assignments by visiting architects (Mies van der Roe, Mendelsohn, May) are omitted.

== Alphabetical list ==
=== A ===
Portrait	Person	Notable works		
	Aloisio da Milano (15th–16th cc.); Italy; Grand Duchy of Moscow architect, fortification engineer	The walls and towers of the Moscow Kremlin along the Neglinnaya River, 1495; the stone chambers, which today constitute the first three floors of the Terem Palace 1499–1508; a moat (later dubbed the Alevizov moat in his honor) along the Kremlin Wall on the side of the Red Square, 1508–16.	Troitskaya Tower	Terem Palace, 1797 Quarenghi's veduta
	Aloisio the New (15th–16th cc.); Italy; Grand Duchy of Moscow architect	Some sections of the Bakhchisaray palace, Crimea, before 1504; Archangel Cathedral, the burial place of Moscow's monarchs 1505–08; Cathedral of the Metropolitan Peter in Vysokopetrovsky Monastery, Moscow, admittedly the earliest rotunda in Russia 1514–17.	Archangel Cathedral	Cathedral of the Metropolitan Peter, Vysokopetrovsky Monastery

=== B ===
Portrait	Person	Notable works		
	Gavriil Baranovsky (1860–1920); Russian Empire eclectics and Art Nouveau architect	Baltic Shipyard workshops (assistant to Ernest Gibert), St. Petersburg, 1880; Elisseeff Emporium, St. Petersburg, 1900–03; Buddhist Temple, St. Petersburg, 1909–15.	Elisseeff Emporium, St. Petersburg	Buddhist datsan, St. Petersburg
	Petr Baranovsky (1892–1984); Russian Empire; Soviet Union architect, preservationist, restorer	Credited with saving Saint Basil's Cathedral from destruction in the early 1930s, founding and managing the Kolomenskoye and Andrei Rublev museums, and developing modern restoration technologies; restored Golden Gate in Vladimir; restored Krutitsy Metochion in Moscow.	Restored Golden Gate, Vladimir	Restored Metropolitan's Chamber in Krutitsy, Moscow
	Vasili Bazhenov (1737–1799); Russian Empire neoclassical and Gothic Revival architect, graphic artist, architectural theorist and educator	Moscow's Tsaritsyno Park buildings (first palace, Figurny Bridge, Opera House), 1775–86; Pashkov House in Moscow (attribution disputed), 1784–86.	Figurny Bridge in Tsaritsyno, Moscow	Pashkov House (Russian National Library), Moscow
	Leon Benois (1856–1928); Russian Empire; Soviet Union (French descent) eclectical, neoclassical, Neo-Gothic and Russian Revival architect (son of Nicholas Benois)	Roman Catholic cathedral of Notre-Dame of Lourdes in St. Petersburg (together with Marian Peretyatkovich), 1903–09; Alexander Nevsky Cathedral, Warsaw (later demolished), 1894–1912; The House of Benua in St. Petersburg (together with Albert Benois and Yuly Benois), 1911–14.	Alexander Nevsky Cathedral, Warsaw, (demolished)	The House of Benua, St. Petersburg
	Nicholas Benois (1813–1898); Russian Empire (French descent); Gothic Revival architect (father of Leon Benois, Alexander Benois and Albert Benois)	A court architect to Nicholas I of Russia, he oversaw many projects in the imperial residence in Petergof, notably the Principal Imperial Stables, 1847–52; rebuilt the fountain cascades of Petergof; designed the number of the first railway stations in Russia, like in Strelna, Tsarskoe Selo, and New Petergof (latter in 1857).	Chess mountain Cascade in Petergof	New Petergof railway station
	Alexander Bernadazzi (1831–1907)		Chişinău City Hall	St. Teodora de la Sihla Church, Chişinău
	Karl Blank (1728–1793)		Moscow Orphanage	Church of Trinity in Serebryaniki, Moscow
	Ilya Bondarenko (1867–1947)		Exhibition Pavilion of Abrikosov Factories (with Alexander Kaminsky)	Old Believers' Church of Intercession of Theotokos, Moscow
	Joseph Bové (1784–1834)		Triumphal Arch in Moscow	Moscow Manege
	Vincenzo Brenna (1745–1820)		Folly Bip Fortress, Pavlovsk	Saint Michael's Castle, St. Petersburg
	Alexander Brullov (1798–1877); Russian Empire (French descent); Neoclassical architect and painter (self-portrait)	Most of his works were created in St. Petersburg: Mikhaylovsky Theatre, 1831–33; Lutheran Church of St. Peter and St. Paul, 1833–38; Pulkovo Observatory, 1834–39; the Headquarters of Guard Corps on Palace Square, 1837–43; Pompei Hall, the Malachite Room and the White Hall in Winter Palace (after 1837).	Pulkovo Observatory, St. Petersburg	Malachite Room of the Winter Palace, St. Petersburg

=== C ===
Portrait	Person	Notable works		
	Charles Cameron (1743–1812)		Cameron's Gallery, Tsarskoye Selo	Pavlovsk Palace
	Francesco Camporesi (1747–1831)		Lobanov-Rostovsky House, Moscow	Voskresensky Hospital, Moscow
	Alberto Cavos (1800–1863); Russian Empire (Italian descent) neoclassical architect, theatre designer (the grandfather of Albert Benois, Leon Benois and Alexander Benois)	Rebuilt the Bolshoi Kamenny Theatre in St. Petersburg, 1826–36 (mostly demolished and replaced by Saint Petersburg Conservatory); the Bolshoi Theatre in Moscow, 1853–56; completed rebuilding of the Mikhaylovsky Theatre in St. Petersburg, 1859; the Mariinsky Theatre in St. Petersburg, 1859–60.	Moscow's Bolshoi Theatre in Cavos times	Mariinsky Theatre, St. Petersburg
	Serge Chermayeff (1900–1996)		The De La Warr Pavilion (with Erich Mendelsohn)	

=== D ===
Portrait	Person	Notable works
	Alexey Dushkin (1904–1977)	

=== E ===
Portrait	Person	Notable works		
	Mikhail Eisenstein (1867–1921)		Elizabetes Street 10b, Riga	2a at Albert Street, Riga

=== F ===
Portrait	Person	Notable works		
	Yury Felten (1730–1801); Russian Empire (German descent) baroque, neoclassical and Gothic Revival architect, engineer	A court architect to Catherine the Great, he created most of his works in St. Petersburg: a heavy-lifting machine that moved the enormous Thunder Stone rock, the pedestal of the Bronze Horseman, 1770; Chesme Church and Palace, 1770–80; iron-cast grille of the Summer Garden, 1783; granite embankments of Neva, 1764–84 the Old Hermitage wing of the Winter Palace, 1771–87.	Chesme Church, St. Petersburg	Cast-iron grille of the Summer Garden, St. Petersburg
	Aristotile Fioravanti (1415–1420 – c. 1486); Italy; Grand Duchy of Moscow; Renaissance architect and engineer	Palazzo del Podestà, Bologna, Italy, 1453; Dormition Cathedral, Moscow, 1475–79.	Palazzo del Podestà, Bologna, Italy	Dormition Cathedral, Moscow
	Ivan Fomin (1872–1936)		Krasnye Vorota (Moscow Metro)	Government of Ukraine, Kyiv

=== G ===
Portrait	Person	Notable works		
	Domenico Gilardi (1785–1845)		Old Building of the Moscow State University	Riding Court in Kuzminki Park, Moscow
	Moisei Ginzburg (1892–1946)		Gosstrakh Apartments, Moscow	
	Ilya Golosov (1883–1945)		Zuev Workers' Club, Moscow	Yauzsky Boulevard 2, Moscow
	Afanasy Grigoriev (1782–1868)		Khrushyov House, now Alexander Pushkin Museum	Lopukhin House, now Leo Tolstoy Museum
	Alexey Gornostaev (1808–1862)		Nikolsky Skit (Church) at the Valaam Monastery	Uspenski Cathedral, Helsinki, Finland
	Fyodor Gornostaev (1867–1915)		Krutitsy Metochion (restoration work)	Rogozhskoye Cemetery Belltower
	David Grimm (1823–1898); Russian Empire neo-Byzantine and Russian Revival style architect	Grimm designed numerous Eastern Orthodox churches in Western Europe, Jerusalem and Russian Empire : Church of Maria Magdalene in Jerusalem, 1885–88; Cathedral of Saint Alexander Nevsky, Tbilisi, 1871–97 (demolished); Saint Vladimir Cathedral in Chersonesos, Crimea, 1858–97.	Church of Maria Magdalene in Jerusalem	Chersonesus Cathedral of Saint Vladimir, Crimea

=== H ===
Portrait	Person	Notable works		
	Viktor Hartmann (1834–1873)		Millennium of Russia, Novgorod (architecture)	Naval section of the Russian pavilion at 1873 Wien World Fair
	William Heste (Hastie) (1763–1832)		Police (Green) Bridge, St. Petersburg	An office building at Izhora Plants, St. Petersburg

=== I ===
Portrait	Person	Notable works		
	Boris Iofan (1891–1976); Russian Empire; Soviet Union constructivist and Stalin Empire style architect	House on Embankment, Moscow, 1928–31; 1931–33 winning draft of the Palace of Soviets (never built); Soviet Pavilions at 1937 World's Fair in Paris and 1939 World's Fair in New York City; Baumanskaya station of Moscow Metro, 1944.	House on Embankment, Moscow	
	Illarion Ivanov-Schitz (1865–1937)		Lenkom Theatre Building, Moscow	Furmanny Lane 19, Moscow

=== K ===
Portrait	Person	Notable works		
	Alexander Kaminsky (1829–1897		Tretyakov Drive Arch, Moscow	Transfiguration Cathedral at Nikolo-Ugresh monastery
	Matvey Kazakov (1738–1812)		Kremlin Senate, Moscow	Moscow City Hall
	Lev Kekushev (1862–1919)		Mindovsky House (Embassy of New Zealand), Moscow	Ponizovsky House (Embassy of Afghanistan), Moscow
	Roman Klein (1858–1924)		Pushkin Museum, Moscow	TsUM Department Store, Moscow
	Alexander Kokorinov (1726–1772)		Imperial Academy of Arts, St. Petersburg (with Vallin de la Mothe)	
	Fyodor Kon (fl. 1585–1600); Tsardom of Russia fortification engineer and architect a monument in Smolensk Kremlin on photo	the walls and towers of Novospassky Monastery in Moscow and several other Russian monasteries; Bely Gorod fortification ring of Moscow, 1585–93 (in 18th–19th centuries replaced with the Boulevard Ring); Smolensk Kremlin, the largest one in Russia, 1597–1602.	Semiverhaya (Seven-tops) tower of Moscow's Bely Gorod	Smolensk Kremlin wall in 1912
	Ivan Kuznetsov (1867–1942)		Business Yard at Varvarsky Gates, Moscow	Povarskaya Street 9, Moscow
	Andrey Kvasov (1720–1770)		Grand Ball Hall in Catherine Palace, St. Petersburg	Church on Hay Square in St. Petersburg (demolished)

=== L ===
Portrait	Person	Notable works
	Nikolai Ladovsky (1881–1941)	
	Nikolay Lanceray (1880–1942)	
	Nikita Lazarev (1866–1932)	
	Ivan Leonidov (1902–1959)	
	El Lissitzky (1890–1941)	
	Berthold Lubetkin (1901–1990)	

=== M ===
Portrait	Person	Notable works		
	Ivan Mashkov (1867–1945)			
	Georg Johann Mattarnovy (died 1719); Holy Roman Empire; Tsardom of Russia; Baroque architect and sculptor	The Third Winter Palace, St. Petersburg, 1719–21; Kunstkamera, St. Petersburg, 1719–27.	The Third Winter Palace, St. Petersburg (demolished)	Kunstkamera, St. Petersburg
	Konstantin Melnikov (1890–1974)			
	Adam Menelaws (between 1748 and 1756–1831)			
	Miron Merzhanov (1895–1975)			
	Maximilian Messmacher (1842–1906)			
	Ivan Michurin (1700–1763)			
	Ippolit Monighetti (1819–1878)			
	Auguste de Montferrand (1786–1858)			
	Arkady Mordvinov (1896–1964)			
Muratkhanov in 1964	Nasreddin Muratkhanov (1904–1970); Russian Empire / Soviet Union; An ethnic Turk, architect and civil engineer, migrated to Pakistan in 1950	Minar-i Pakistan (23 March 1960 – 26 July 1967); Gaddafi Stadium, Lahore	Minar-i Pakistan	

=== N ===
Portrait	Person	Notable works
	Nikolai Nikitin (1907–1973); Russian Empire; Soviet Union structural designer and construction engineer	Invented a number of innovative techniques, including the usage of prestressed concrete with wire ropes; works include: Moscow State University, 240 m, 1949–53; Warsaw Palace of Culture and Science, 237 m, 1952–55; Luzhniki Stadium in Moscow, 1955–56; The Motherland Calls statue on Mamayev Kurgan in Volgograd, 85 m, 1967; Ostankino Tower, 540 m, 1963–67; Nikitin-Travush 4000 project (4000 metres, precursor to X-Seed 4000)
	Ivan Nikolaev (1901–1979)	
	Felix Novikov (1927–2022)	

=== O ===
Portrait	Person	Notable works
	Vyacheslav Oltarzhevsky (1880–1966)	

=== P ===
Portrait	Person	Notable works		
	Alfred Parland (1842–1919) (Scottish descent)	Church of the Resurrection of Christ in St. Petersburg	Church of the Savior on Blood, Saint Petersburg	Holy Resurrection Cathedral (destroyed 1968), Coastal Monastery of St. Sergius
	Marian Peretyatkovich (1872–1916)			
	Petrok Maly (? – c. 1539); Italy; Grand Duchy of Moscow	Credited as a possible architect of the Ascension Church in Kolomenskoye (an early tented roof church), 1528–32; Kitai-gorod wall and towers (now mostly dismantled), 1533–38; Sebezh Kremlin wall (now dismantled), 1539	Ascension Church in Kolomenskoye, Moscow	Remaining part of the Kitai-gorod wall in Zaryadye, Moscow
	Alexander Pomerantsev (1849–1918)			
	Anatoly Polyansky (1928–1993)			

=== Q ===
Portrait	Person	Notable works	
	Giacomo Quarenghi (1744–1817)		Smolny Institute, St. Petersburg

=== R ===
Portrait	Person	Notable works	
	Bartolomeo Rastrelli (1700–1771)		
	Ivan Rerberg (1869–1932)		
	Antonio Rinaldi (1710–1794)		
	Ivan Ropet (1845–1908)		
	Carlo Rossi (1775–1849)		
	Lev Rudnev (1885–1956); Russian Empire; Soviet Union; Stalin Empire style architect	Moscow State University (1949–1953); Palace of Culture and Science in Warsaw, Poland, (1952–1955); Latvian Academy of Sciences, Riga, Latvia, (1953–1956).	237 metre Warsaw Palace of Culture, Poland
	Marco Ruffo (15th century)		

=== S ===
Portrait	Person	Notable works		
	Fyodor Schechtel (1859–1926)			
	Xavier Schoellkopf (1869–1911)	Apartment buildings in Paris, e.g. 29 boulevard de Courcelles		
	Vladimir Shchuko (1878–1939)			
	Alexey Shchusev (1873–1949)			
	Vladimir Osipovich Sherwood (1832–1897)			
	Vladimir Vladimirovich Sherwood (1867–1930)			
	Vladimir Shukhov (1853–1939)			
	Pietro Antonio Solari (15th century)			
	Ivan Starov (1745–1808)			
	Andrei Stackenschneider (1802–1865)			
	Vasily Stasov (1769–1848)			
	Joseph Sunlight (1888–1978)			
	Pavel Suzor (1844–1919); Russian Empire eclectics and Art Nouveau architect	Over 80 apartment, baths and corporate buildings in St. Petersburg, including: Ushakov House, 1882–83; First Mutual Credit Society House, 1888–90; Singer House, 1902–04;	Ushakov House, St. Petersburg	Singer House, St. Petersburg

=== T ===
Portrait	Person	Notable works		
	Vladimir Tatlin (1885–1953)			
	Konstantin Thon (1794–1881)			
	Domenico Trezzini (1670–1734); Switzerland; Tsardom of Russia; Russian Empire (Swiss Italian); Petrine Baroque architect	Trezzini was the first chief architect of the newly founded Saint Petersburg; he designed the first general plan of St. Petersburg, as well as plans of Kronstadt (1704) and the Alexander Nevsky Monastery (1717), and supervised a number of major projects: Peter and Paul Fortress (since 1703), with the Peter and Paul Cathedral inside, 1712–33; Peter the Great's Summer Palace, 1710–11; Twelve Collegia Building (now the main building of Saint Petersburg University), 1722–36.	Summer Palace, St. Petersburg Twelve Collegia Building, St. Petersburg	122 metre Peter and Paul Cathedral, St. Petersburg
	Zurab Tsereteli (born 1934)			
	Yevgraph Tyurin (1793–1873)			

=== U ===
Portrait	Person	Notable works
	Dmitry Ukhtomsky (1719–1774)	

=== V ===
Portrait	Person	Notable works		
	Victor Vasnetsov (1848–1926)			
	Alexander Vesnin (1883–1959)			
	Leonid Vesnin (1880–1933)			
	Victor Vesnin (1882–1950)			
	Aleksandr Vitberg (1787–1855)			
	Andrey Voronikhin (1759–1814); Russian Empire neoclassical and Empire style architect and painter	neoclassical interiors of Stroganov Palace, St. Petersburg, 1793; Voronikhin colonnades and Lion cascade in Petergof; Kazan Cathedral, St. Petersburg, 1801–11; Saint Petersburg Mining Institute, 1806–11.	Kazan Cathedral, St. Petersburg	Saint Petersburg Mining Institute
	Mikhail Vrubel (1856–1910)			

=== Y ===
Portrait	Person	Notable works		
	Postnik Yakovlev (16th century); Grand Duchy of Moscow; Tsardom of Russia tented-roof architect and fortification engineer	Saint Basil's Cathedral on Red Square in Moscow, 1555–60; with Ivan ShirIai designed the walls of the Kazan Kremlin and, according to some sources, the Cathedral of the Assumption in Kazan, 1561–62.	Saint Basil's Cathedral, Moscow	Kazan Kremlin wall
	Vasili Yermolin (15th century)			

=== Z ===
Portrait	Person	Notable works		
	Andreyan Zakharov (1761–1811)			
	Alexander Zelenko (1871–1953)			
	Mikhail Zemtsov (1688–1743); Tsardom of Russia; Russian Empire; Petrine Baroque architect	participated in designing the Summer Garden in St. Petersburg and the park in Petergof; completed the design of Catherinethal palace and park in Tallinn 1718–25; The Church of Simon and Annа, Saint Petersburg, 1734;	Catherinethal palace in Tallinn, Estonia	The Church of Simon and Annа, Saint Petersburg
	Nikolay Zherikhov (1870s–1916)			
	Ivan Zholtovsky (1867–1959)			

== See also ==
- Russian architecture
- List of Russian artists
- List of Russian explorers
- List of Russian inventors
- List of Russian language writers
- Russian culture

== Sources ==
Nachokina, Maria (2005). Arhitektory moskovskogo moderna ("Архитекторы московского модерна") (in Russian). Moscow: Giraffe. ISBN 978-5-89832-043-0.
