= Saint Petersburg State University of Architecture and Civil Engineering =

Coordinates: 59°54′53″N 30°18′56″E

- Санкт-Петербургский государственный архитектурно-строительный университет
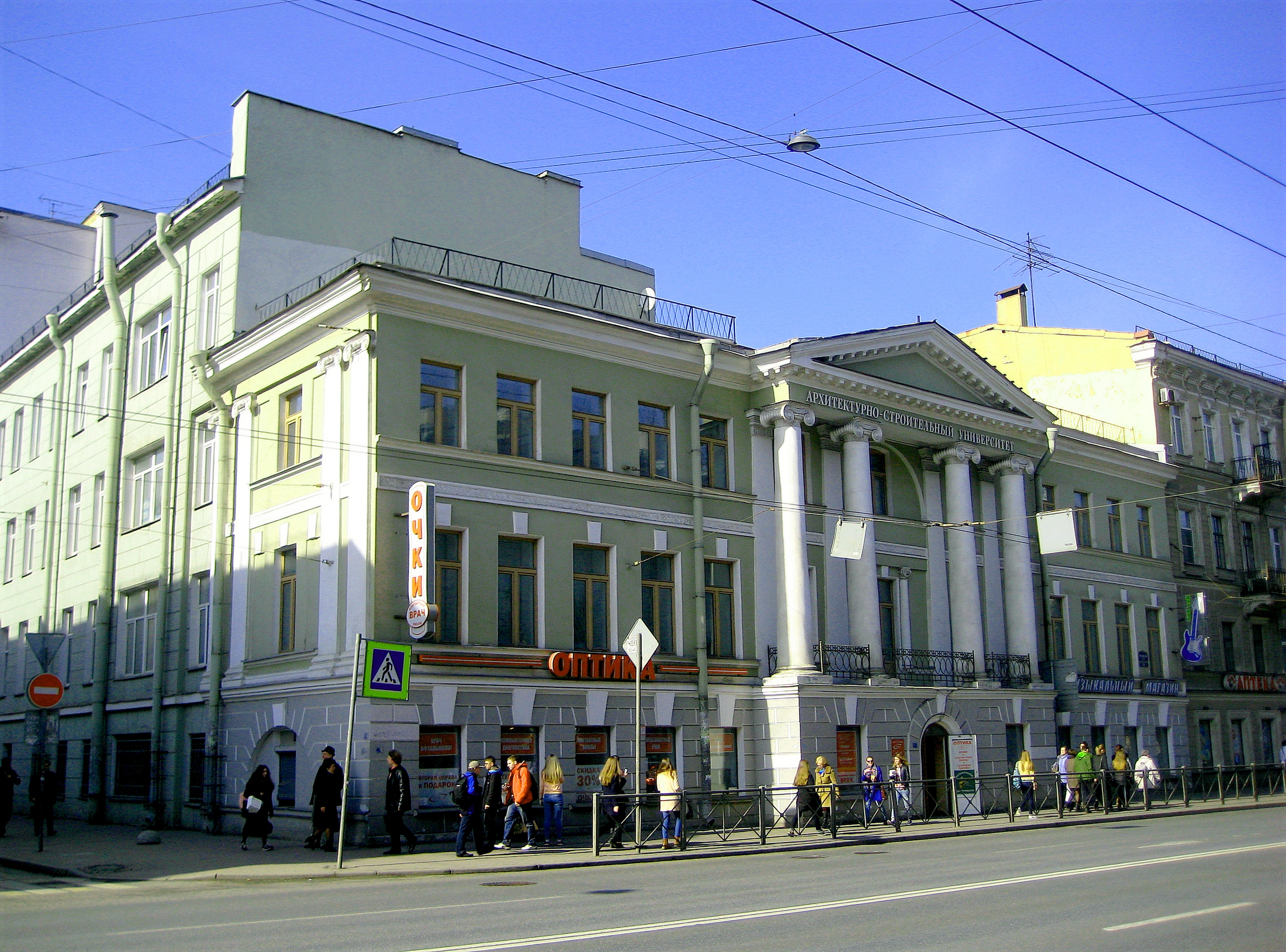
- Type: University
- Established: 1832; 194 years ago
- Rector: Evgeny Rybnov
- Location: 2nd Krasnoarmeiskaya Str. 4, 190005, Saint Petersburg, Russia
- Website: spbgasu.ru/en

University rankings

Regional – Overall
- QS Emerging Europe and Central Asia: 401-450 (2022)

Saint Petersburg State University of Architecture and Civil Engineering (SPSUACE) (Russian: Санкт-Петербургский государственный архитектурно-строительный университет (СПбГАСУ), romanized: Sankt-Peterburgskiy gosudarstvennyy arkhitekturno-stroitel'nyy universitet (SPbGASU)) is a Russian federal state-owned higher education institution based in Saint Petersburg.

== History ==
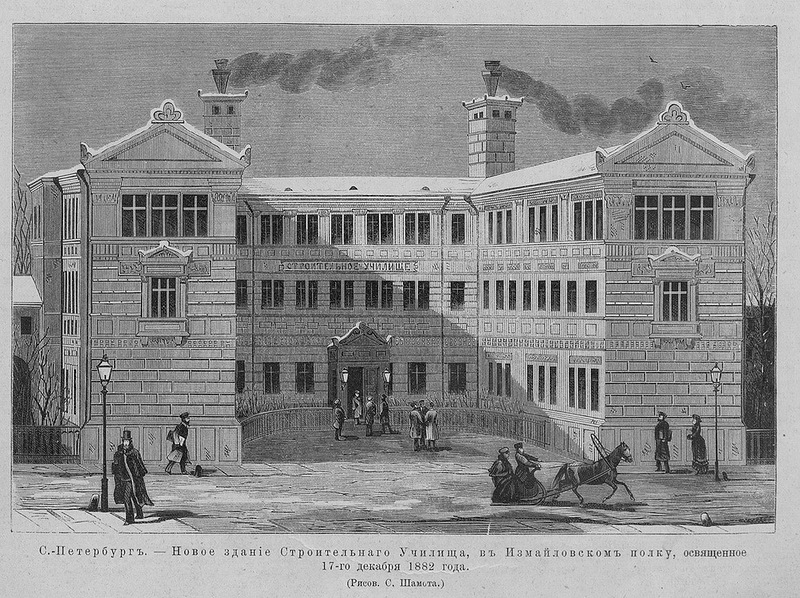
The Civil Engineering Institute on a 1882 illustration

SPSUACE history goes back to 1832 when it was established pursuant to the edict of the Emperor Nicholas I as the Civil Engineering Institute. Since then the University has undergone transformations and changed its name several times. The present name was given to the University on June 21, 1993.

During its existence, SPSUACE has provided an education for more than 70 000 architects and engineers including specialists who had come from over 50 foreign states. Its academic staff has included D.I.Grimm, V.A.Schröter, V.V.Evald, P.Yu.Suser, A.I.Gogen, as well as Senior Lecturers and Professor N.A.Belieliubskiy.

During the period after the WW II, the University's graduates participated in the restoration of the city and industrial objects much destroyed by the enemy. The economically hard period of so-called "perestroika" (1990s) was gone through relatively painlessly. Since the early 21st century the number of the SPSUACE graduates is over 1000 professionals.

Its graduates were the authors of the General Development plan of the city (V.A.Kamenskiy, A.I. Naumov), the architectural plans of the Kirov Stadium (A.S.Nikolskiy), BCH “Oktiabrskiy” (G.P.Morozov), the ensemble of the Victory Square with the Monument to the Heroic Defenders of the City (architect S.B.Speranskiy, V.A.Kamenskiy and sculptor M.A. Anikushin), the hotel “Pribaltiyskaya” (N.N.Baranov and others), a lot of underground stations "Avtovo", "Baltiyskaya", "Gorkovskaya", "Grazhdansky Prospekt", "Yelizarovskaya", "Kirovsky Zavod", "Moskovskaya", "Narvskaya", "Ploshchad Alexandra Nevskogo I", "Politekhnicheskaya", "Tekhnologichesky Institut").

The University has a faculty of 629 men and women. It numbers 4 Corresponding Members and 7 Councillors of Russian Academy of Architecture and Construction Sciences, 89 Doctors of Science and 357 Ph.D.s. Presently there are approximately 8400 students, concentrating their studies in science and engineering, and 243 post-graduates, working on their Ph.D. and DSc theses at the University.

The University carries out its editorial activities publishing educational and scientific literature. Important elements of the innovation infrastructure of the University are: Scientific-Technical Council; Scientific-Technical Library which is a treasury of modern scientific-technical literature and rarities; basic chairs and scientific research laboratories. Scientific-research results received by the University specialists are published in scientific journals and other publications. (“Vestnik Grazhdanskih Inzhenerov”, “Ingenernije Sistiemi”,“Peterburgskiy Stroitelniy Rinok”, etc.).

SPSUACE had international cooperation with other academic institutions, government agencies and private organizations. The University has cooperated in joint research work with partners from Germany, Italy, France, Austria, Poland, Finland, USA, China, etc.

== Educational activities ==
The university has about 10,000 students, 117 classrooms, 28 teaching laboratories located in 55 classrooms, and five educational and computer centers. It has 638 teachers, including 420 with academic degrees and titles, one member of Russian Academy of Architecture and Construction Sciences (RAACS), as well as five corresponding members and seven councilors of the Academy. There are seven faculties and 48 departments. It offers bachelor's and master's degrees in 26 major professional educational programs and 17 postgraduate programs of additional vocational training. Throughout its history, the university has trained about 70,000 specialists.

== Faculties ==
- Faculty of architecture
- Faculty of civil engineering
- Faculty of environmental engineering and municipal services
- Faculty of automobile and road-building
- Faculty of economics and management
- Faculty of forensics and law in construction and transport

== Famous alumni ==
- Zivar bey Ahmadbeyov (1902) – Azerbaijani architect, chief architect of Baku (1918–1922)
- Gavriil Baranovsky (1882) – Russian architect, civil engineer, art historian, and publisher
- Józef Gosławski (1891) – Polish architect
- Eduard Gurwits (1971) – Ukrainian politician, the mayor of Odessa
- Andrey Dostoyevsky (1848) – Russian architect, memoirist, brother of writer Fyodor Dostoyevsky
- Mikhail Eisenstein (1893) – Riga architect, father of director Sergei Eisenstein
- Lidia Klement (1960) – singer
- Evgeny Kliachkin (1957) – Russian and Israeli poet, singer, entertainer
- Yevgeny Nesterenko (1961) – opera singer (bass)
- Marian Peretyatkovich (1901) – Russian architect
- Sergei Polonsky (1972) – Russian architect, builder and developer
- Volodymyr Sichynskyi (1917) – Ukrainian architect, graphic artist and art critic
- Alexander Beglov (1983) – Russian politician, governor of Saint Petersburg
- Olga Taratynova - Russian architect and conservator, director of State Museum-Reserve Tsarskoye Selo
