= 56 Nevsky Prospect =

56 Nevsky Prospect may refer to:

- Eliseyev Emporium (Saint Petersburg)
- Saint Petersburg Comedy Theatre
