= Olga Taratynova =

- Ольга Таратынова
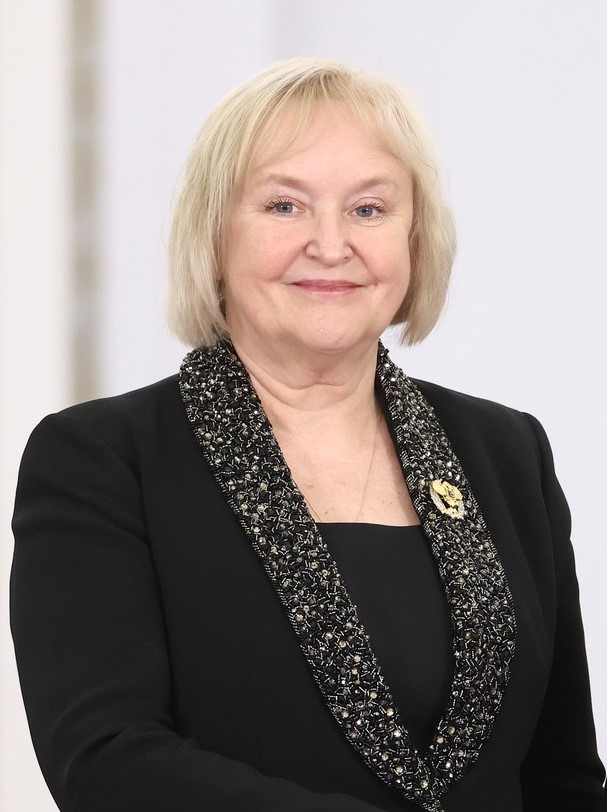
- Born: 14 September 1955 (age 70); Leningrad, Soviet Union
- Education: Leningrad Engineering-Construction Institute
- Known for: Restorer of various objects in Saint Petersburg and Tsarskoye Selo
- Awards: (2023)

Olga Vladislavovna Taratynova (Russian: Ольга Владиславовна Таратынова; born 14 September 1955) is a Russian architect and restorer who serves as the director of the State Museum-Reserve Tsarskoye Selo.

== Biography ==
In 1977 she graduated from the architectural faculty of the Leningrad Engineering-Construction Institute Since 1981, she worked as an architect in the State Inspectorate for the Protection of Monuments, then as a district architect of the Pushkinsky and Admiralteysky districts. Since 1996 she is the first Deputy chairman of the Committee for State Control, Use and Protection of Historical and Cultural Monuments of Saint Petersburg. From September 2008 she is serving as the Director of the State Museum-Reserve "Tsarskoye Selo" During her tenure, large-scale restoration of the Alexander Palace occurred, such as the restoration of Catherine II's private rooms in the Zubovsky Wing of the Catherine Palace. She is a member of the Union of Architects of Russia and holds the title Honoured Restorer of the Russian Federation. Honoured Builder of Russia; Chairman of the Board of the National Association "Revival of Historical Gardens and Parks". She was awarded the State Prize of the Russian Federation in 2024.
