= Marian Peretyatkovich =

Russian architect (1872–1916)

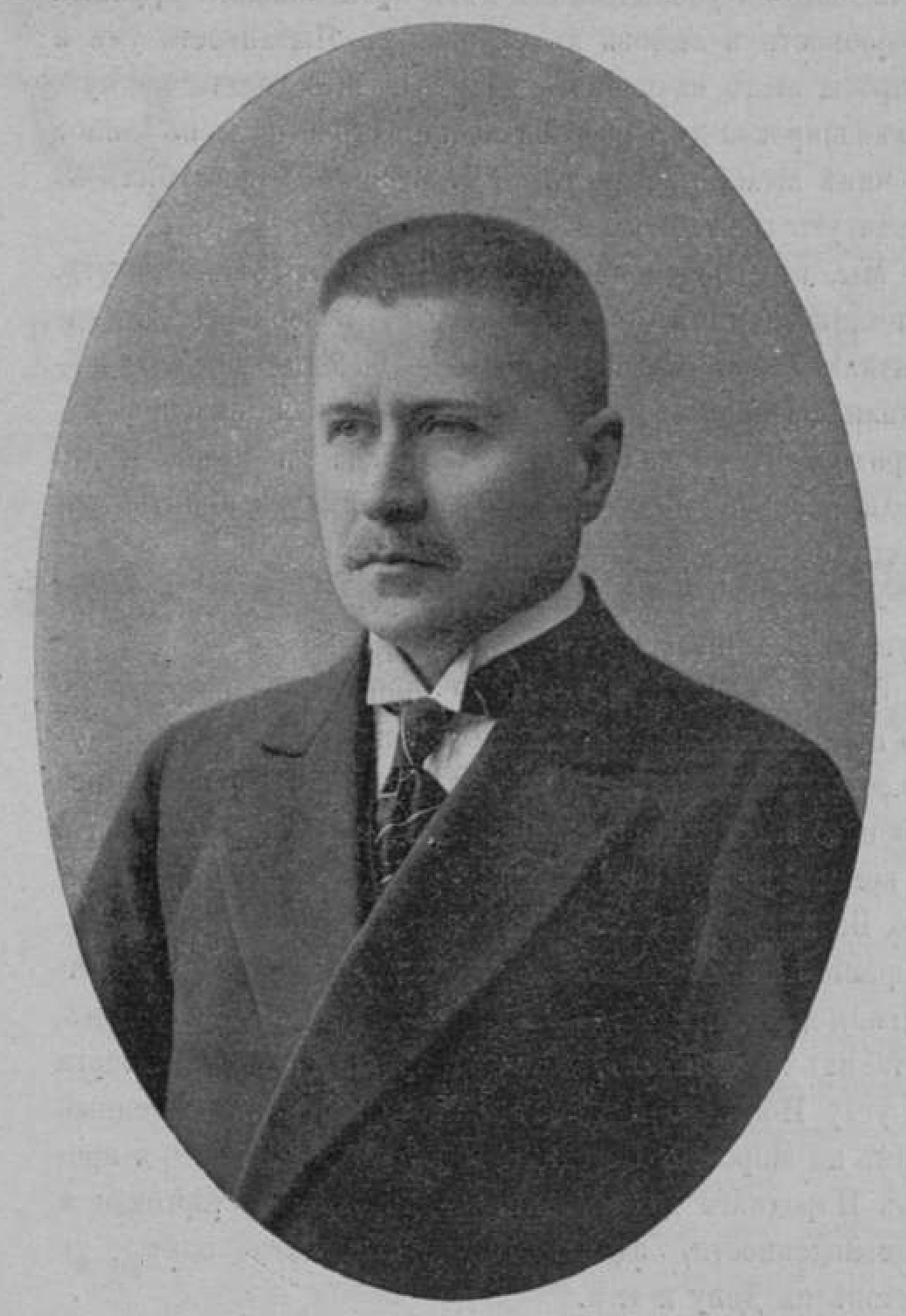
- Born: August 23, 1872; Usychi, Volhynian Governorate, Russian Empire
- Died: May 22, 1916 (aged 43); Kiev, Russian Empire
- Education: Institute of Civil Engineers, Imperial Academy of Arts
- Occupation: Architect

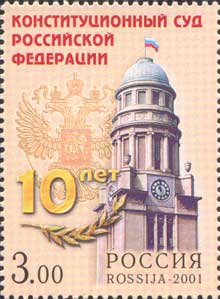
In 2001 Russia issued a postal stamp where the headquarters of the Constitutional Court of Russia. The stamp commemorates the 10th anniversary of the court.

Marian Marianovich Peretyatkovich (Russian: Мариа́н Мариа́нович Перетя́ткович; 23 August 1872 – 22 May 1916) was a Russian architect of Polish descent. His premature death at the age of 43 limited his career to only eight years of independent practice (1908–1916), however, he managed to excel in a rational (Finnish) variety of late Art Nouveau, Renaissance Revival and Russian Revival in Saint Petersburg and Moscow. He is sometimes compared with Louis Sullivan on account of his insistence on functionality of office buildings.

== Biography ==
=== Training ===
Peretyatkovich trained at Saint Petersburg Institute of Civil Engineers, graduating in 1901, and the Imperial Academy of Arts under Leon Benois (1901–1906). Still at college, Peretyatkovich became famous as a refined draftsman; architect like Gavriil Baranovsky, Roman Klein and Ivan Rerberg hired him for drafting and interior designs. Thus, Peretyatkovich was involved in such high-profile jobs as the Hotel Metropol, Elisseeff Emporium, and the Pushkin Museum. Before graduation, Peretyatkovich secured a solid reputation among professionals in both capitals of Russia.

In 1907, he travelled over Europe on the academy study tour, and learned the Finnish version of Art Nouveau practiced by Eliel Saarinen and Lars Sonck, as well as Roman architecture of Southern Europe; both these styles became the trademarks of his short career.

=== Own practice ===
On his return from Europe, Peretyatkovich designed his first major project - Solodovnikov's Cheap Apartment Building in Moscow (it was executed by Traugott Bardt), a typical Northern Moderne, Saint Petersburg version of Art Nouveau. His second project - the Northern Insurance Buildings in Moscow, was executed in collaboration with Ivan Rerberg and Vyacheslav Oltarzhevsky in stern Neoclassical Revival. This buildings are also notable as Ilya Golosov's first employment and for Sergei Rachmaninoff melody written for the chiming clock. Now, they house the Constitutional Court of Russia.

Since 1905, his professional bond with another local architect of Polish descent - Marian Lalewicz - was established.

In Saint Petersburg, Peretyatkovich designed various office and residential buildings; the best known, Wawelberg Trade Bank (1911–1912), combines neoclassical composition with Renaissance exterior (in the same period, Ivan Zholtovsky built a similar but far smaller Tarasov House in Moscow).

The historicist dimension of Peretiatkovich's work is even more pronounced in his designs for St Petersburg churches. He oversaw the construction of the Saviour Church "on Waters" (Спас-на-Водах), inspired by the 12th-century architecture of Vladimir-Suzdal and commemorating Russian sailors who perished during the Russo-Japanese War. The church was demolished by the Leningrad authorities in 1932. His other major project was the Roman Catholic church of Notre-Dame de Lourdes (1908–09), inspired by Romanesque architecture of Northern Europe and designed in collaboration with Leon Benois.

His last work was a memorial chapel for the late Prince Oleg Konstantinovich of Russia, modelled after historical Pskov churches.

=== Private life ===
Peretyatkovich was born in a Roman Catholic family of Euzebiusz Peretiatkowicz, an impoverished nobleman. During his career in Petersburg, the architect was involved in activity of many local, Polish associations. In 1912 he married Janina Maria, one year later their only son was born. In 1916 Peretyatkovich's relatives in his ancestral estate died due to World War I front operations. The shocking news led Peretyatkovich to fatal heart attack.

== Legacy ==
Peretyatkovich, as the youngest member of Neoclassical Revival movement after 1915, had a solid influence on Saint Petersburg architects of his period, securing the leading role of this style together with Vladimir Shchuko and Ivan Fomin.

His early reputation as a talented graphic artist in college and a very short architectural career that left a lasting influence are reminiscent of another architect, Konstantin Melnikov.

== Completed buildings ==
=== Saint Petersburg ===
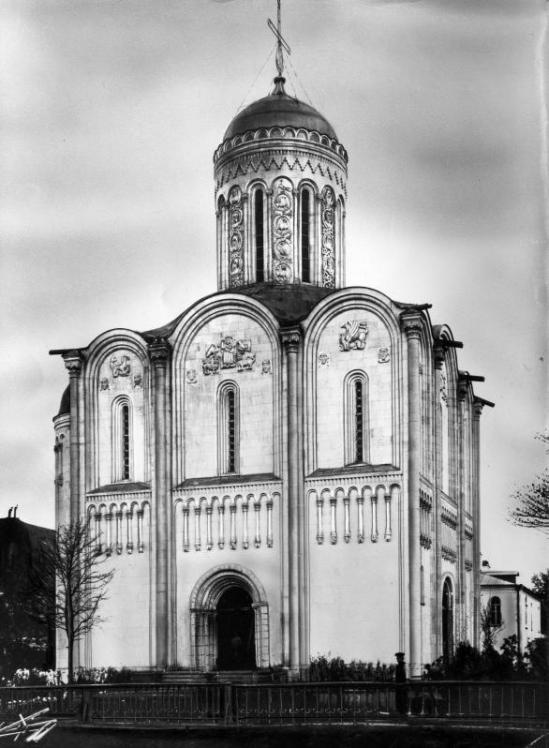
Saviour on the Waters church (destroyed). Photo by 1910s.

- 1907-1908 Interiors, State Council Hall, 6 Isaakievskaya Square (with Leon Benois)
- 1907-1909 Notre Dame de France church, 7 Kovensky Lane
- 1908 Bridge over Fontanka (with Leon Benois)
- 1908-1909 Salamandra apartment building, 4 Gorokhovaya Street
- 1910-1911 Saviour on the Waters church (destroyed)
- 1911-1912 Wawelberg Trading Bank and apartments, 7-9 Nevsky Prospect
- 1912-1913 Catholic orphanage, 19 Kirillovskaya Street
- 1912-1913 City services building, 49 Kronverksky Prospect
- 1912-1914 Russian Trade and Industry Bank, 15 Bolshaya Morskaya Street
- 1914-1915 Ministry for Trade and Industry, 8 Makarova Embankment

=== Moscow ===
- 1899-1900 Assistant to Roman Klein on Pushkin Museum
- 1898-1907 Assistant to Gavriil Baranovsky on Elisseeff Store, 14 Tverskaya Street
- 1901-1903 Assistant to Hotel Metropol (Moscow) architects
- 1965-1908 Solodovnikov Cheap Apartment Building, 65 Gilyarovskogo Street
- 1909-1918 Northern Insurance Society, 23 Ilyinka Street (with Ivan Rerberg, Vyacheslav Oltarzhevsky)
- 1915-1916 Prince Oleg Konstantinovich of Russia memorial chapel, Ostashevo, Volokolamsk District

=== Rostov-on-Don ===
- 1910s State Bank building
