= Lidia Klement =

Soviet singer (1937–1964)

Lidia Richardovna Klement
- Ли́дия Ри́хардовна Кле́мент
- Born: 8 July 1937; Leningrad
- Died: 16 June 1964 (aged 26)
- Education: Leningrad Institute of Civil Engineering
- Occupation: Singer
- Years active: 1958–1964
- Notable work: Karelia; Rain on the Neva; Is All This for Me Alone?

Lidia Richardovna Klement (Russian: Ли́дия Ри́хардовна Кле́мент; 8 July 1937 – 16 June 1964) was a Soviet singer.

== Early life ==
She was involved with music and singing since childhood, studying piano at a music school for children and singing in a choir. Later, when studying at the Leningrad Institute of Civil Engineering, Klement sang in a student jazz ensemble.

== Career ==
After graduation, she worked for two years as a design engineer and sang with the Naum Tyomkin Variety Orchestra at the Ordzhonikidze Palace of Culture. In 1958, for about a year, she sang with the ensemble of the Leningrad Comedy Theater. She was noticed and composers started writing songs especially for her.

Lidia Klement gained fame all over the Soviet Union with songs such as Karelia, Rain on the Neva, and Is All This for Me Alone?. She performed frequently on radio and television, including on the extremely popular musical variety show Goluboy Ogonyok. In 1964, just months before her death, she released a record with 9 songs on it (through Melodiya record label). At 26 years of age, at the peak of her career, she was diagnosed with melanoma and soon died. She leaves behind a daughter, a granddaughter, and a great granddaughter, who live in the United States.

== See also ==
- "Karelia" (song) in the Russian Wikipedia
