= Nikolay Zherikhov =

Nikolay Ivanovich Zherikhov
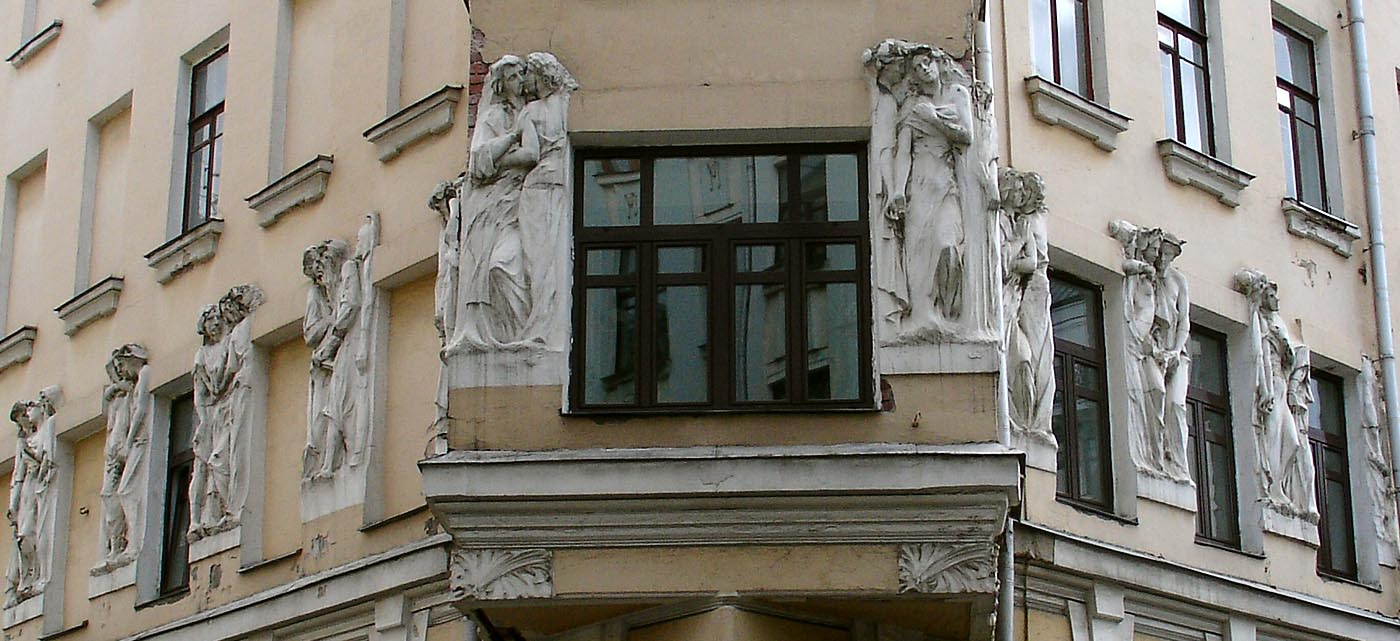
- Brothel on Plotnikov Lane.
- Born: 1870s Moscow
- Died: 5 October 1916 (aged 45–46); Moscow
- Occupation: Architect
- Buildings: Flyorov School, Solovyov Clinic

Nikolay Ivanovich Zherikhov (died October 5, 1916, in Moscow) was a Russian Art Nouveau architect, active in Moscow in 1902–1914. A prolific author of apartment buildings financed by Broido, Wilner and Zaichenko real estate firms, Zherikhov stood out among contemporary architects for his use of decorative sculpture. Zherikhov's buildings are adorned with rows of life-sized figurative sculptures, including one extant case of explicit erotic art at no. 4, Plotnikov Lane.

== Biography ==
=== Early life, career ===
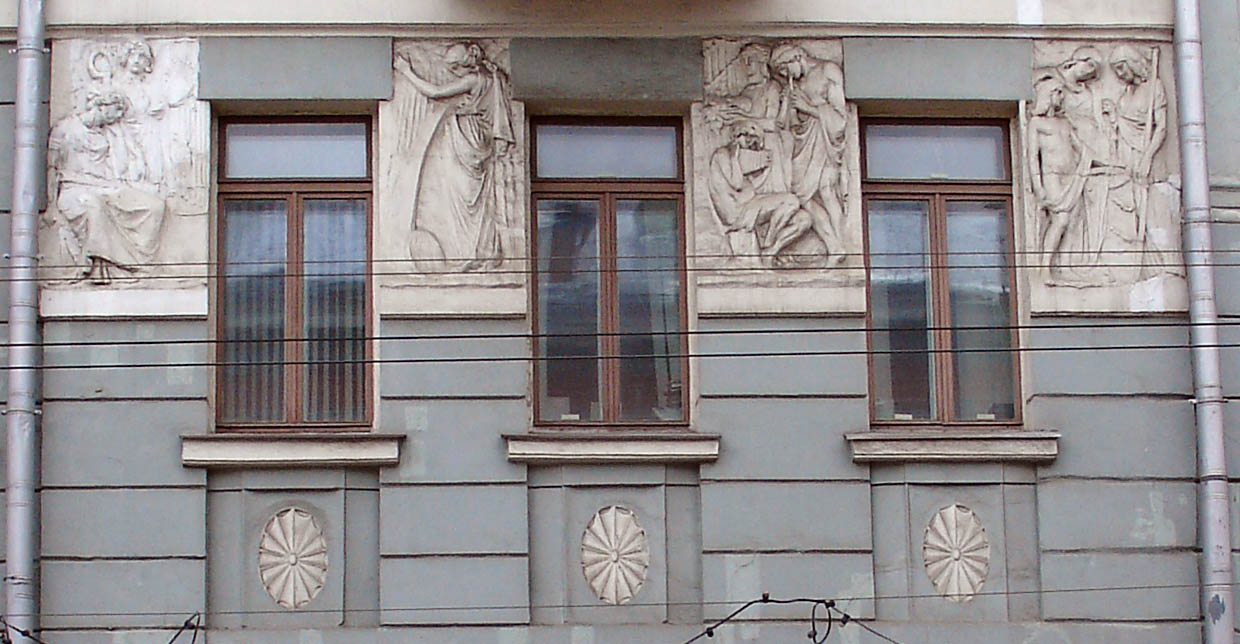
9, Prechistenka Street, Moscow, architect: Nikolai Zherikhov, 1900s

Nikolay Zherikhov was born in a poor peasant family in Mahilyow area; exact date of his birth (1870s) and his education (probably Stroganov Institute) remain unknown. In 1897–1900 Zherikhov worked as drawing and writing teacher in Moscow schools; his first architectural work was made in 1902 for the Broidos, a Jewish family of real estate developers. His two brothers graduated from Moscow School of Painting, Sculpture and Architecture; they collaborated with Nikolay but did not leave a notable contribution of their own.

Zherikhov himself never participated in public professional disputes; his name and works were neglected by the press. His road to success remains a mystery; Zherikhov, once an ordinary teacher, instantly became a fashionable architect and authored over 50 buildings in affluent districts of Moscow in twelve years of his short career. A prolific author of apartment buildings financed by Broido, Wilner and Zaichenko real estate firms, Zherikhov stood out among contemporary architects for his use of decorative sculpture.

=== Style, works ===
His use of sculpture has been linked to the legacy of Stroganov Institute school that focused on elaborate facade decorations. However, none of contemporary architects used sculpture so frequently and on such scale as Zherikhov. His best known work, a small 4-story apartment building on the corner of Plotnikov and Maly Mogiltsevsky Lane, completed in 1907, features a band of 40 life-sized figures arranged in groups of two or three in explicitly erotic settings. Three of the satyrs resemble Leo Tolstoy, Alexander Pushkin and Nikolay Gogol. The name of the sculptor has been lost; perhaps it was Leeb Sinayev, author of Pushkin Museum friezes, or one of his disciples. Tourist guides say that the building once housed a high-class brothel, but the statement is refuted by historians as an urban legend.

Zherikhov, like contemporary Gesamtkunstwerk architects, practiced application of the exterior style to building interiors, including individual apartment units. Around 1910, following the trend of the time, he switched to Russian neoclassical revival; his best known example of the period is the Flyorov School, now a college of Moscow Conservatory, in Merzlyakovsky Lane. Here the sculpture follows the classical Roman canon. Like many Art Nouveau architects of his period he also practised earlier Victorian architecture, evident in his 1914 Solovyov Clinic on present-day New Arbat Street.

Buildings

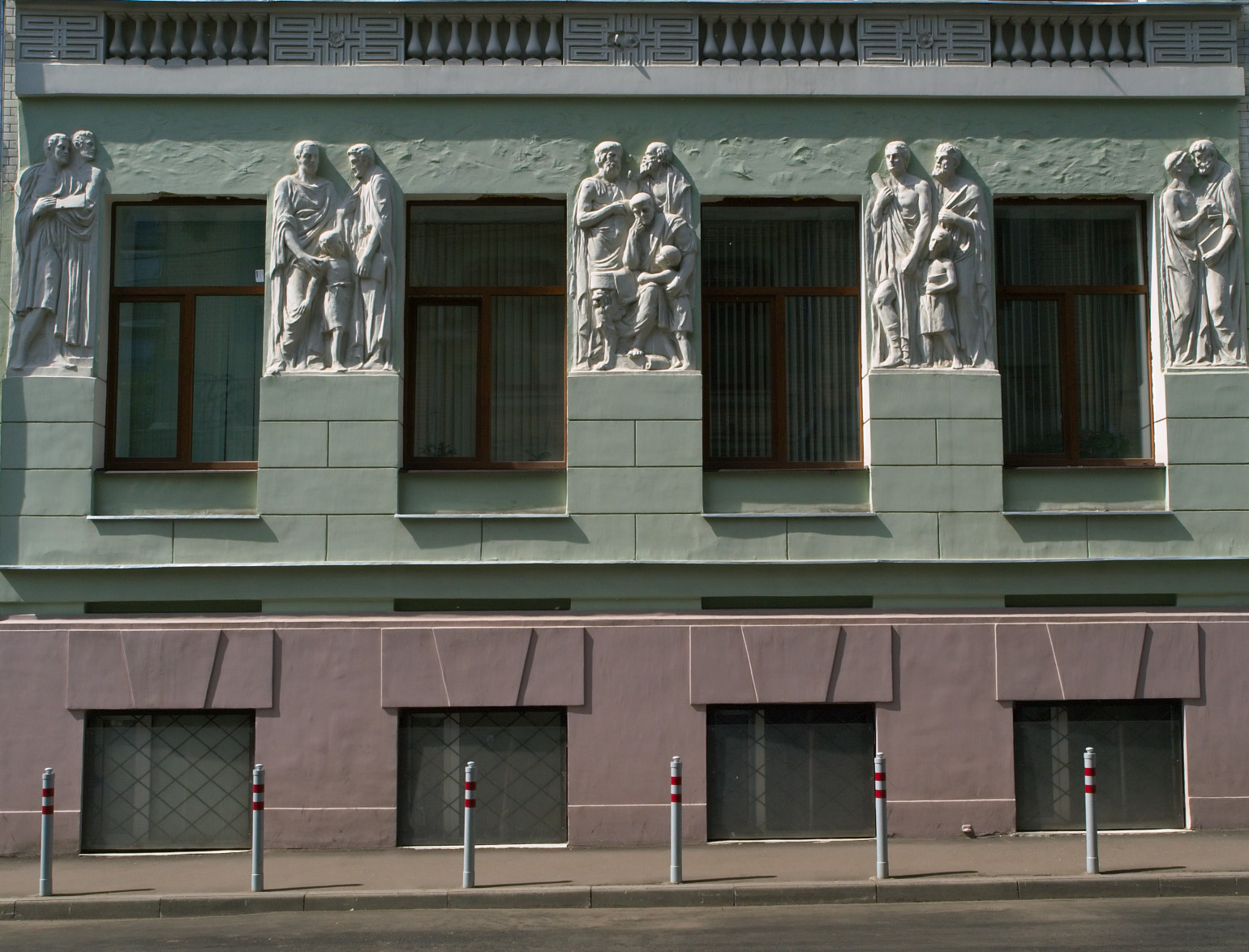
School in Merzlyakovsky Lane.

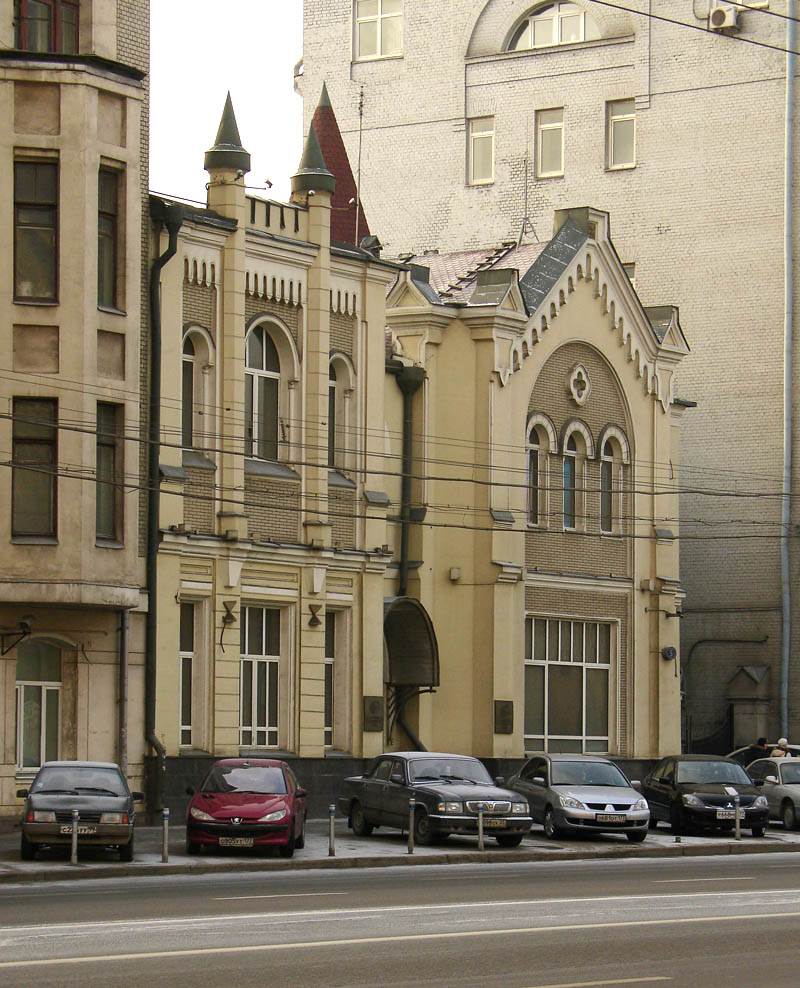
Moscow, Novy Arbat 5

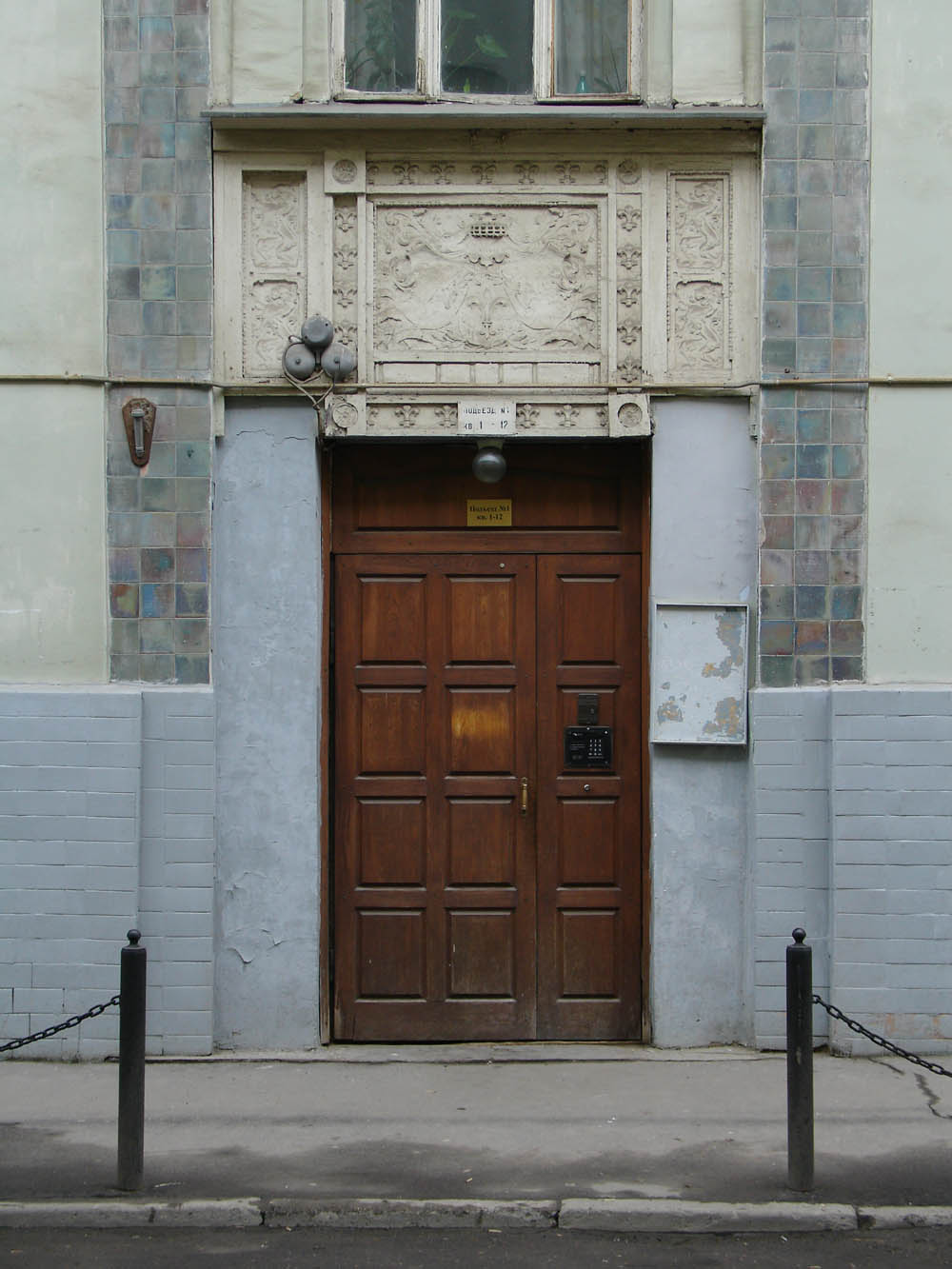
Maly; Mogiltsevsky; Lane, Zherikhov, 1900s

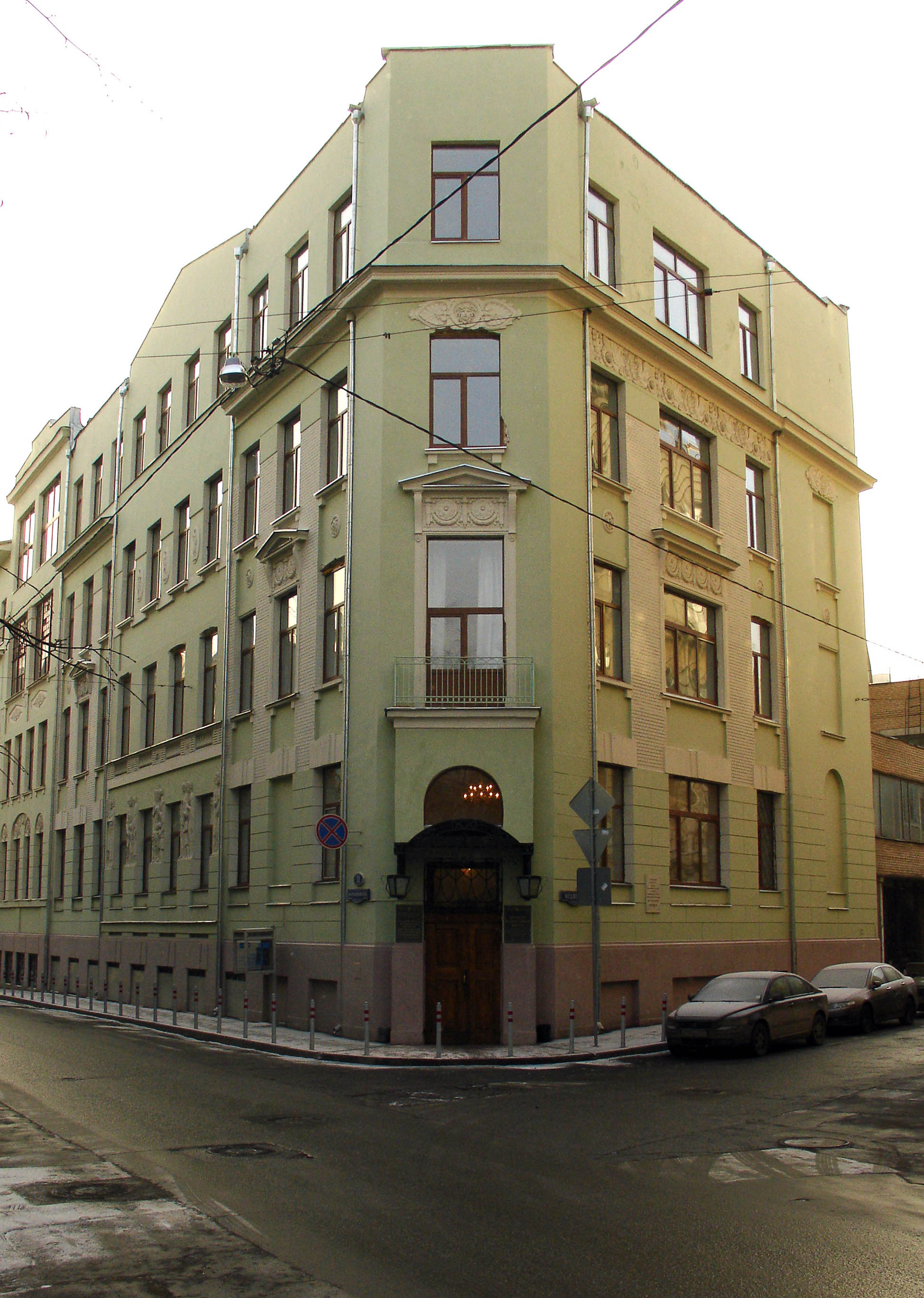
Merzlyakovsky Lane, Moscow. Musical college

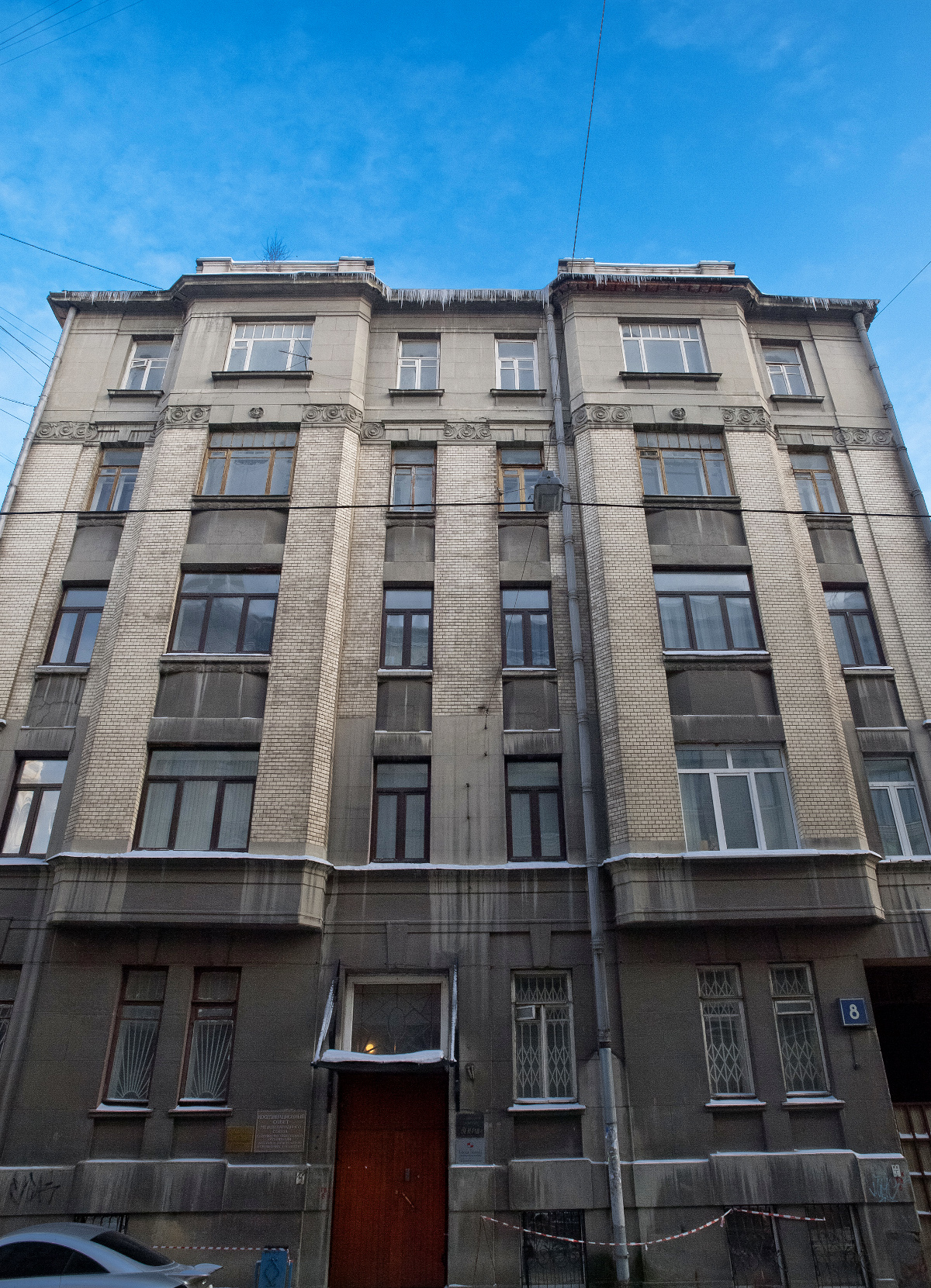
Moscow, Schepkina, 1913. Zherikhov

=== Death ===
The architect died in his forties, in 1916, and was buried at Vagankovo Cemetery.

== Gallery ==
Plotnikov Lane building

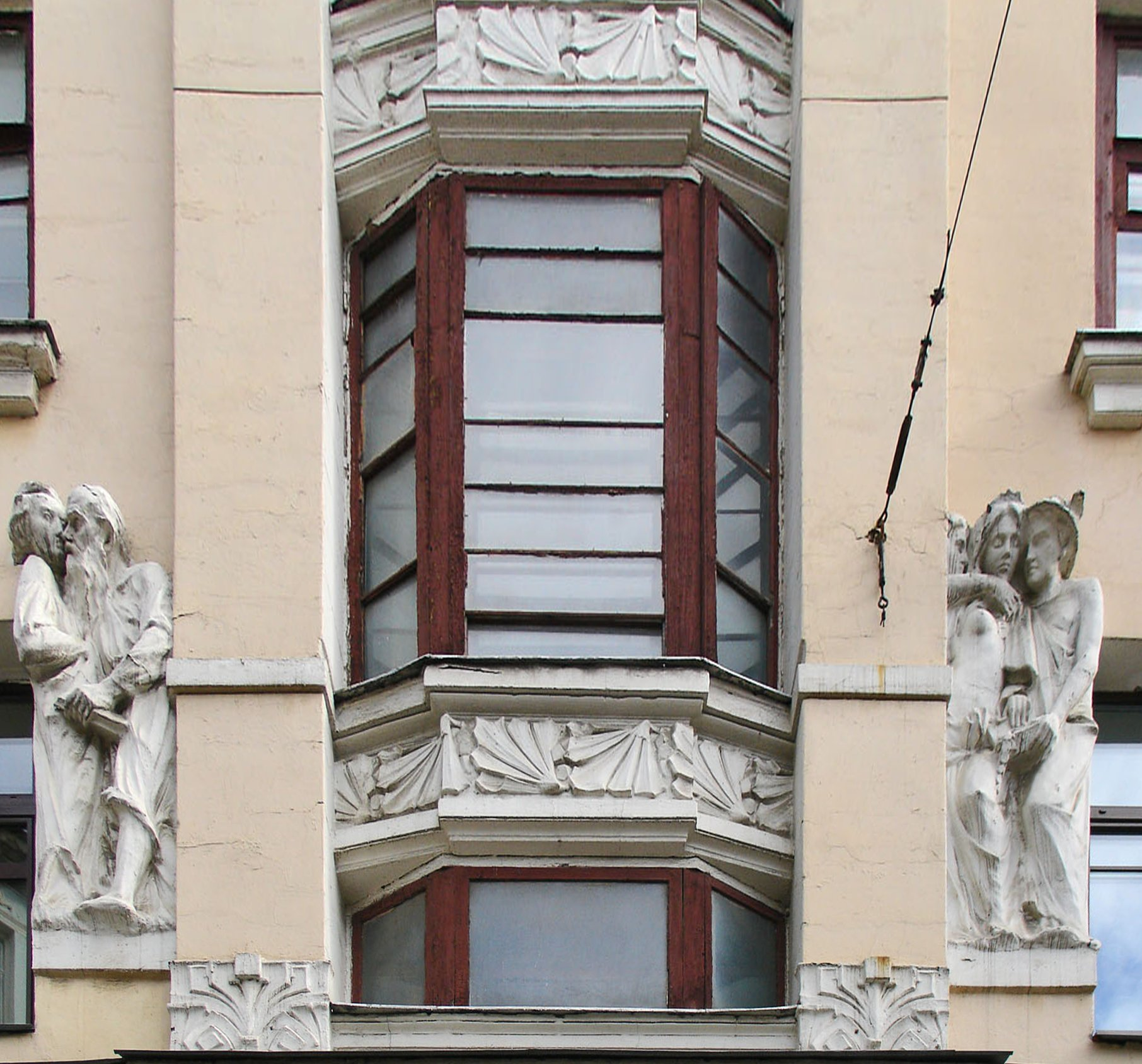
Alexander Pushkin, Leo Tolstoy on left.

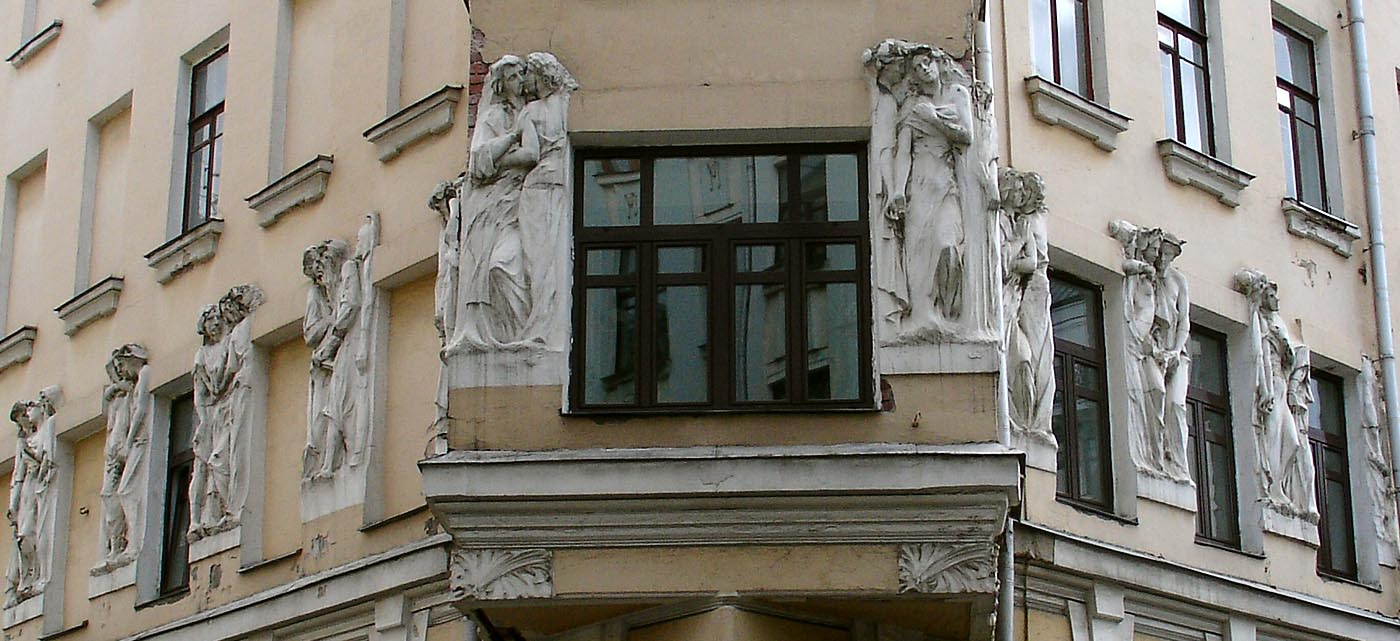

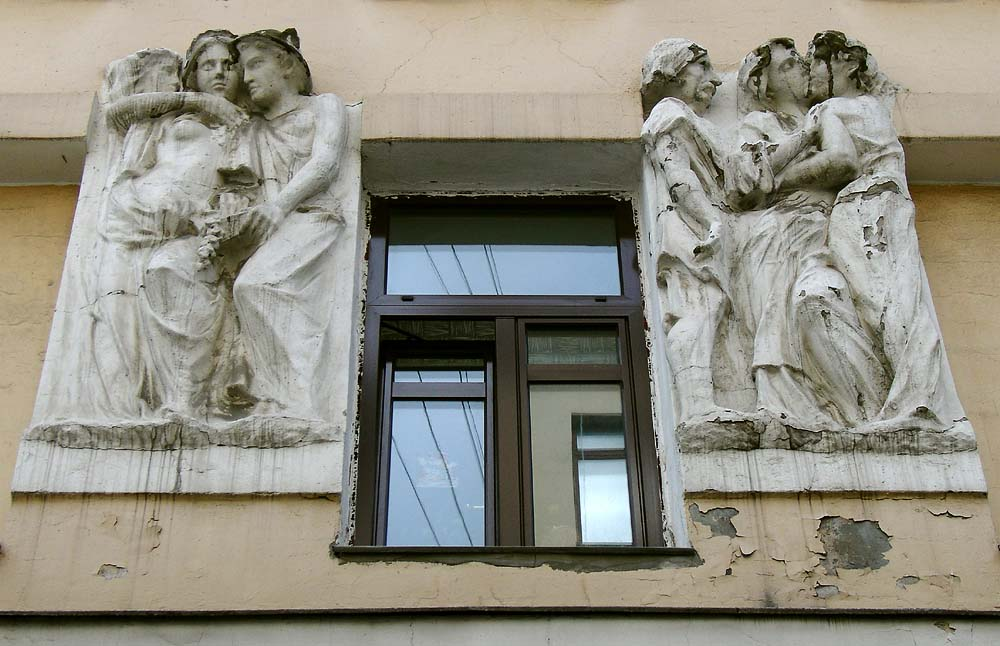
Nikolay Gogol, 3rd from right

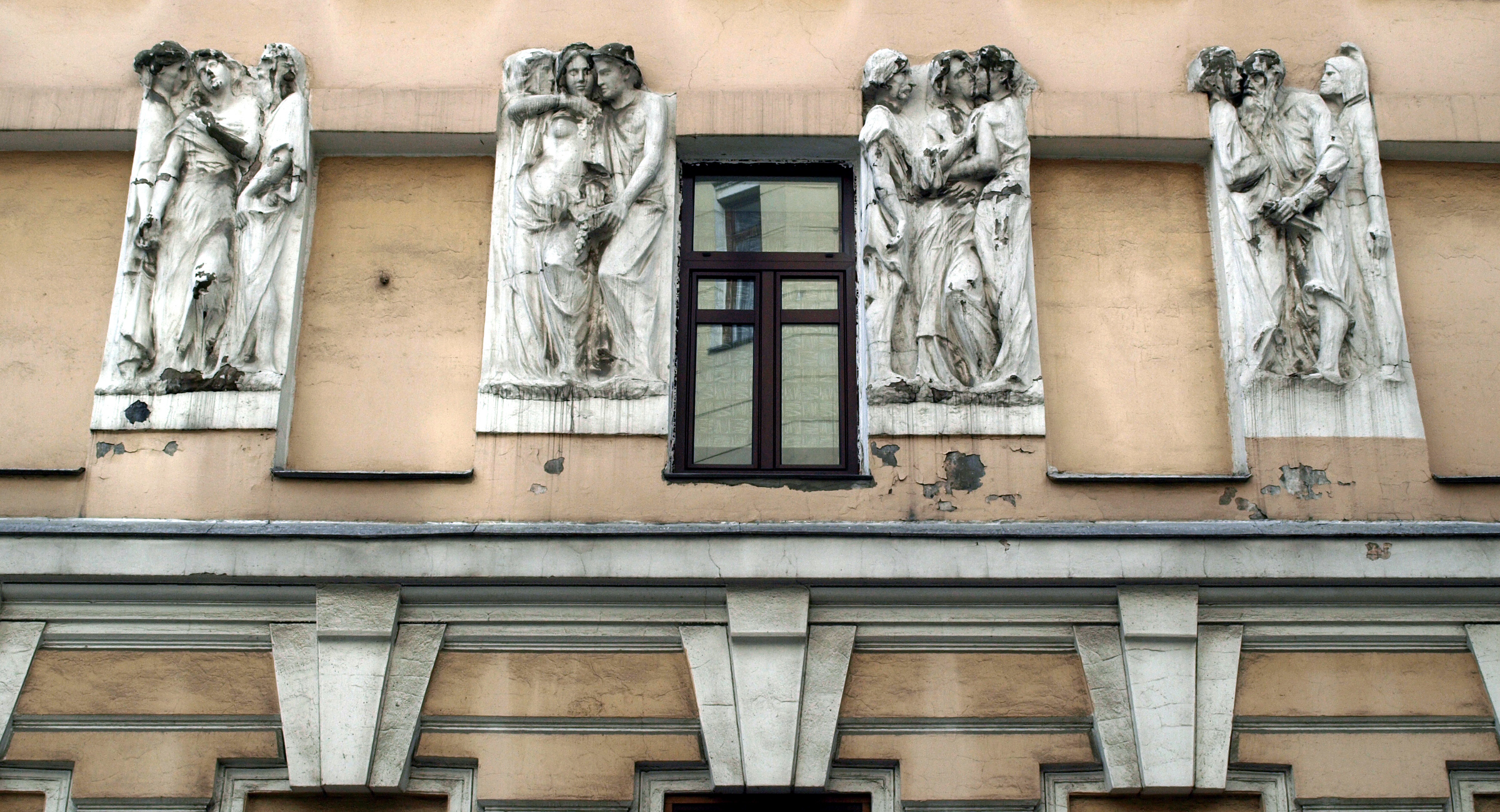
Exterior

Plotnikov Lane exterior statues

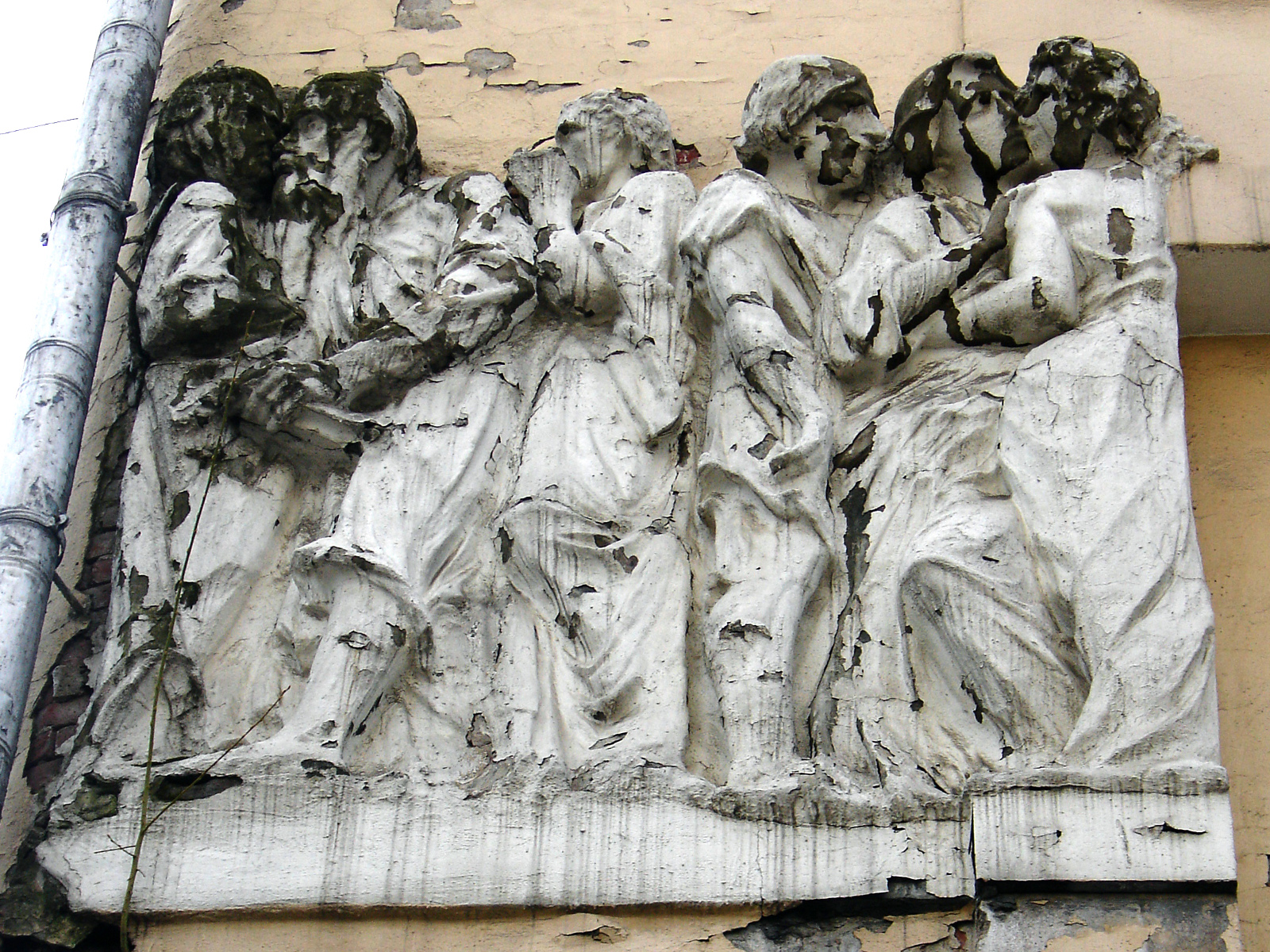

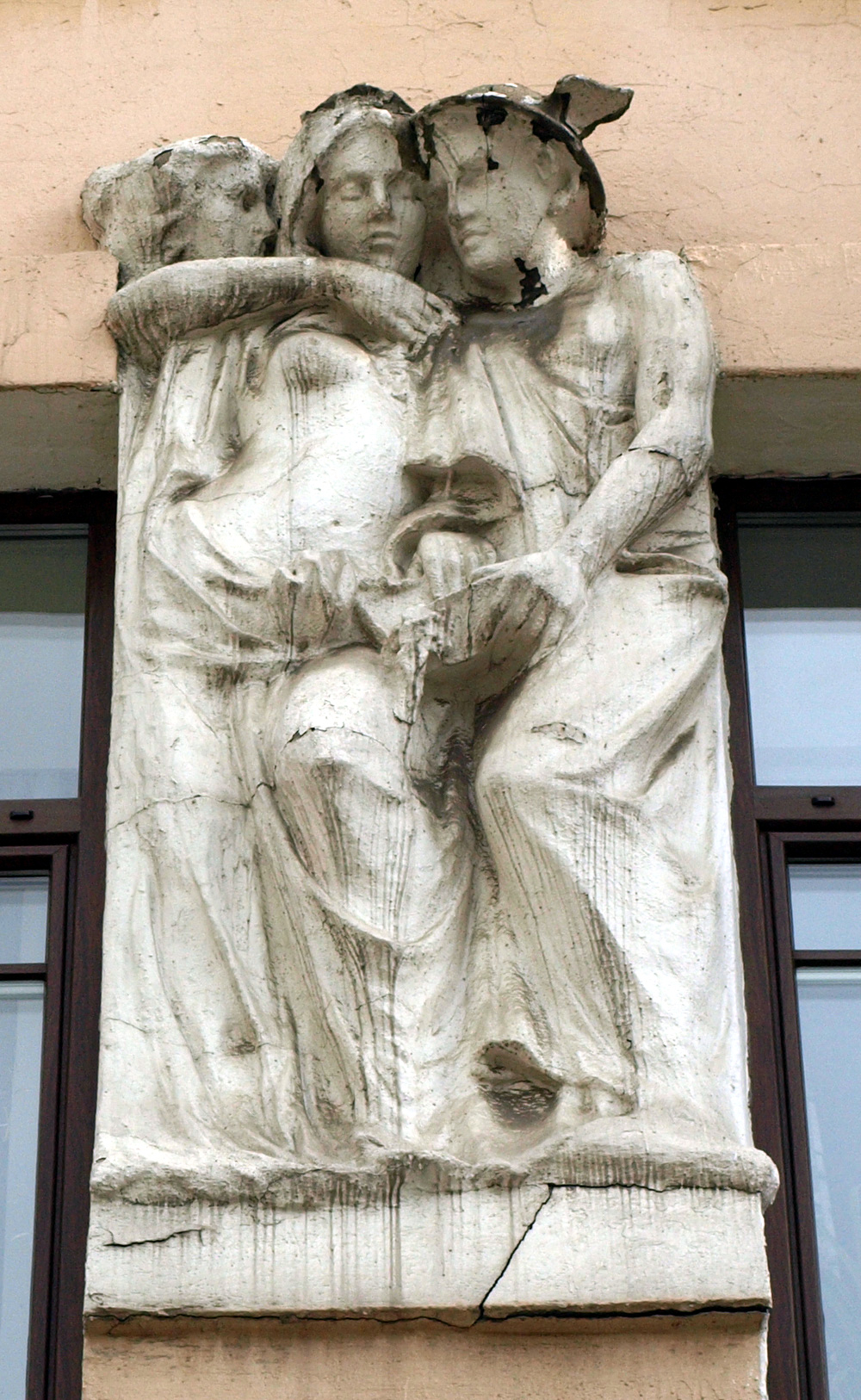

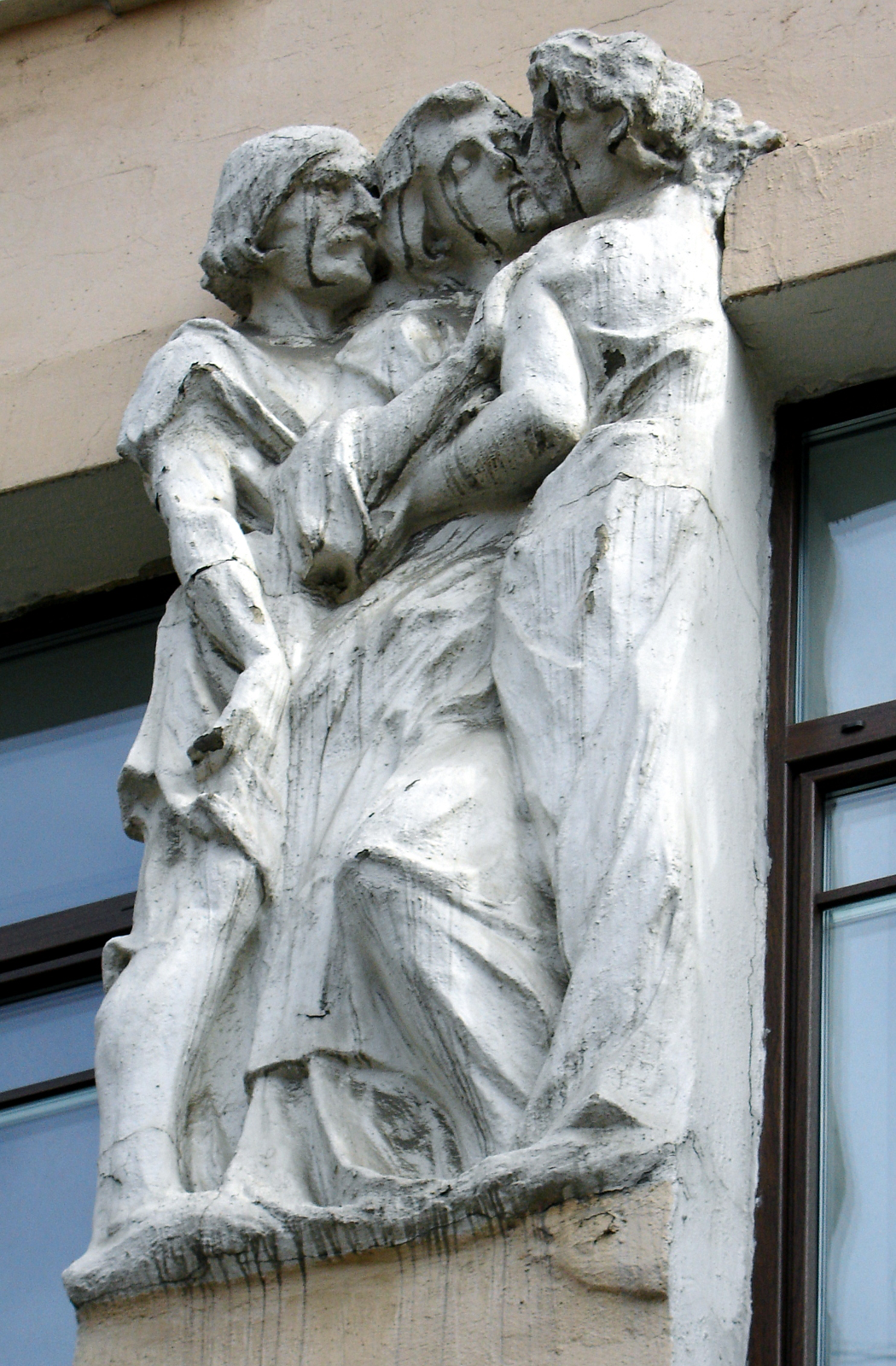

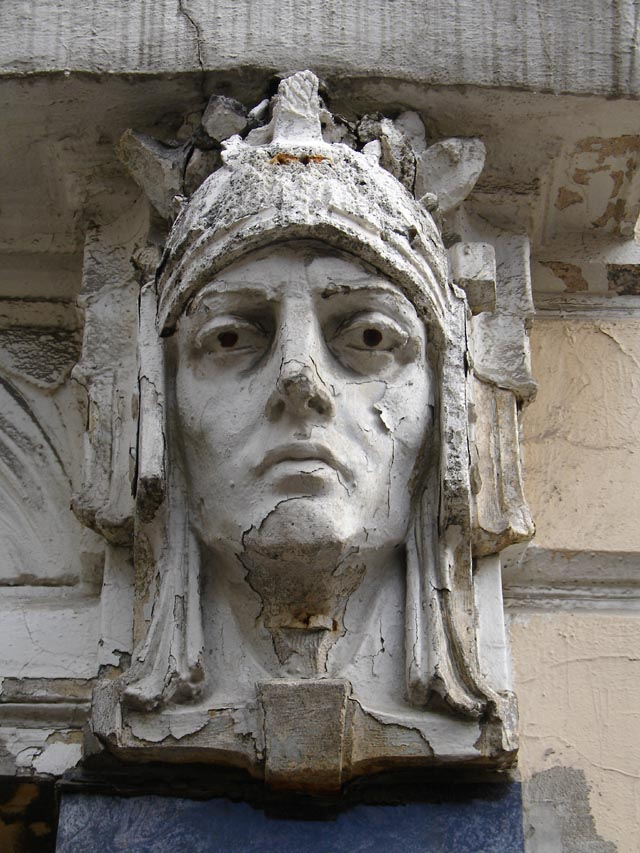
