= Vyacheslav Oltarzhevsky =

Russian architect (1880–1966)

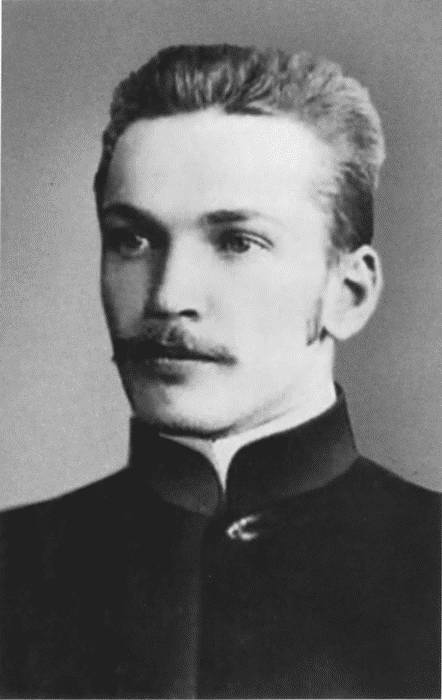
- Born: 17 March 1880; Moscow, Moscow Governorate, Russian Empire
- Died: 24 April 1966 (aged 86); Moscow, Russian SFSR, Soviet Union
- Occupation: Architect
- Awards: Stalin Prize (1948)
- Buildings: Hotel Ukraina (with Arkady Mordvinov, 1947–1957)
- Projects: Skyscraper Construction in Moscow encyclopaedic edition

Vyacheslav Konstantinovich Oltarzhevsky (Russian: Вячеслав Константинович Олтаржевский, 17 March 1880 – 24 April 1966) was a Russian and Soviet architect. He was one of the first Soviet experts in skyscraper construction, notable for his collaboration with Arkady Mordvinov on Hotel Ukraina (Moscow). Oltarzhevsky, one of the few architects hit by the Great Purge in 1938, survived it and returned to active practice in 1940s.

== Biography ==
Vyacheslav Oltarzhevsky was born in a family of a government official in Moscow. He studied architecture at Moscow School of Painting, Sculpture and Architecture (1901–1908) and in Vienna under Otto Wagner (1905). He assisted older architects Ivan Rerberg, Illarion Ivanov-Shitz and Marian Peretyatkovich, and completed his first independent commission in 1909. His most visible building before World War I was the Northern Insurance in Kitai-gorod (shared with Rerberg and Peretyatkovich).

In 1924–1934, Oltarzhevsky lived in United States with an official mission to study and evaluate modern construction technology, becoming the leading Soviet expert in highrise steel frame construction.

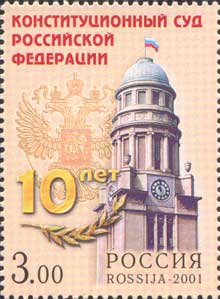
Northern Insurance Society (1909-1911, Moscow). Architects: Marian Peretyatkovich, architects Ivan Rerberg, Vyacheslav Oltarzhevsky

In 1935, Oltarzhevsky was appointed to be the chief architect of All-Russia Exhibition Centre; in April 1936, his plan was officially approved. By 1938, Oltarzhevsky completed most of this plan, notably the Mechanisatsia stepped tower, a predecessor of late stalinist architecture towers. The fall of Commissar for Agriculture, Mikhail Chernov, arrested in 1938 for Bukharin conspiracy, caused a domino effect in the Commissariat for Agriculture which supervised the Exhibition. Oltarzhevsky was arrested, too, but spared from death penalty and served his term in Vorkuta, as a town architect, until 1943. Meanwhile, his work at the Exhibition was branded alien art; some of his buildings were torn down and rebuilt from scratch.

After World War II, Oltarzhevsky was assigned to the Moscow Skyscraper Project. His own plans were discarded, because all jobs were awarded in advance to most influential Soviet architects. Oltarzhevsky joined Arkady Mordvinov on his Hotel Ukraina skyscraper in Dorogomilovo District; both architects were awarded Stalin Prize in 1948 for conceptual drafts, before actual construction began.

Before Ukraina was completed, Oltarzhevsky compiled his "Skyscraper Construction in Moscow ("Строительство высотных зданий в Москве", 1953), which remains a principal information source on late stalinist high-rise project.

== Sources ==
- https://www.oxfordartonline.com/groveart/groveart/abstract/10.1093/gao/9781884446054.001.0001/oao-9781884446054-e-7000063520
