= Gavriil Baranovsky =

Russian architect (1860–1920)

Gavriil Vasilyevich Baranovsky
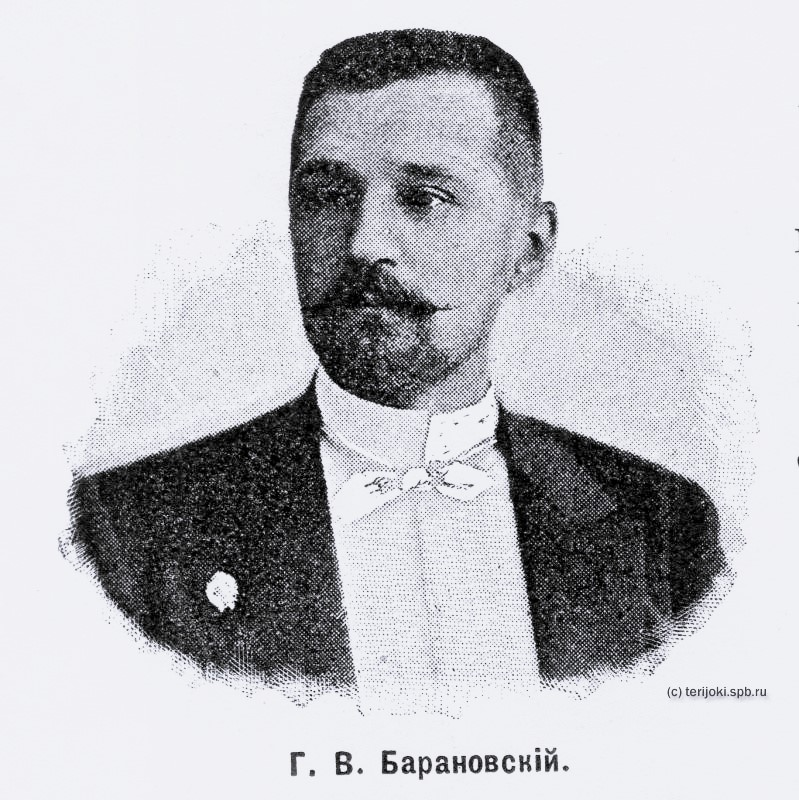
- Born: 6 April [O.S. 25 March] 1860; Odessa, Kherson Governorate, Russian Empire
- Died: June 20, 1920 (aged 60); Kellomäki, Finland
- Occupation: Architect
- Buildings: Elisseeff Buildings, Saint Petersburg
- Projects: First town plan for Murmansk, 1917

Gavriil Vasilyevich Baranovsky, also Baranovskii (Russian: Гавриил Васильевич Барановский; 6 April [O.S. 25 March] 1860 – 28 June 1920) was a Russian architect, civil engineer, art historian and publisher, who worked primarily in Saint Petersburg for the Elisseeff family, but also practiced in Moscow and produced the first town plan for Murmansk (then Romanov-na-Murmane).

== Biography ==
=== Education and early career ===
He was born in Odessa to attorney Vasili Ivanovitš Baranovsky and his wife Rosalia Malinovska Gavriil Baranovsky. Baranovsky trained at Saint Petersburg Institute of Civil Engineers (1881–1886), graduating with an honorary silver medal. He began his architectural career as an assistant to Paul Susor (Pavel Susor) between 1883 and 1885. His first commission was a state-financed Main Palace Chancellery (Главная дворцовая канцелярия); in 1885-1888, Baranovsky worked on numerous apartment buildings in Saint Petersburg. After 1888 he became staff architect for the Baltic Shipyards.

=== Architect to the Elisseeffs ===
Baranovsky was married to a daughter of Grigory Elisseeff of the Elisseeff (Yeliseyev, Elisseieff) merchant family based in Saint Petersburg, owner of a lot of local real estate. Grigory Elisseeff's apartment building (1889–1890) became Baranovsky's first independent commission as a lead architect. Later, Baranovsky completed various country homes for the Elisseeff family and, most visible of his buildings, an eclectic Elisseeff Emporium on Nevsky Prospect (1900–1903) and its Moscow counterpart, the Elisseeff Store on Tverskaya Street (1898–1901, with Marian Peretyatkovich). In 1898 Baranovsky was appointed construction manager for all Elisseeff businesses.

Baranovsky's style varied through different shades of eclectics, eventually focusing on Art Nouveau.

=== Public activities ===
In 1891 Baranovsky was appointed to Empress Maria's Office of Charitable Institutions and designed Saint-Petersburg Eye Hospital. He also held various consultancy roles with other state institutions. More important was his public editorial activity, starting as chief editor of Our Home (Наше Жилище, 1894–1895), later Stroitel (Строитель, 1895–1905) magazine. Baranovsky promoted and edited the "Architectural Encyclopaedia of the Second Half of 19th century" ("Архитектурная энциклопедия второй половины XIX века") in seven volumes. It was then considered to be the most complete Russian reference on contemporary architecture of the world.

According to St. Petersburg Fragments (Петербург - фрагменты) Biographical section, the aging architect died in 1920 from starvation that followed the Russian Revolution of 1917 and the Russian Civil War. Baranovskys son Wassilij (d. 1945) immigrated to Sweden. He was pianist and composer and made several recordings in his new homeland. He was married with violinist Nora Duesberg.

== Buildings ==
=== Saint Petersburg and suburbs ===
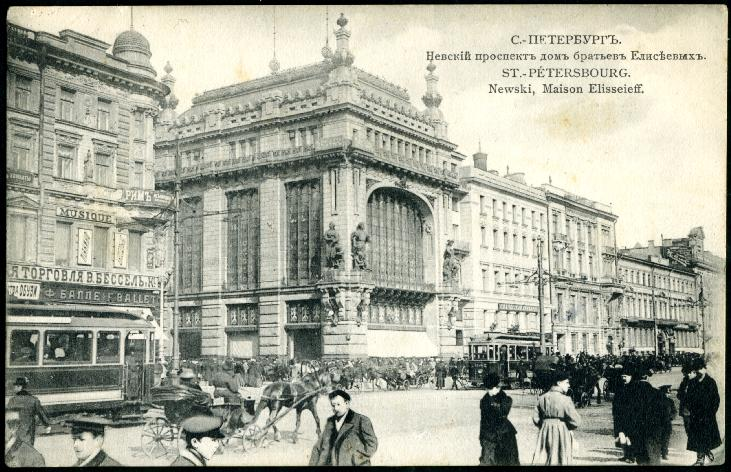
Elisseeff Emporium, 56 Nevsky Prospect

- 1880s - Baltic Shipyard workshops, St. Petersburg, 1880, assistant to Ernest Gibert (1823–1909)
- 1885-1888 Apartment buildings: 20, Shirokaya Street; 7th line of Vasilyevsky Island, etc.
- 1888 Elisseeff building expansion, 18 Birzhevaya Linia; 1900-1903 further rebuild
- 1887 Smolenka River bridge, Goloday Island Railroad
- 1889-1890 Elisseeff apartment building, 64 Fontanka Embankment
- 1889-1892 Elisseeff apartment building, 14 Lomonosova Street; repairs and expansion, 12 Lomonosova Street
- 1892 Grigory Elisseeff House, Birzhevaya Linia
- 1897-1898 Own rental apartment building, 36 Dostoyevskogo Street
- 1899-1900 Princess Obolenskaya School for the Girls, 8 Baskov Lane
- 1900-1903 Elisseeff Emporium, 56 Nevsky Prospect; 1906 rebuild of adjacent buildings
- 1907-1909 Russian Geographical Society, 10 Grivtsova Lane
- 1908 Shuvalov apartment building, Knyagininskaya Street
- 1909 Pawn Shop, 72 Moika Embankment
- 1909-1910 Dorzhiev House, 93 Primorsky Prospect
- 1909-1915 Buddhist Temple, 91 Primorsky Prospect

=== Moscow ===
- 1899-1901 Elisseeff Store, 14 Tverskaya Street with Marian Peretyatkovich and Vladimir Voeykov
- 1905 Elisseeff apartment building, 1 Kozitsky Lane, with Vladimir Voeykov

=== Elsewhere ===
- 1897-1899 Elisseeff Estate and Park (Oru Palace), Toila-Oru, Estonia (destroyed)
- 1917 Town plan for Romanov-na-Murmane settlement (present-day Murmansk)

== Sources ==
- Russian: Архитекторы-строители Петербурга-Петрограда начала XX века. Каталог выставки. Л., 1982; Барановский, с. 21-22 (Architects and builders of St. Petersburg and Petrograd at the beginning of 20th century. Exhibition catalogue. Leningrad, 1982, pp. 21–22)
- Russian: Кириков Б.М., Федоров С.Г. Зодчий-энциклопедист (Г.В.Барановский). Ленинградская панорама, 1985, N 2 (B.M. Kirikov and S.G. Federov - Gavriil Baranovskii, Architect-Encyclopedist, Leningrad Panorama, No. 2, 1985)
- Russian: Нащокина, Мария, "Архитекторы московского модерна", М, "Жираф", 2005, с. 62-66 (Maria Naschokina, Architect of Moscow Moderne, M, 2005, pp. 63–66)
- Gabriel Baranovsky: Världssubstanssen och dess härledning, sammanfattat och utgivet av Wassilij Baranovsky, Lund 1921
