= Eliseyev Emporium (Saint Petersburg) =

Architectural structure in Saint Petersburg, Russia

Elisseeff Emporium
- Russian: Елисеевский магазин
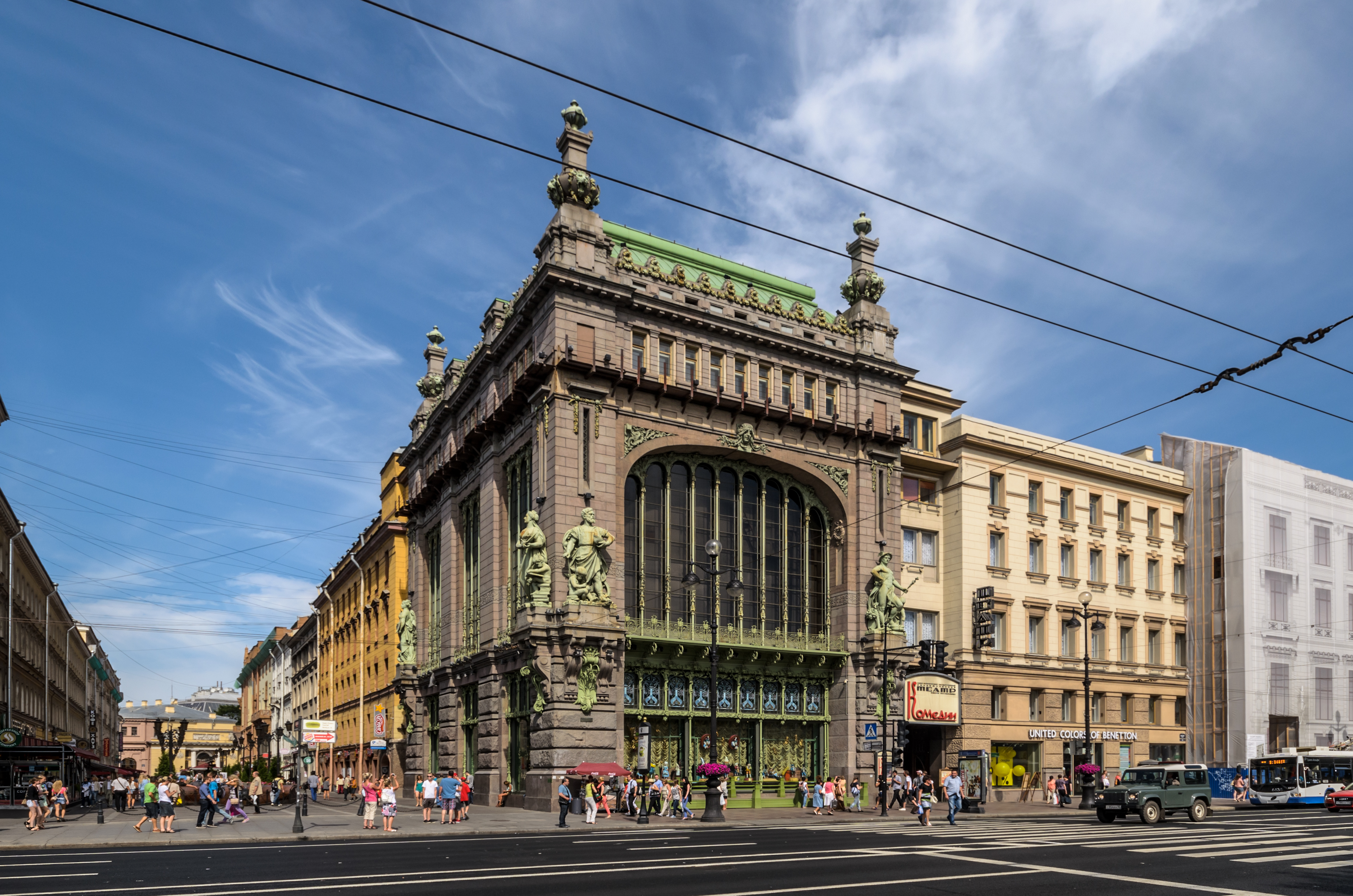
- Eliseevsky Shop in 2013
- Interactive map of the Elisseeff Emporium area

General information
- Type: Shopping mall
- Architectural style: Art Nouveau
- Location: St. Petersburg, Russia, 56, Nevsky Prospekt; 8, Malaya Sadovaya Street
- Coordinates: 59°56′03″N 30°20′15″E
- Current tenants: Public limited company "Eliseyev Emporium"
- Construction started: 1902
- Completed: 1903
- Inaugurated: 1903
- Client: Saint Petersburg City Administration
- Owner: Committee for the Management of City Property of Saint Petersburg City Administration
- Landlord: Saint Petersburg City Administration

Technical details
- Structural system: Brickwork and Glass
- Floor count: 5

Design and construction
- Architect: Gabriel Baranovskii

Elisseeff Emporium in St. Petersburg is a large retail and entertainment complex, including a famous food hall, constructed in 1902–1903 for the Elisseeff Brothers. Located at 56 Nevsky Prospekt, the complex consists of three buildings, although the corner one is the structure that is referred to as Elisseeff's store or shop (Елисеевский магазин). Designed by architect Gabriel Baranovskii (Baranovsky, Baranowski, Гавриил Васильевич Барановский), it is one of the most striking examples of St. Petersburg Art Nouveau architecture, although at the time of its construction the building was considered controversial.

== History ==
=== Attempt on Alexander II's life ===
A restaurant formerly stood at the site. In 1881, revolutionary Narodniks built a tunnel under Malaya Sadovaya Street from the basement of that building, preparing to plant mines to assassinate Czar Alexander II. By 1 March the preparations were complete, but the Czar did not pass that way on that day (and was instead killed by other means).

=== Present building ===
The present building was constructed 1902–1903. Before the revolution of 1917, the shop was under the control of the Elisseeff Brothers merchants. From 1917 to the 1990s, the shop was operated by a state company. It was known as Gastronom No. 1. during this period.

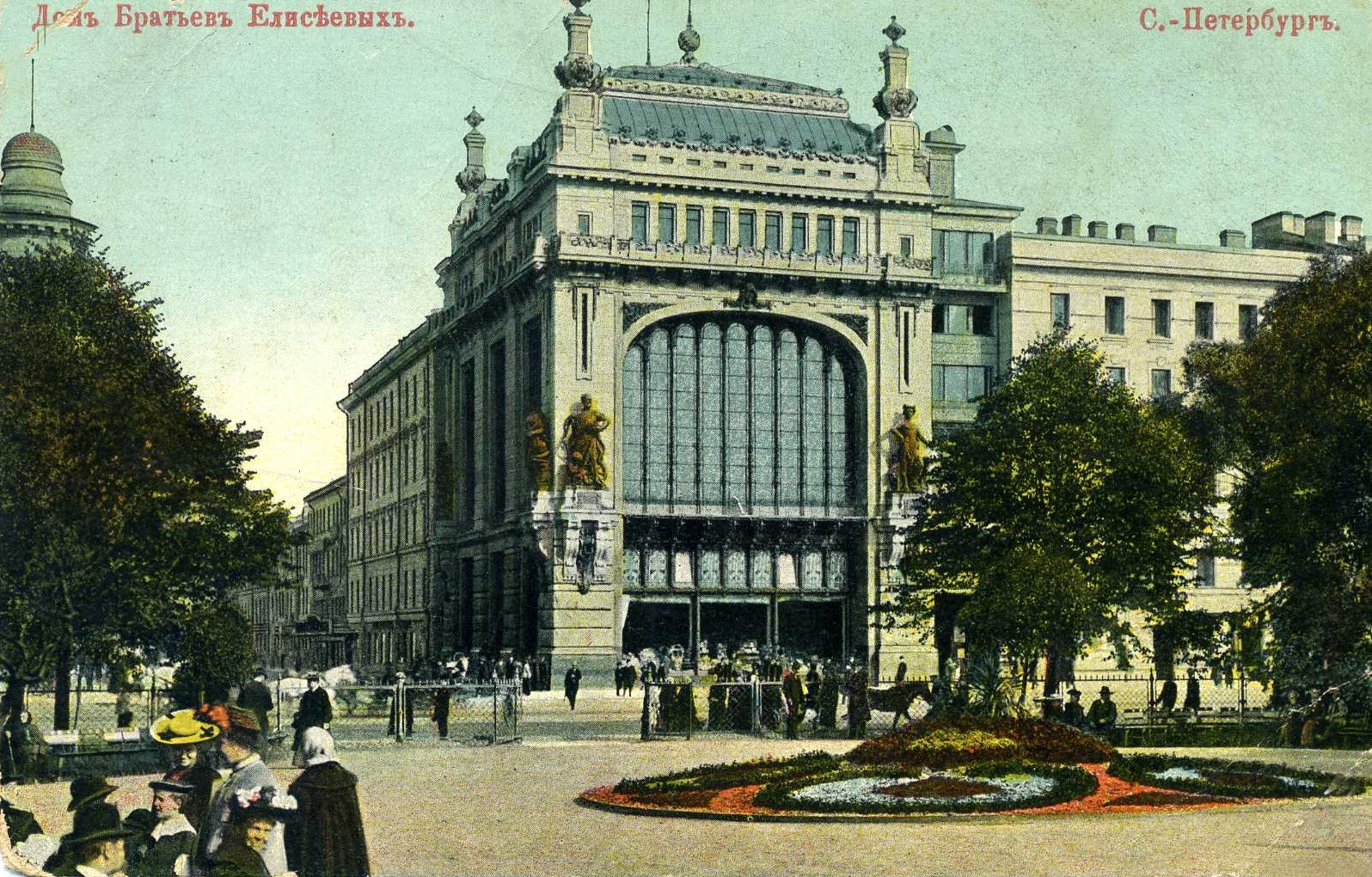
Elisseeff Emporium around 1904. Contemporary postcard

In the mid-1990s, the shop was operated by a public limited company called "Eliseevsky shop". The holding company "Parnas-M" which was owner received in 1995 the right to receive the rent of the trading floor for 49 years.

On 29 July 2002, the company "Eliseevsky shop" declared its intention to lease part of the trading house. The company intended to lease 2,200 square metres, the rent was estimated to be $1 million, but privatisation has not been completed.

In the autumn of 2005 "Parnas M" declared the intention to sell a lease of the Eliseevsky shop to "Arbat-prestige" a Moscow perfumery network. "Arbat-prestige" was to have been in the main trading floor with an area of 900 square metres to sell its perfumery goods. The Elisseeff Emporium would have become the leader of its St. Petersburg network. The shop cost was estimated to be $10 million, and the total cost of all investments towards the project of development of an "Arbat-prestige" network were estimated to be $80 million. The idea of a reshaping the most known delicatessen in the city to a perfumery shop has caused negative reaction of society. The Saint Petersburg City Administration has actually put in a veto for the transaction.

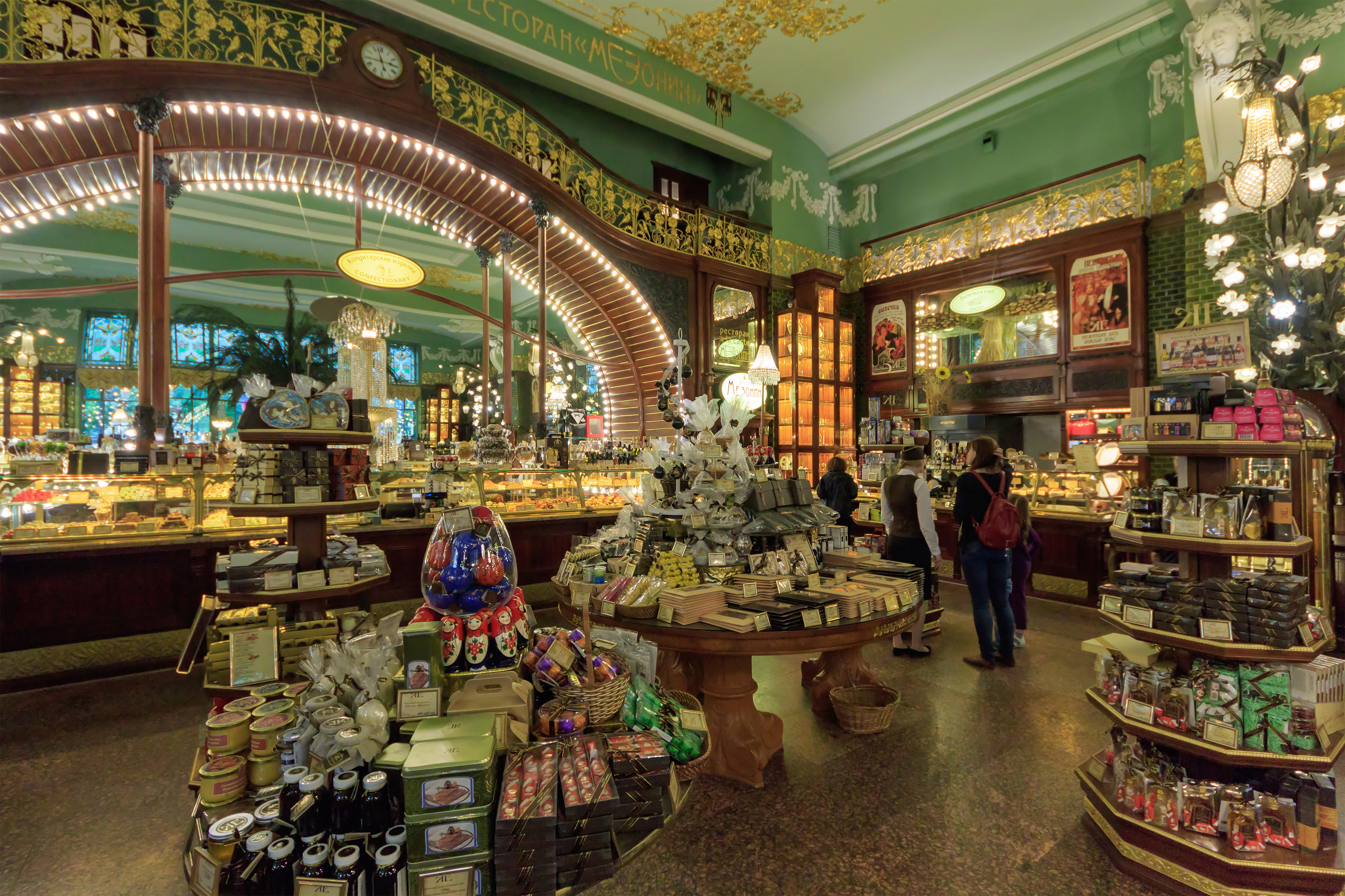
The store's interior after restoration work, 2017.

In February 2006, owners "Parnas M" declared the Eliseevsky shop unprofitable and made the decision to sell a small trading floor to Italian firm "Benetton" on 17 February 2006. In March 2006 "Parnas M" and the city administration managed to agree to a partial reshaping of the activity of the shop. The shop was supposed to divide delicacies into zones in which expensive alcoholic drinks would be on sale, and in one of the zones a cafe was planned.

On 15 January 2007, the shop was closed for half a year for major repairs. An agreement was signed with the city that upon termination of repair work in a building the delicatessen will open again. Works are still being conducted, they are carried out by company IBGroup which carefully restores building interiors under supervision KGIOP.

In July 2009, eviction of "Eliseevsky shop" company from a building on Nevsky Prospekt was considered in a court case. The Committee for the Management of City Property of Saint Petersburg City Administration took action against the "Eliseevsky shop" company because of serious debts on a rent. Consideration has been postponed for the beginning of October in connection with necessity of gathering by the parties of additional documents.

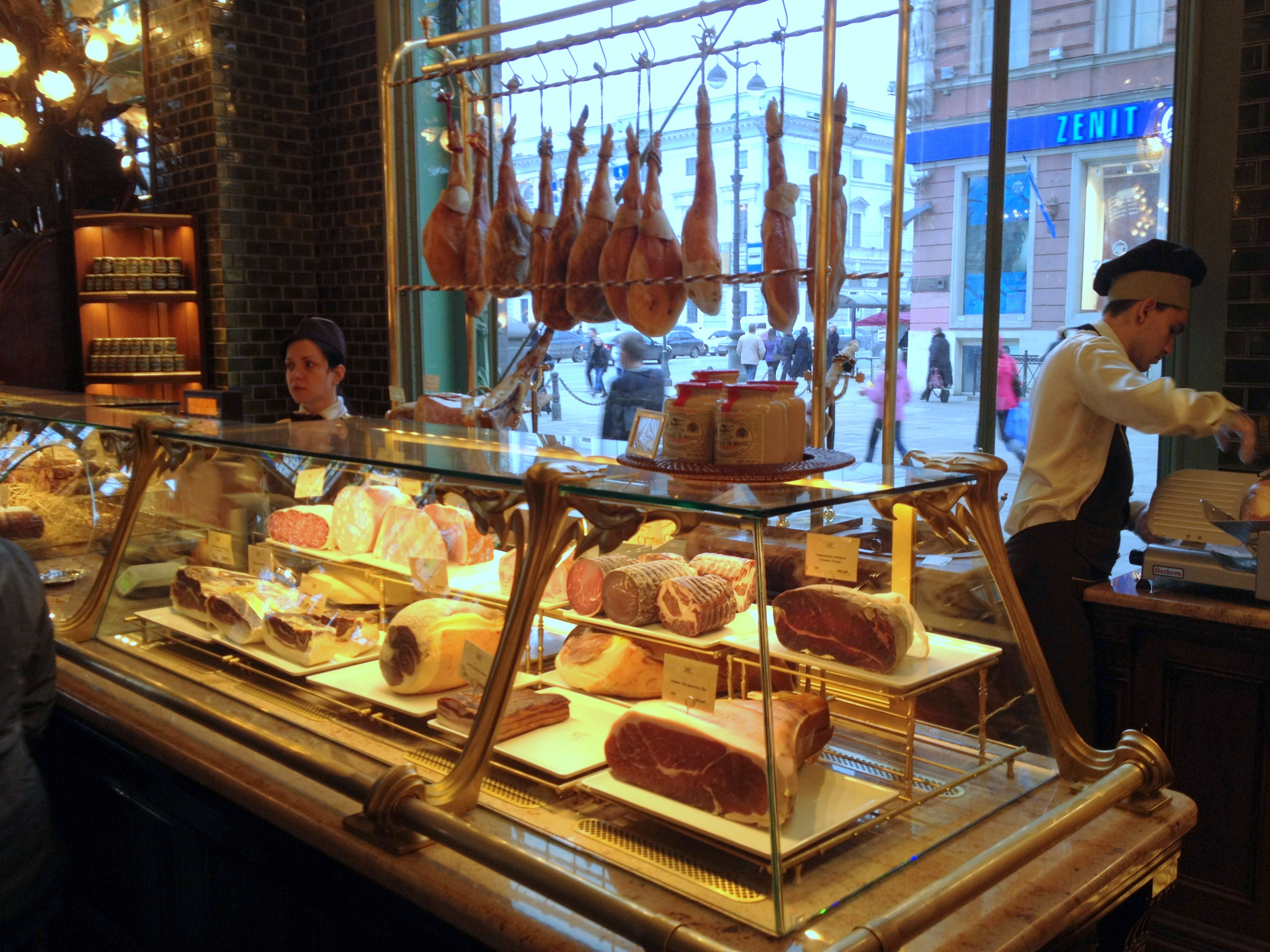
The store's boucherie in 2012.

Interest in the building has been shown by the owner of restaurants in Moscow and St. Petersburg – the company Ginza Projekt; it has plans to restore the building into an elite grocery shop.

The store, after a long period of restoration and refitting, reopened to the public on 8 March 2012. Queues to enter the building stretched out onto Nevsky Prospekt.

The shop is now called Kupetz Eliseevs Food Hall and under its current management it has been restored to its former glory to the finest of details. The food hall preserves the original 7 departments, including 33 meters of display counters of loose produce and exquisite delicacies varying from modern French patisserie, bakery, cheese, charcuterie, smoked salmon, caviar wines & spirits and tea & coffee. The largest display is dedicated to confectionery and home-made patisserie including classic macaroons. To complement the fresh food displays, 12 mobile etageres hold over 3,000 varieties of exclusive products. Each department is beautifully decorated with gilded stucco ceilings and glitzy chandeliers and many of the original features and equipment used in its golden era!

The interior of the mezzanine restaurant, inspired by the architecture of the main Food Hall, has many unique features, such as the hand-finished floral cornices. The bourgeois atmosphere pervade in the restaurant into the smallest of details: from the own label porcelain, through to the gold leaf glasses.

In the basement, the brasserie is decorated in Art Nouveau style. Custom made chairs and sofas have been upholstered with the finest fabrics. Enamel tables with old Russian names and pictures of produce recreate the atmosphere of the beginning of the 20th century. The hand painted wall pattern is in harmony with the original features of walls and ceilings of the famous old basement warehouses.

On the ground floor, the coffee shop spreads from the extensive ornate food vitrines of mouth watering desserts to the retro style red sofas located under a gigantic tropical palm tree. Freshly ground coffee and world teas are prepared to your taste with homemade viennoiserie and cakes served as the perfect accompaniment.

The branding of the new Kupetz Eliseevs Food Hall, was initiated by the current owners and Rui Miguel De Sousa, general manager, who have done extensive research to preserve and reintroduce the ambience of the early 20th century into a modern retail environment. With over 180,000 visitors a month the Kupetz Eliseevs Food Hall is set to become one of the key tourist attractions of Saint Petersburg and one of major historical importance within UNESCO World Heritage Site.

=== Name ===
Elisseeff or Elisseieff is the spelling favored by Elisseeff family (rus. Елисеев). Alternate spellings are Eliseev, Elyseeff, Eliseyev, Eliseef, Eliseief, Eliseieff, Yeliseyev, Jelissejew and Jelissejew.

== Architecture ==
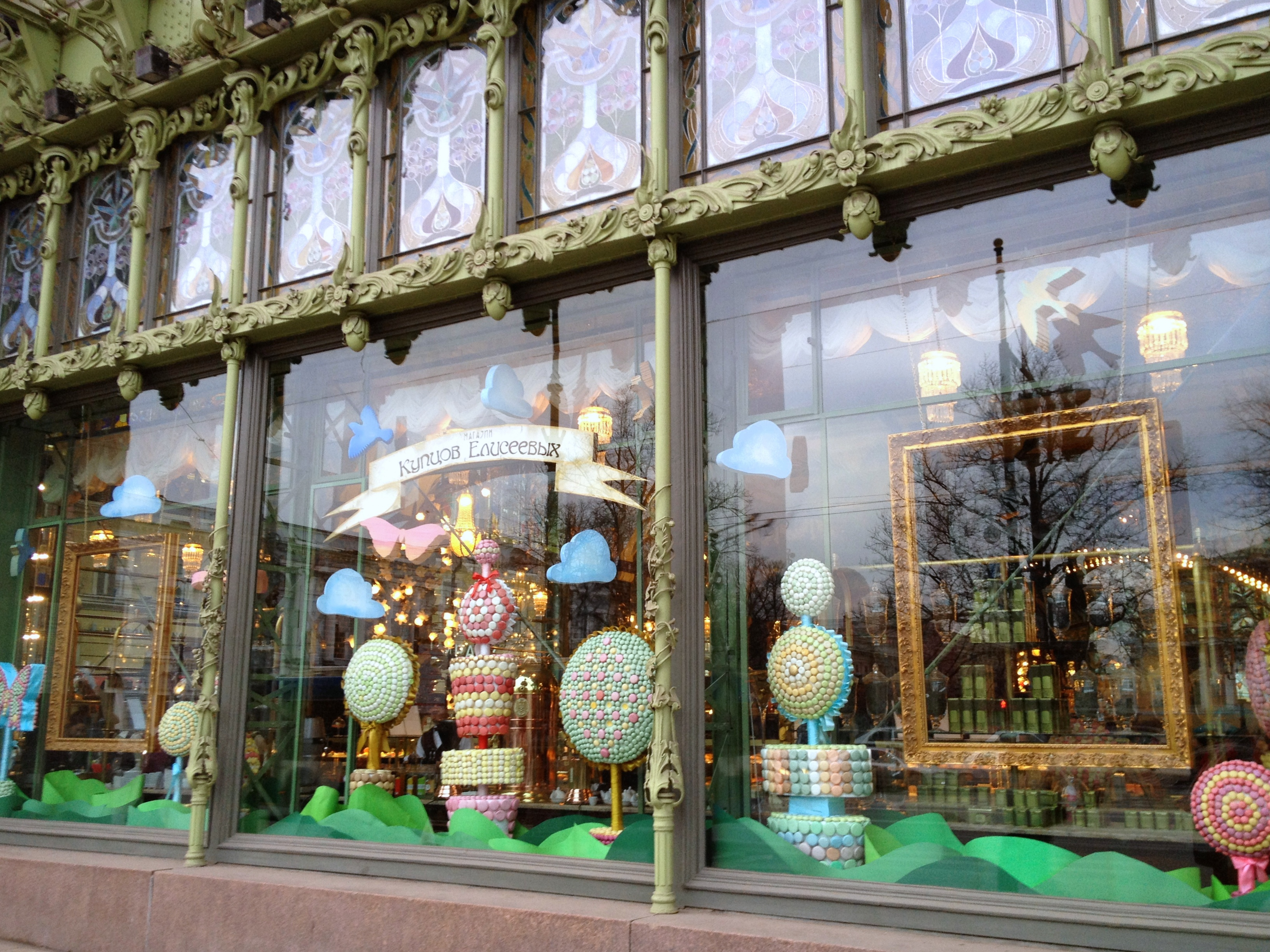
The store front window display of the shop on 30 March 2012.

The architect managed to incorporate some parts of older buildings in this structure, made the entire building appear as if it were one giant shop window. Over one half of the façade consists of a single arch. The arch is a giant stained glass window that opens several floors to the street. The Art Nouveau stained glass contrasts with the granite surface of the building adorned by allegorical sculptures of Commerce, Industry, Science and Arts by Estonian sculptor Amandus Adamson.

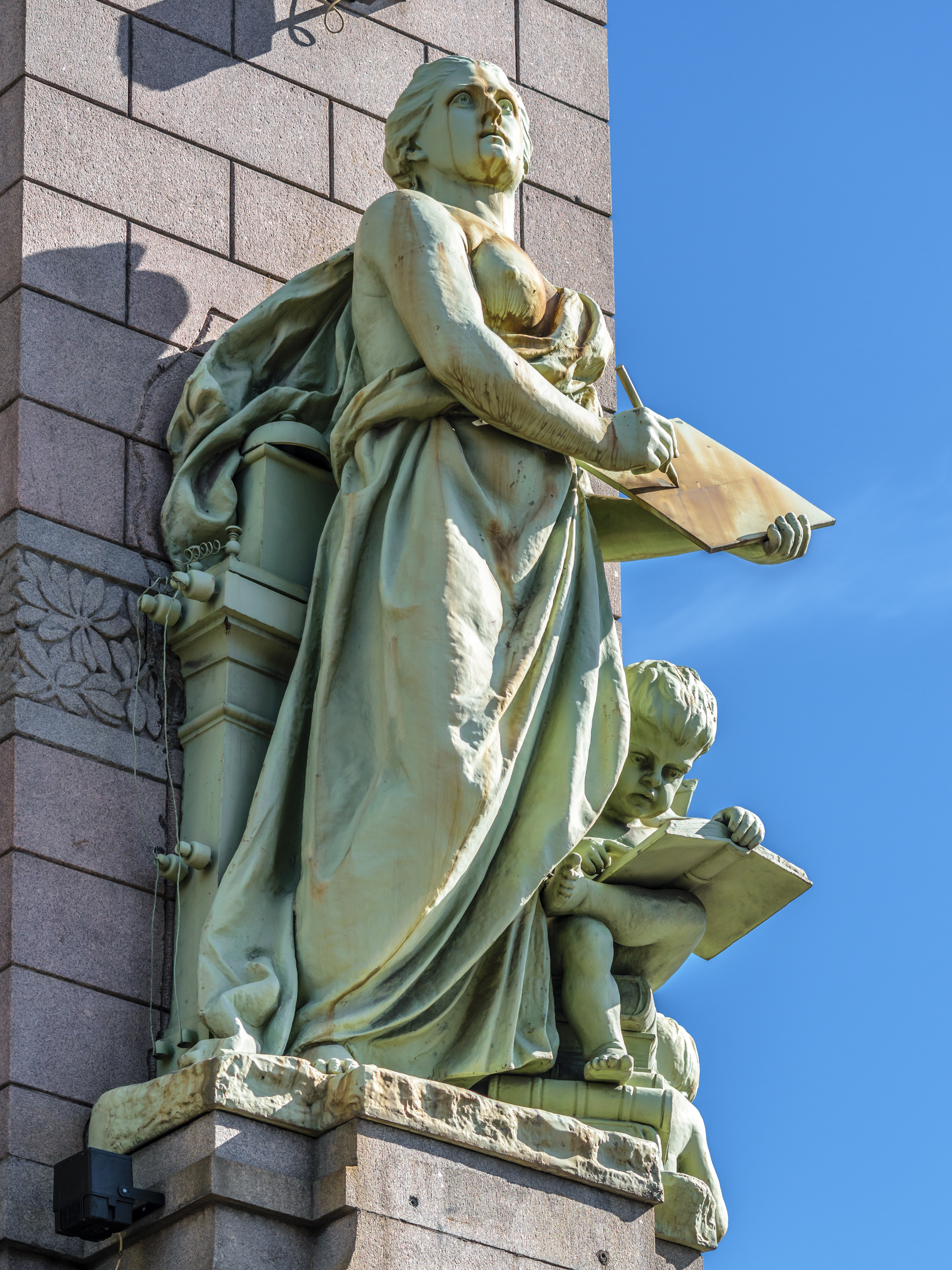
Science

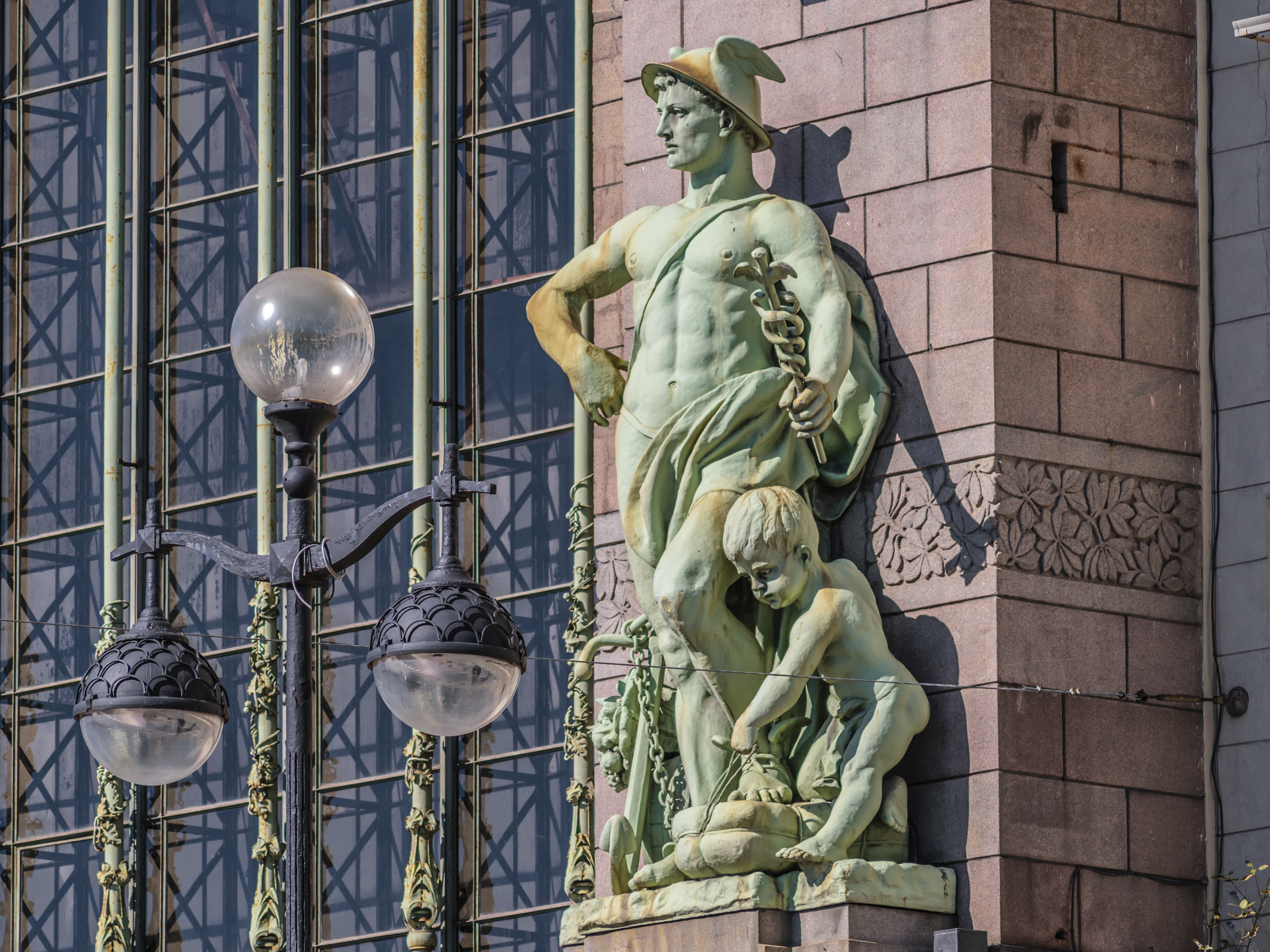
Commerce

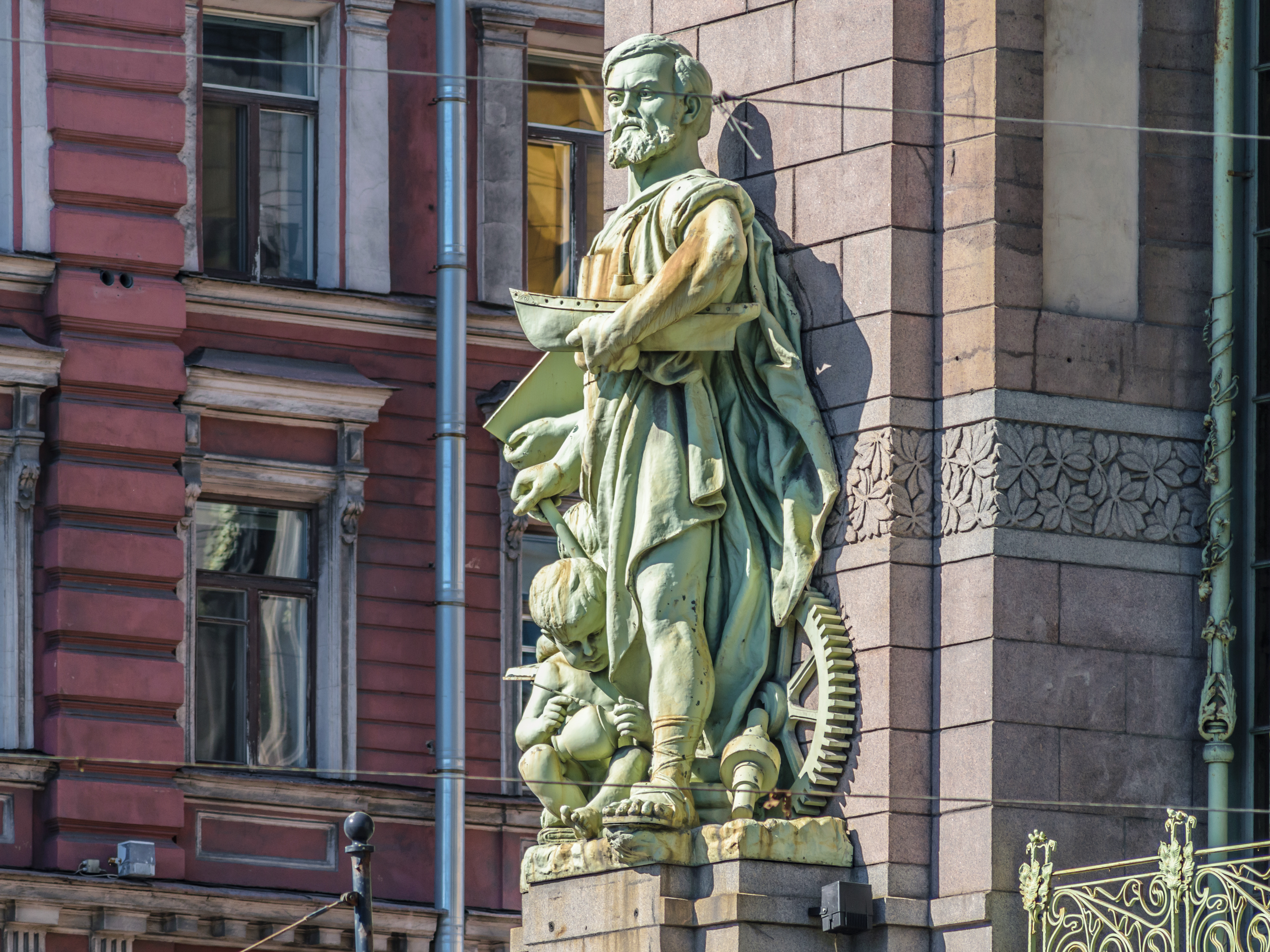
Industry

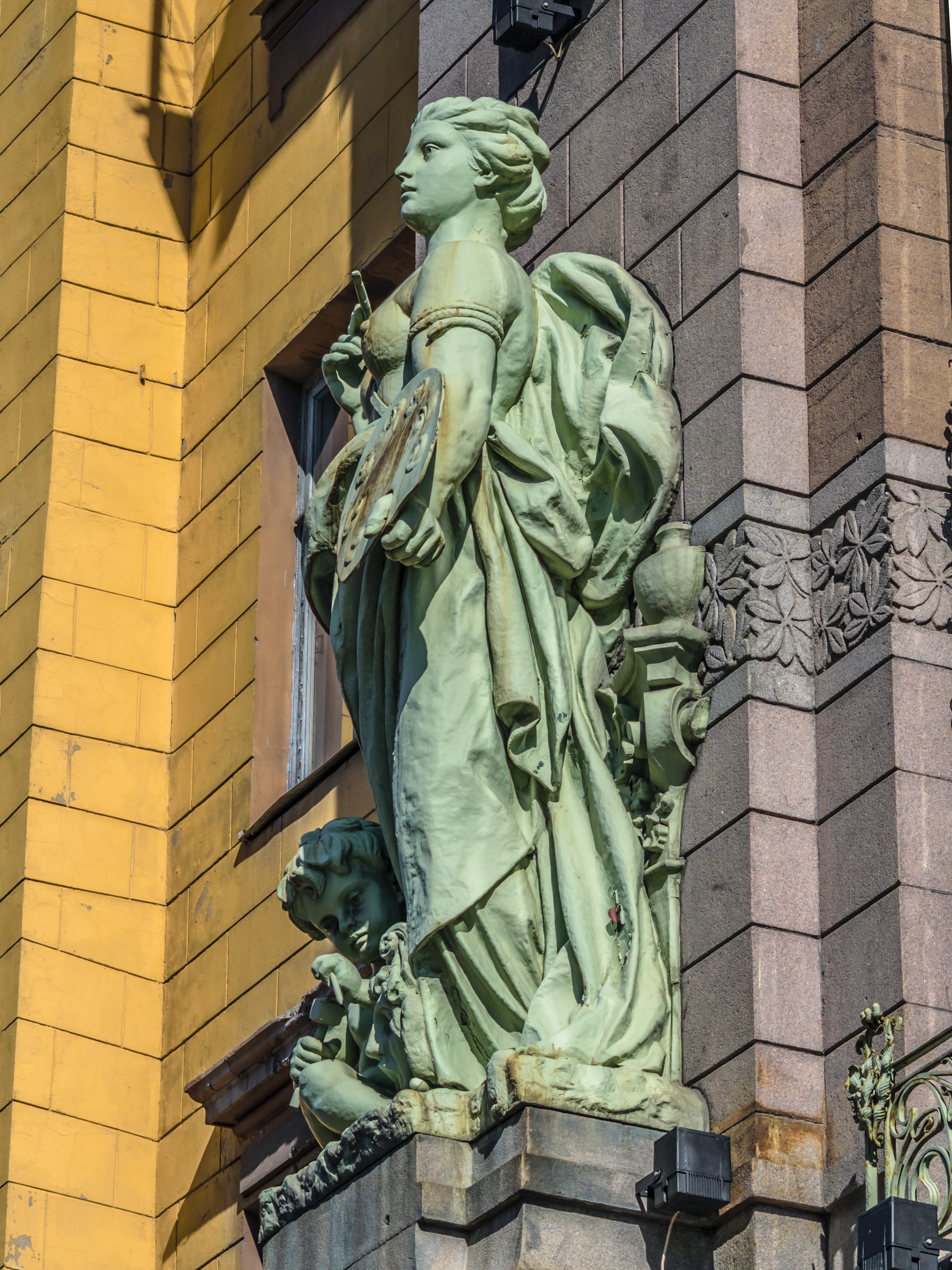
Arts

Inside there were three large retail halls. Above ready clothing and general retail space, bank, public commercial courses (college-level business classes funded by Elisseeff and open to general public), and a performance theater. The theater is still there, albeit its lavish Art Nouveau interiors were destroyed in a 1960s renovation. Underneath the building were walk-in and drive-in coolers and refrigerator rooms for storage of provisions and some of Europe's best wine cellars.

The hall on the lower floor has one of the best preserved Art Nouveau interiors in the city.

=== Tomcat statue ===
On 25 January 2000, a sculpture of a tomcat offered by historian Sergey Lebedev was placed in the building's eaves. The tomcat is made of cast iron and its height is 50 cm; the tomcat has become an attraction of the street, and he is now affectionately called Elisey (a short, affectionate form of 'Eliseyev'). On the opposite side of the street there is a cat called Vasilisa. In 2004, the cats returned from restoration and have been in place constantly since then.

== See also ==
- Eliseyevsky, shop in Moscow

== Other sources ==
- Nevsky Prospekt – the architectural guide (Boris Kirikov, Ludmila Kirikova, Olga Petrova) – Centropoligraph, Moscow, 2004 -(Невский проспект – Архитектурный путеводитель, Б. М. Кириков, Л.А. Кирикова, О.В. Петрова), Центрополиграф, Москва, 2004
- Petersburg – A Guide. Naum Sindalovskii, St. Petersburg 2000 – (Петербург. Путеводитель. Наум Синдаловский. Санкт-Петербург). 2000
- St. Petersburg, A Guide, Kurbatov (Kourbatoff) – 1913. Петербург – путеводитель, Курбатов, 1913
