= Church of St. Nicholas in Khamovniki =

Church in Moscow, Russia

Church of Saint Nicholas in Khamovniki
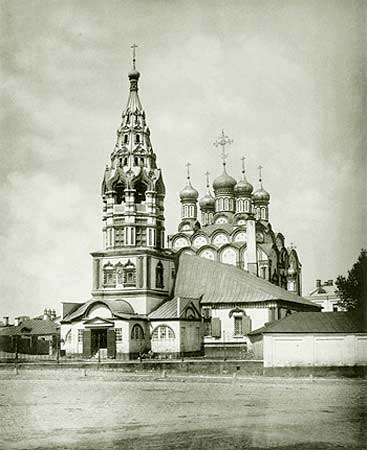
- The church in the 1880s

Religion
- Affiliation: Russian Orthodox
- Year consecrated: 1682
- Status: Operational

Location
- Municipality: Moscow
- State: Russia
- Interactive map of Church of Saint Nicholas in Khamovniki
- Coordinates: 55.732039°N 37.591416°E

Architecture
- Groundbreaking: 1625 (first documental evidence)
- Completed: 1682 (main church); 1694 (bell tower)
- Dome: Five

Church of Saint Nicholas in Khamovniki (Russian: Церковь Cвятителя Николая Чудотворца в Хамовниках) is a late 17th-century parish church of a former weavers sloboda in Khamovniki District of Moscow.

== Location ==
The church marks the corner of present-day Komsomolsky Prospect and Leo Tolstoy Street, two blocks outside the Garden Ring. The church yard occupies a whole block between Leo Tolstoy and Timur Frunze streets and includes a row of small old houses.

== History ==
First records of a presumably wooden church on this site are dated 1625. The main five-domed church was built in 1679-1682; bell tower and refectory were completed around 1694. Present day church sources claim that the bell tower in Khamovniki is one of the highest tent-style bell towers in Moscow region. In 1757 the builders added a side annex dedicated to Saint Dmitry of Rostov.

The church is an example of late Muscovite Baroque that preceded short-lived Naryshkin Baroque of the 1690s. It belongs to a numerous class of bonfire temples (Russian: огненные храмы) – church buildings without three internal load-bearing columns, crowned with layers of small circular kokoshnik-type gables. Each gable is a symbol of a heavenly fire (biblical thrones – angels or seraphs); a tightly packed group of gables is an architectural metaphor for the Throne of God. Small decorative columns "supporting" the lower level gables are an indicator of a Western influence in a typically vernacular building.

The church was severely damaged by the fire of 1812 and reopened only in 1849. Shortly before that, in 1848, the church acquired its principal relic - a copy of Defender of the sinners icon of Theotokos from Odrin convent, donated by Dmitry Doncheskul; the icon was permanently placed in the former Saint Dmitry annex. It also possesses 17th century icons of Saint Alexis and Hodegetria of Smolensk. In 2002 the church donated its icon of Archangel Michael to the reopened church of Archangel Michael in Devichye Pole.

The church operates continuously since 1849. It was never closed in the Soviet period although it lost its main bell (restored in 1992). It was restored externally twice, in 1949 and 1972. Father Pavel Lepekhin served here one of the longest continuous tenures in the 20th century Orthodoxy – from 1915 to 1960. Metropolitan Pitirim Nechaev (1926–2003), who was offered the tenure in Khamovniki in 1972, declined the offer: according to Pitirim, the congregation always filled the church beyond its capacity, making service extremely difficult physically even for young priests.

Leo Tolstoy lived in the church parish, two blocks to the north on the street now bearing his name.

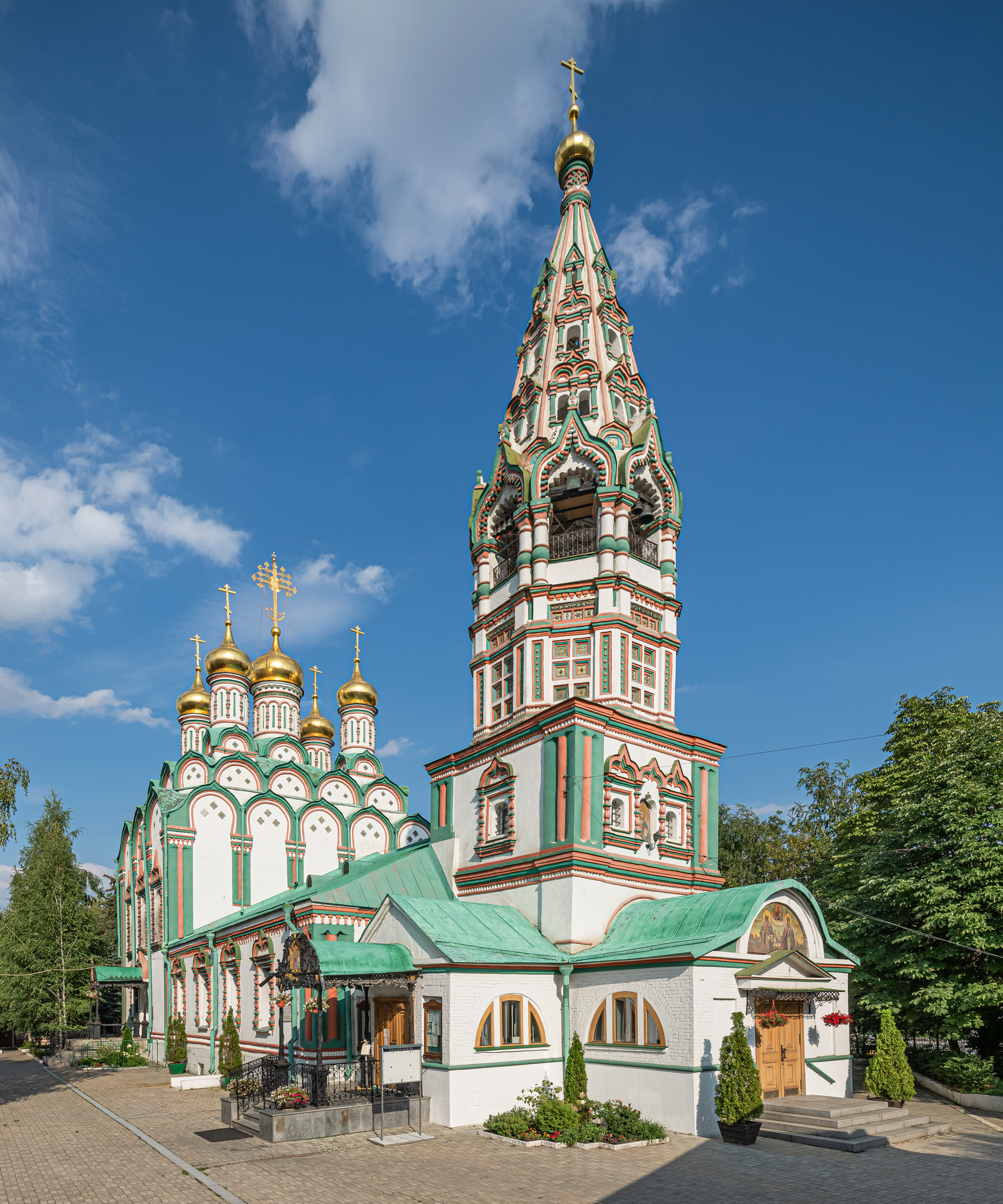
The tented bell tower of Khamovniki is one of the highest of its type
in Moscow region

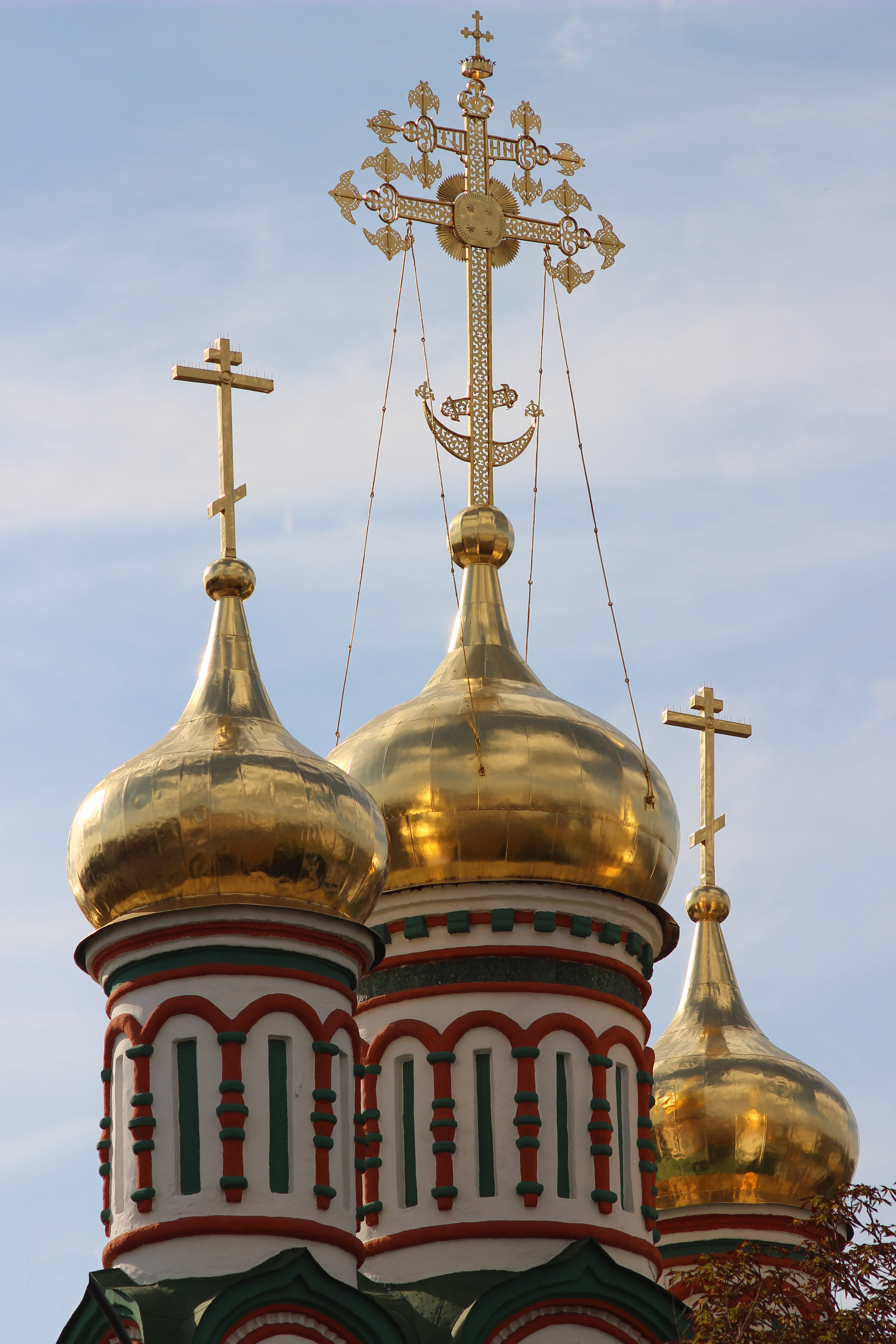
Onion domes of the church

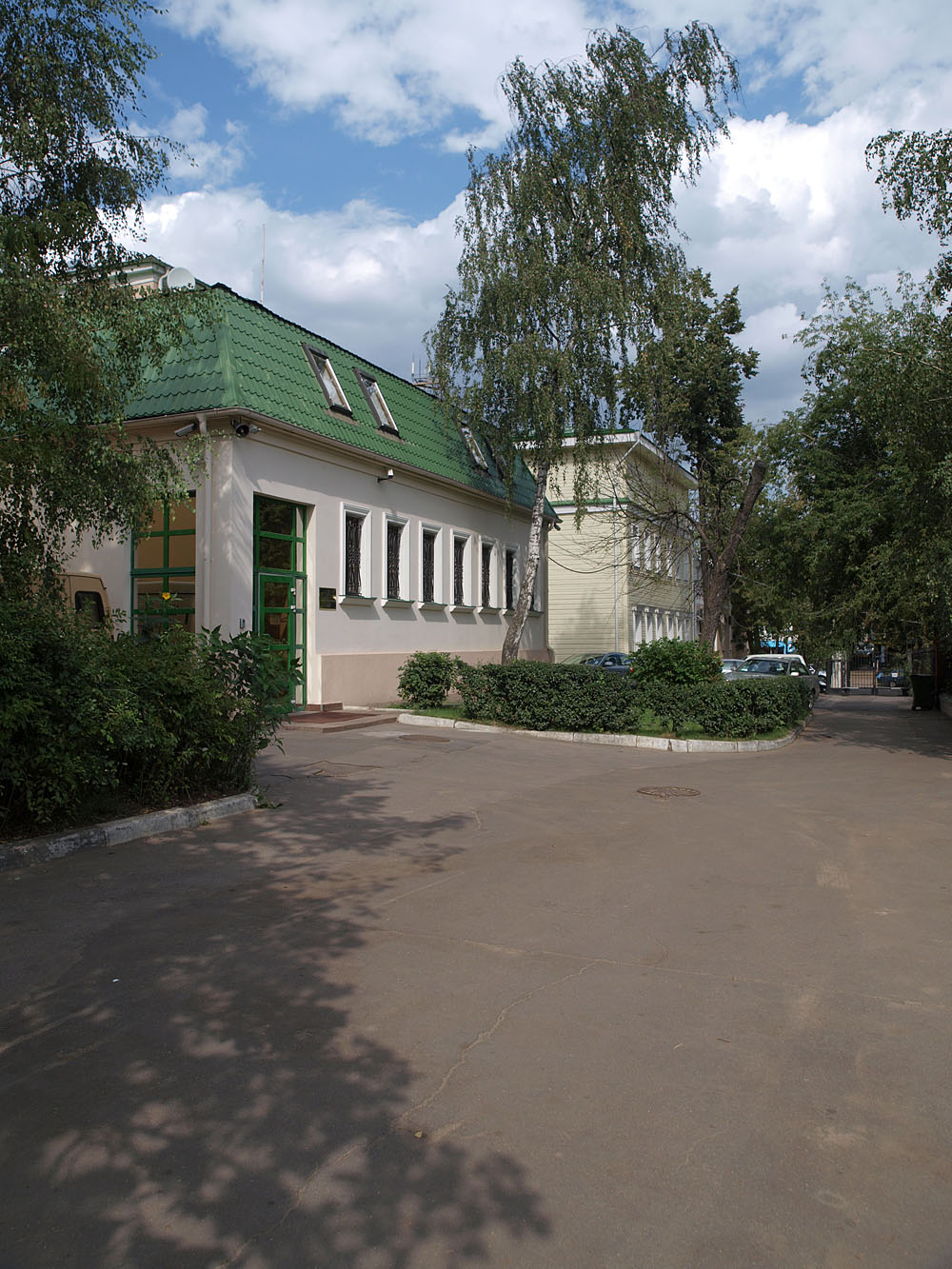
A row of small houses in the church yard

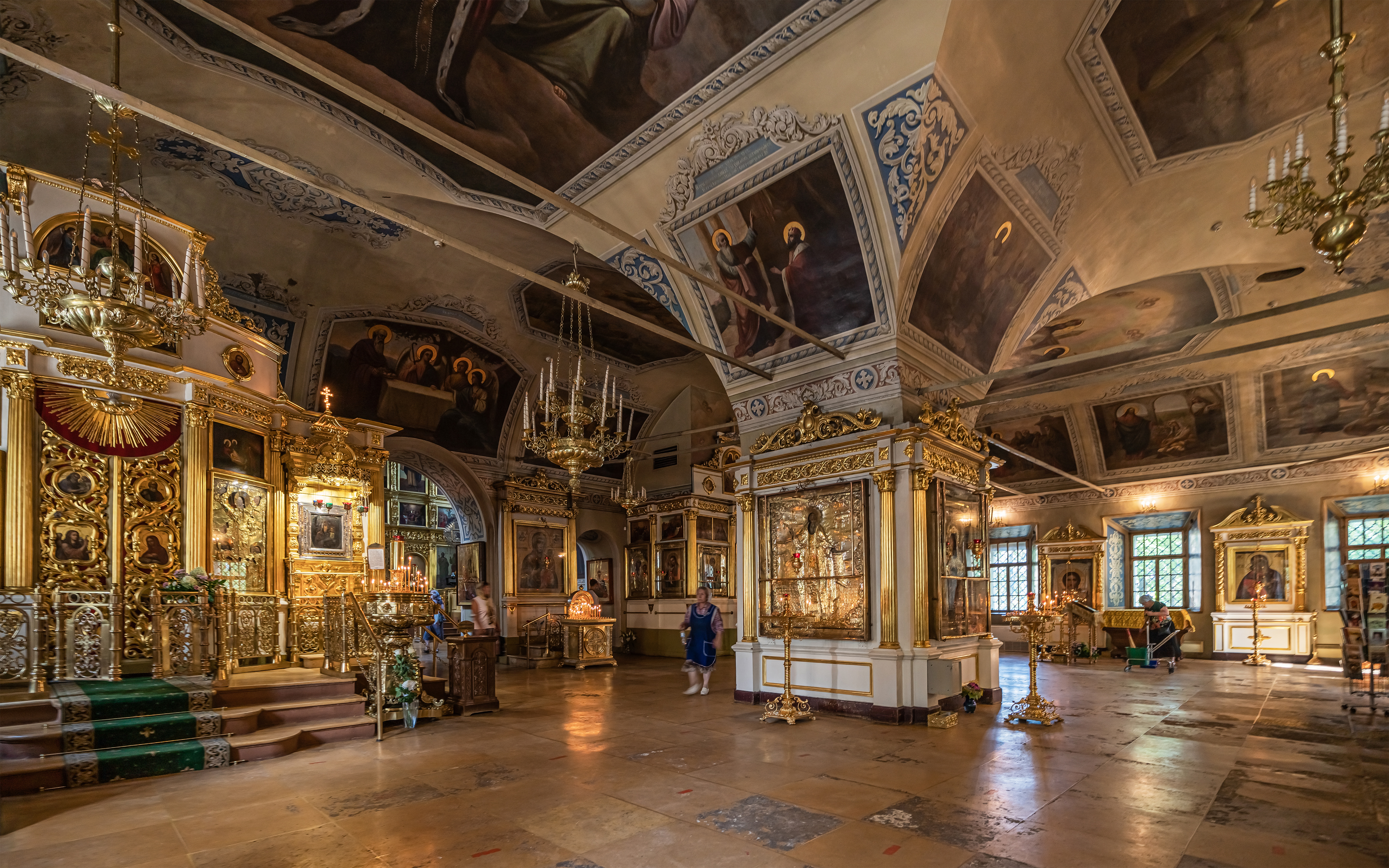
Interior of the church
