= Philippovskaya School =

Philippovskaya School is a private school located in Moscow city, Khamovniki district. Named after St. Philip, Metropolitan of Moscow.
