= Illarion Ivanov-Schitz =

Russian architect

Illarion Aleksandrovich Ivanov-Schitz
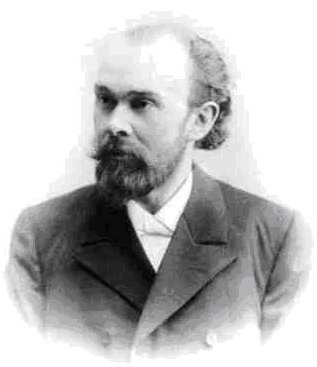
- Born: March 28, 1865; Mikhailovka, Voronezh Oblast
- Died: December 7, 1937 (aged 72); Moscow
- Occupation: Architect
- Practice: Own firm
- Buildings: Lenkom Theatre; Courses for the Women in Devichye Pole; Morozov Hospital
- Projects: Miusskaya Square public buildings

Illarion Aleksandrovich Ivanov-Schitz (Russian: Илларио́н Алекса́ндрович Иванов-Шиц; 1865 – 1937) was a Russian architect, notable for developing a unique personal style, blending the Vienna Secession school of Otto Wagner with Greek Revival features. His career peaked in 1902-1912 with several Moscow buildings including the Morozov Hospital, the Merchant Club (now the Lenkom Theatre), Moscow Savings Bank, and the public buildings in Miusskaya Square. He was one of the few architects born in the 1860s who integrated into the Soviet establishment, earning the Order of Lenin for various resort projects and for redesigning the interiors of the Grand Kremlin Palace in the 1930s.

== Biography ==
=== Education ===
Ivanov-Schitz graduated from the Saint Petersburg Institute of Civil Engineers, which he attended from 1883–1888, with a gold medal. After a brief tour of Europe, he relocated to Moscow, joining the firm of Max Hoppener and later working for the City of Moscow. Another visit to Europe, in 1893, exposed him to Austrian architect Otto Wagner and his circle, who would form the Vienna Secession group in 1897.

=== Early career ===
His first realised design, co-signed by Vladimir Sherwood (Jr.), was an 1889 apartment building at 32 Tverskaya Street, Moscow (destroyed). His early works, such as the orphanage in Devichye Pole (1893), now housing Embassy of Vietnam, belong to the tradition of 19th century eclecticism, and do not stand out among hundreds of similar buildings. Over the first decade of his career, Ivanov-Schitz' style gradually moved towards Greek Revival. Collaboration with Lev Kekushev on his railroad projects and public buildings also exposed Ivanov-Schitz to practical applications of Kekushev's Belgian-inspired variety of Art Nouveau.

=== Mature works ===
In 1898-1900 he completed his first landmark building, an office block on the corner of Kuznetsky Most and Petrovka Street. This building, dominated by vertical ribs, was a clear departure from eclecticism. Despite quotations from Greek architecture, it was regarded as unusually modern for its period; professionals called it "A Greek sort of Wagner" (Nachokina, p. 223).

From 1902 to 1903, Ivanov-Schitz formulated his own style, a modest blend of Secession and Greek revival. Unlike the extravagant Belgian Art Nouveau practiced by Kekushev, Ivanov's art appealed equally to financial institutions and charities; in fact, most of his works were undertaken for these two groups of clients:

- 1900-1905 Morozov Hospital
- 1902-1903 Moscow Savings Bank
- 1903-1906 Abrikosov's Nursery in Miusskaya Square
- 1903-1906 Vvedensky People's House (destroyed, present-day Zhuravlev Square)

After the revolution of 1905, his buildings become more rationalist, yet they clearly belong to the same style:

- 1907-1908 Merchant Club (present-day Lenkom Theatre)
- 1910-1912 Shanyavsky University in Miusskaya Square
- 1910-1914 Courses for the Women in Devichye Pole

=== Soviet period ===
Between 1908 and 1928, Ivanov-Schitz was officially employed as the architect of Botkin Hospital in Moscow. He continued active construction work, engaged in various consultancies for the Bolsheviks, and blended well into the new establishment. In 1922-1925, when most architects were unemployed, he had real construction jobs, expanding apartment buildings in Tverskoy Boulevard and the Eye Hospital on the Garden Ring.

In the 1930s, Ivanov-Schitz was a lead architect for the Medical-Sanitary Board (Лечсанупр), a state institution that catered for the Kremlin elite. He completed various high-profile resorts in Sochi and Barvikha and was allowed to rebuild the halls of the Grand Kremlin Palace so it could seat the assemblies of the Supreme Soviet. In the 1990s, his alterations were torn down and the Palace was rebuilt to the original plans of Konstantin Thon (1794–1881).

Illarion Ivanov-Schitz, received the Order of Lenin. In 1937 he died and was buried with honours at Novodevichy Cemetery in Moscow.

== Gallery ==
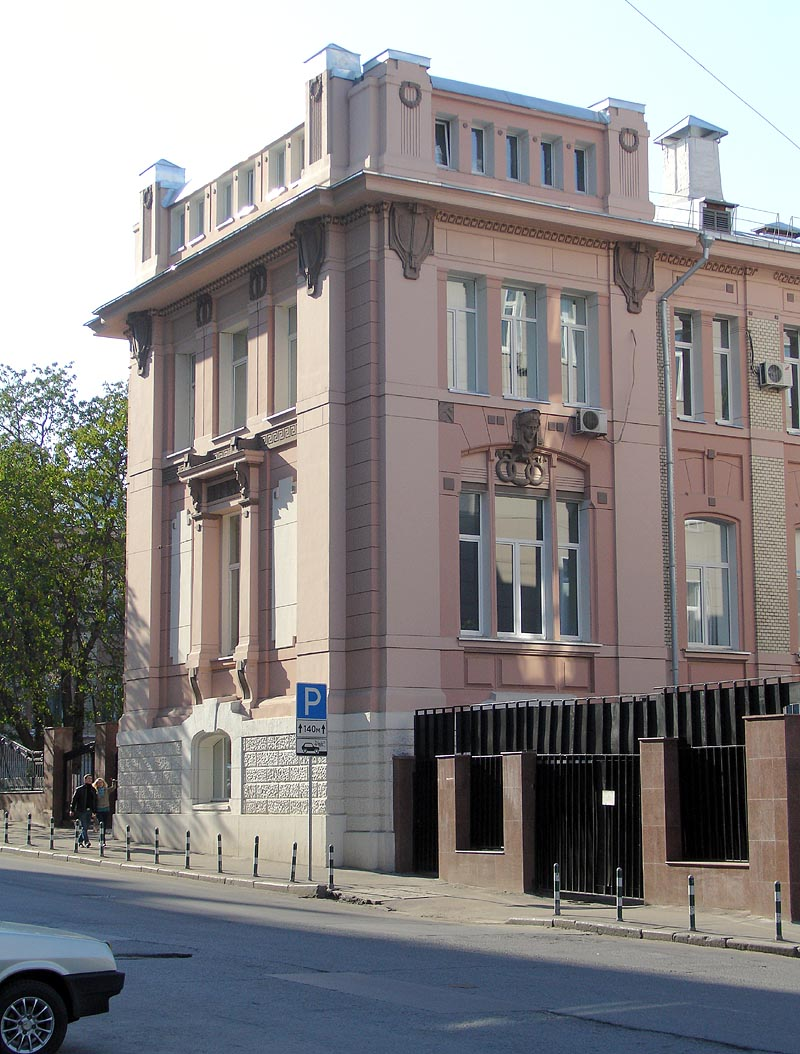
Moscow Savings Bank, Rakhmanovsky Lane, Moscow.

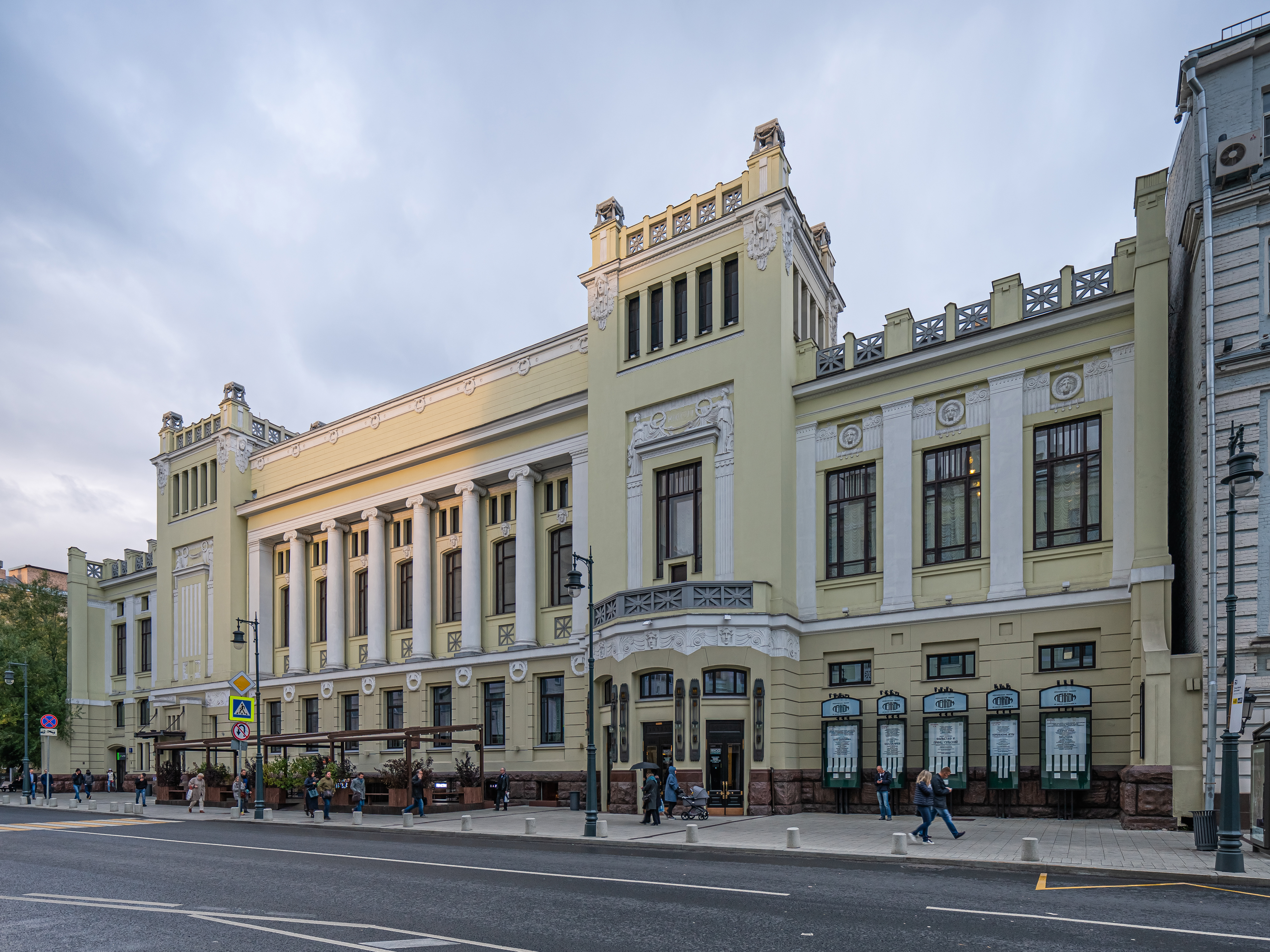
Lenkom Theater, Moscow, Malaya Dmitrovka Street. Built in 1907-1908 as the Merchants' Club.

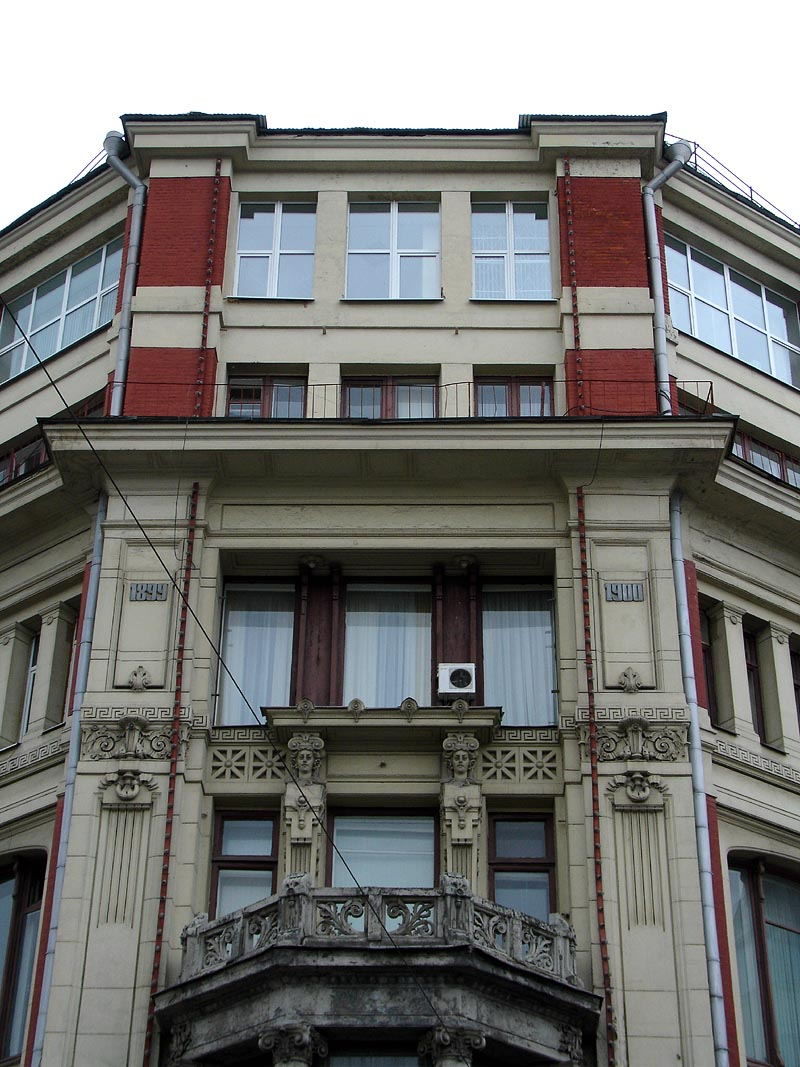
6, Kuznetky Most Street, Moscow. The A. C. Khomyakov building, originally used by Muir and Mirillies department store. Two top floors were added later.

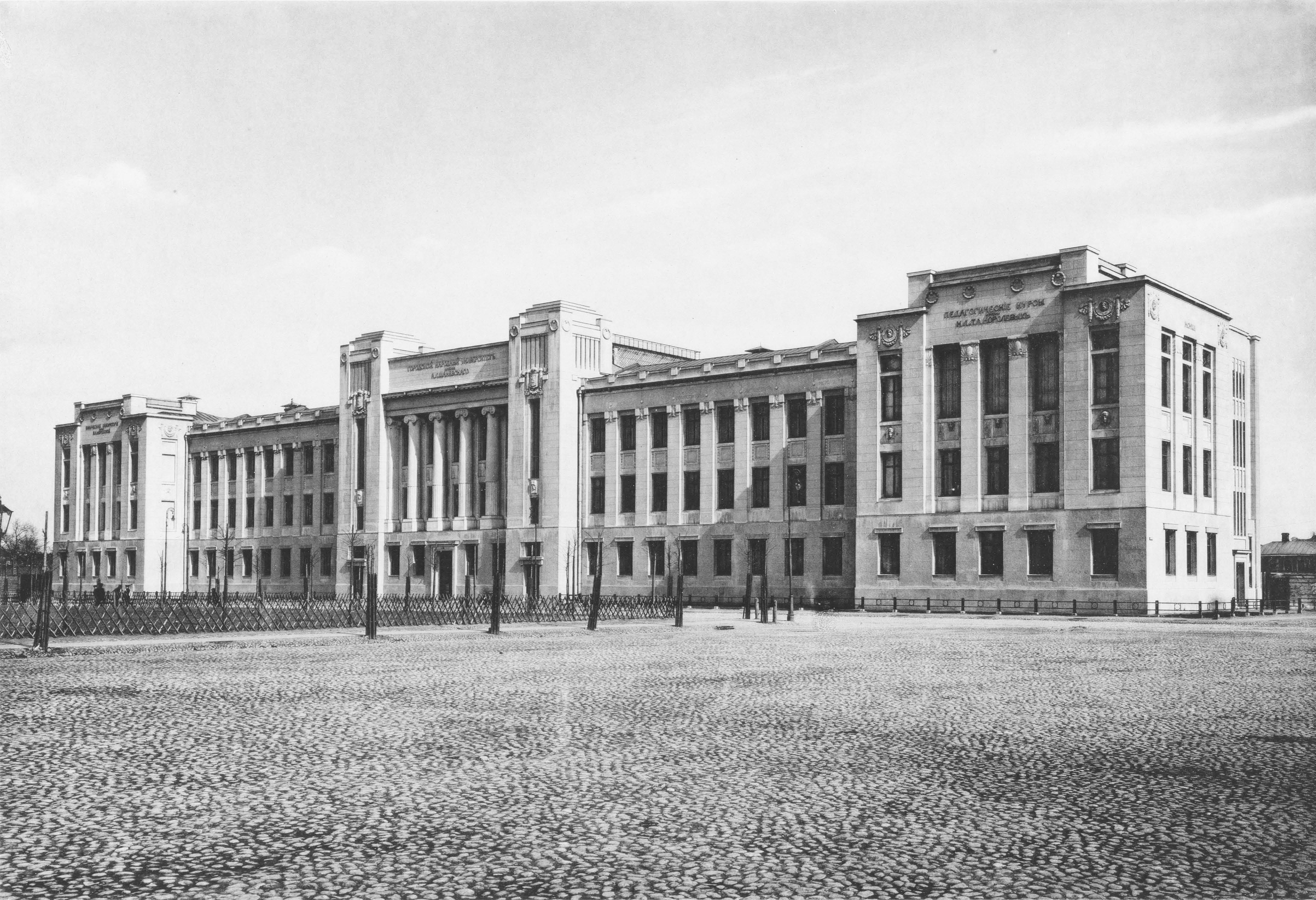
Shanyavsky University in Miusskaya Square, Moscow, 1910s.

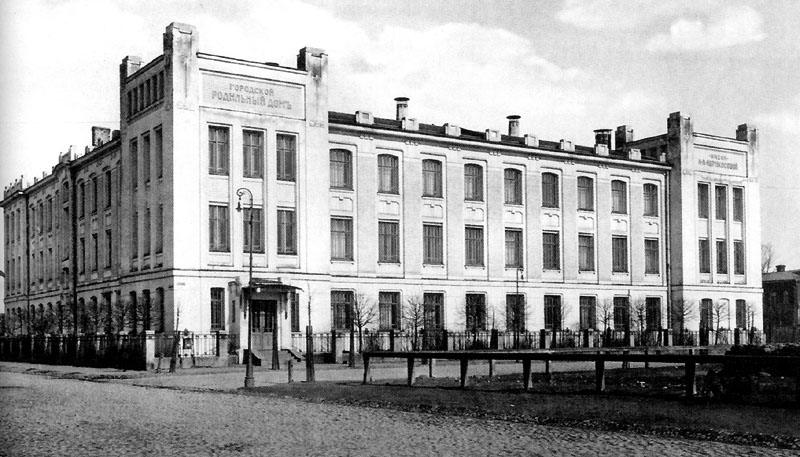
Abrikosov Hospital in Miusskaya Square, Moscow, 1900-1905.

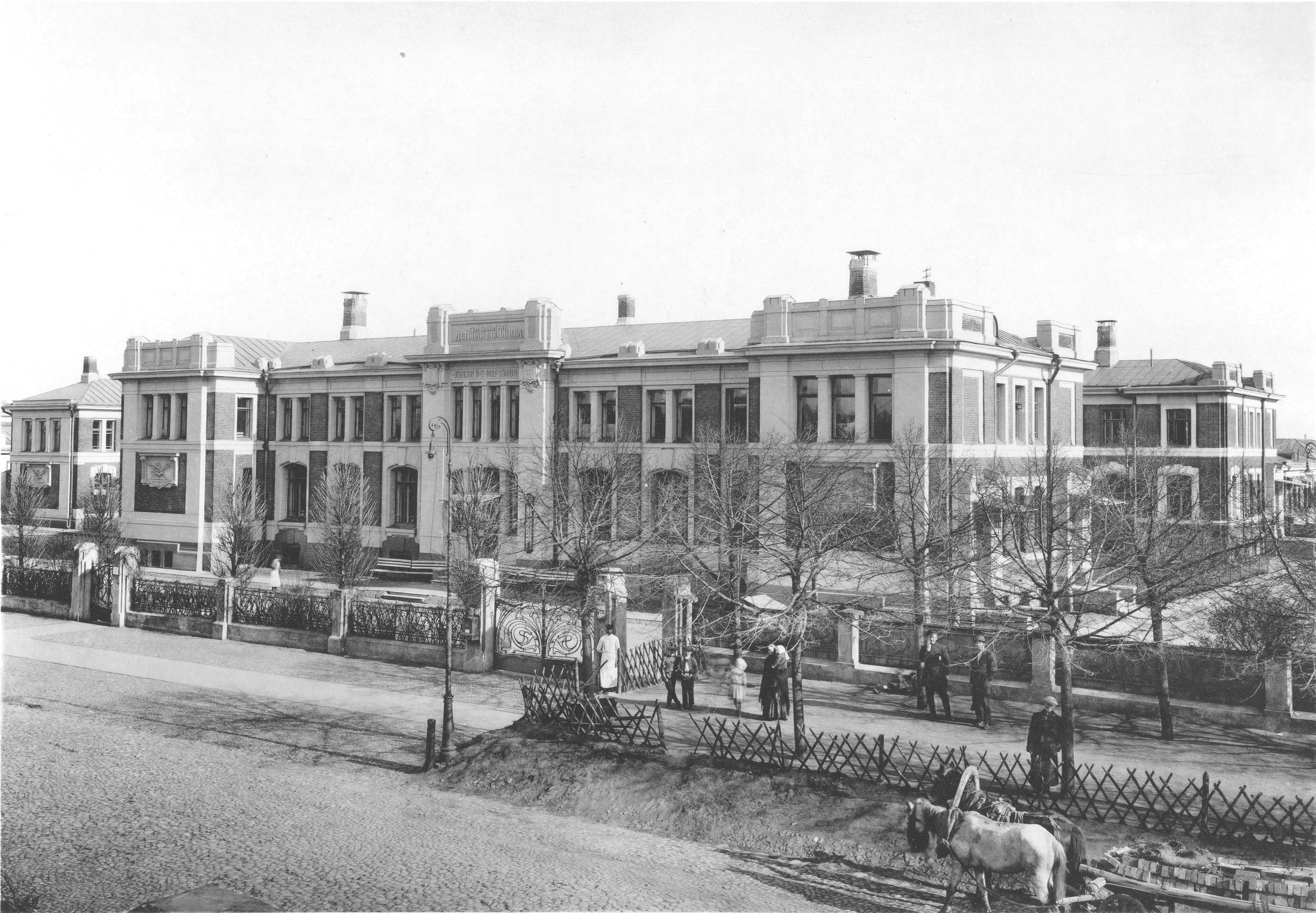
Morozov Hospital in Moscow, 1900-1905.
