= Roman Klein =

Russian architect and educator

- Роман Клейн
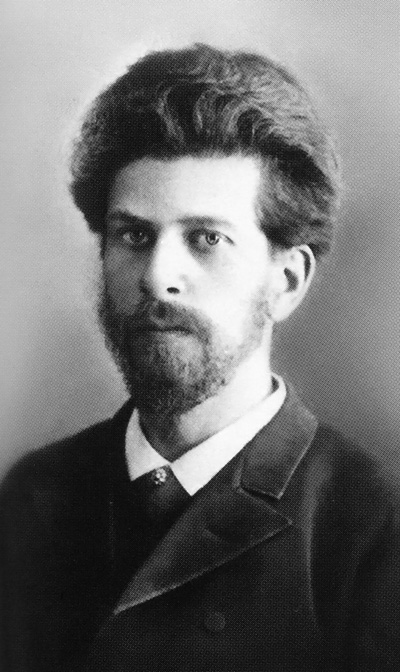
- Klein in the 1890s
- Born: Robert Julius Klein; March 31, 1858; Moscow, Moscow Governorate, Russian Empire
- Died: May 3, 1924 (aged 66); Moscow, Russian SFSR, Soviet Union
- Occupation: Architect
- Buildings: Pushkin Museum; Middle Trading Rows; Moore and Merilise Stores
- Projects: Shelaputin Schools in Moscow

Roman Ivanovich Klein, born Robert Julius Klein (Russian: Роман Иванович Клейн; 31 March 1858 – 3 May 1924), was a Russian architect and educator, best known for his Neoclassical Pushkin Museum in Moscow. Klein, an eclectic, was one of the most prolific architects of his period, second only to Fyodor Schechtel. From the 1880s to the 1890s, he practiced Russian Revival and Neo-Gothic exteriors; in the 1900s, his knowledge of Roman and Byzantine classical architecture allowed him to integrate into the Neoclassical revival trend of that period.

== Biography ==
=== Education ===
Roman Klein was born in Moscow into a German merchant family of Ivan Makarovich Klein. He trained at the Moscow School of Painting, Sculpture and Architecture (1873–1874), with Vladimir Sherwood on the construction site of State Historical Museum (1875–1877), and at the Imperial Academy of Arts (1877–1882), winning a study tour to Italy and France (1883–1884), where he assisted Charles Garnier in preparation to the Exposition Universelle (1889). Klein returned to Moscow in 1885, worked as junior architect at local firms and went independent in 1888.

=== Pushkin Museum ===
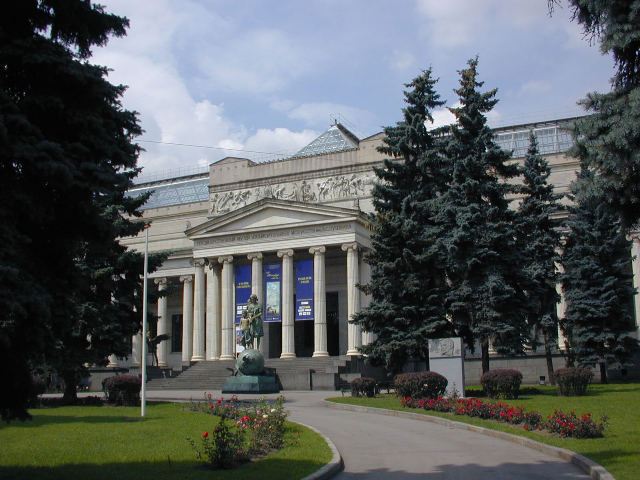
Pushkin Museum, 1896-1912

Most of Klein's professional career revolved around the 16-year Pushkin Museum project. The public contest of 1896, managed by Moscow State University, awarded first prize to Pyotr Boytsov; Klein used Boytsov's general layout but the exterior and interior styling is Klein's own, undisputed work. His knowledge of Greek and Byzantine classics was evident, however, the University also wanted perfection in other historical interiors (Egyptian, Babylonian) and sent Klein on two overseas study tours (1897, 1899–1900). Klein had studied the latest forms of museum construction in Europe, and he built a temple to the arts that expressed civic pride and private patronage, thus pleasing his benefactor, Nechaev-Maltsov, and creating what Lukomskii would have called approvingly a "European" building, noticeably different from the public and commercial buildings whose neoclassicism derived from the local Empire style. Klein employed Vladimir Shukhov for structural engineering of ceilings and sunroofs, Ivan Rerberg and other younger architects. The museum was generally complete by 1907; finishing works and expansions lasted to 1912.

=== Commercial success ===
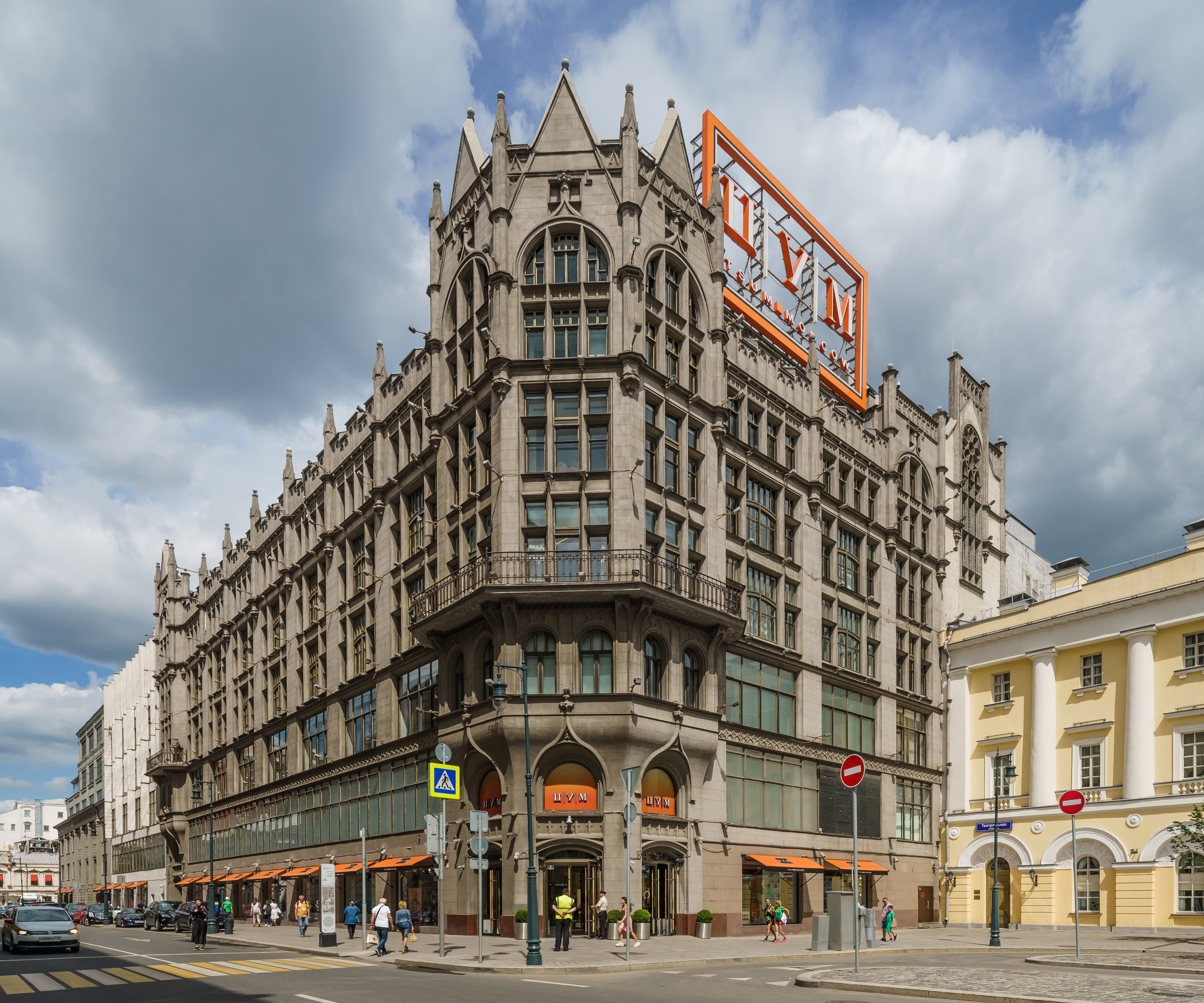
TsUM Department Store

Klein was in high demand among Moscow businessmen expanding their retail and warehouse facilities. He completed such high-profile buildings like Neo-Gothic TsUM department store (1906–1908, originally, Muir & Mirrielees store) in Petrovka Street and pseudo-Russian Middle Trade Rows in Kitai-gorod (1901–1902). Klein also completed a number of banks and office blocks in Kitai-gorod and other districts of Moscow.

Less known is his prodigious input to industrial architecture; Klein was the house architect for Moscow industrialists like Giroud, Huebner (textile and rubber mills in Khamovniki District) and Gougon (steel mills in Lefortovo District). His lesser customers ranged from country farms and breweries to Moscow' first aircraft plant (Khrunichev). Most of these buildings, with few exceptions, were later rebuilt or demolished.

Klein contributed to the Devichye Pole campus project, building the Cancer Clinic, Gynaecology Clinic and student dormitories in 1896-1903; his own house and rental apartment building were located in nearby Olsufyevsky Lane. He designed numerous Orthodox, Lutheran and Catholic churches in Moscow and other cities and supervised construction of Moscow Choral Synagogue (designed by Semyon Eybushits). As a private architect to Shelaputin family, he completed various Shelaputin Schools (for general and professional education).

=== Critical assessment ===
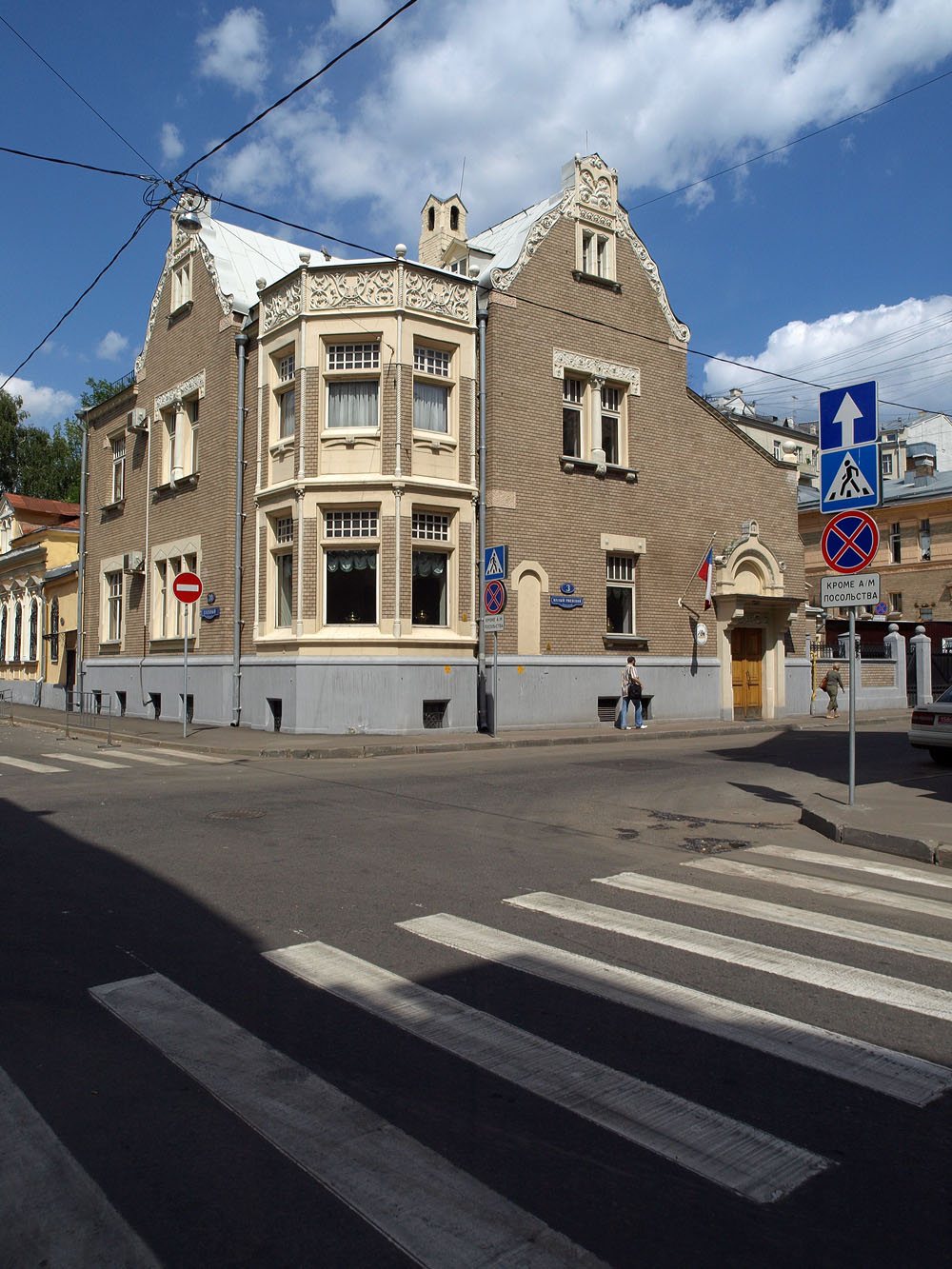
Nekrasov House, 20 Khlebny Lane

Modern critics place Klein's talent below his contemporaries like Fyodor Schechtel or Lev Kekushev (Maria Naschokina, p. 255). All his work belong to eclecticism, which was normal for 1880s but completely outdated by the 1900s. This may be interpreted as either loyalty to his personal style, or as inability to follow the novel trends of his period. Klein had his limitations, but his immense academic background and drawing skills allowed him to imitate styles like Victorian architecture or Russian Revival. His buildings like Nekrasov House are sometimes listed as Art Nouveau, but Klein actually did not venture into this style. After 1905, when public discarded Art Nouveau, his neoclassical skills put him in the middle of Neoclassical Revival of 1905–1914.

=== Educator and preservationist ===
Klein, a successful businessman, possessed excellent skills in educating and managing people. His architectural firm trained dozens of architects who excelled in Art Nouveau (Yevlanov brothers), industrial architecture (Karl Gippius), Neoclassical revival (Ivan Rerberg) and later constructivist architecture (Grigory Barkhin). Klein treated these internships as his own educational work, not just hiring labor. He advocated "finding out the unique, individual features of a trainee architect, and bringing up his own creative conscience" ("выявление индивидуальности проектирующего ... и в воспитании в нем художественного самосознания", Maria Naschokina, p. 257), and promoted the French model of architectural workshops.

In the 1900s, Klein was active in preservationism movement, performing surveys of historical buildings (notably, Domenico Giliardi's University building); publication of his books about these studies was interrupted by World War I.

Unlike other architects of his generation, Klein easily integrated into the Soviet reality of Civil War period - he retained his formal employment as an architect of Historical and Pushkin Museums and the chair at Moscow State Technical University and even received practical (but unimportant) commissions in 1922-1923. He took part in the architectural competitions of the early 1920s, side by side with the new generation of avant-garde architects.

Roman Klein died in 1924 and is interred at the Vvedenskoye Cemetery in Lefortovo District.

== Selected extant buildings ==
=== Moscow ===
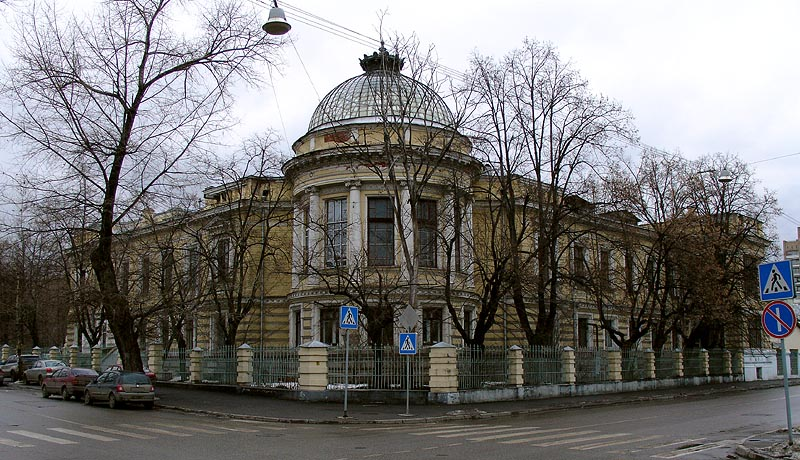
Clinic in Devichye Pole

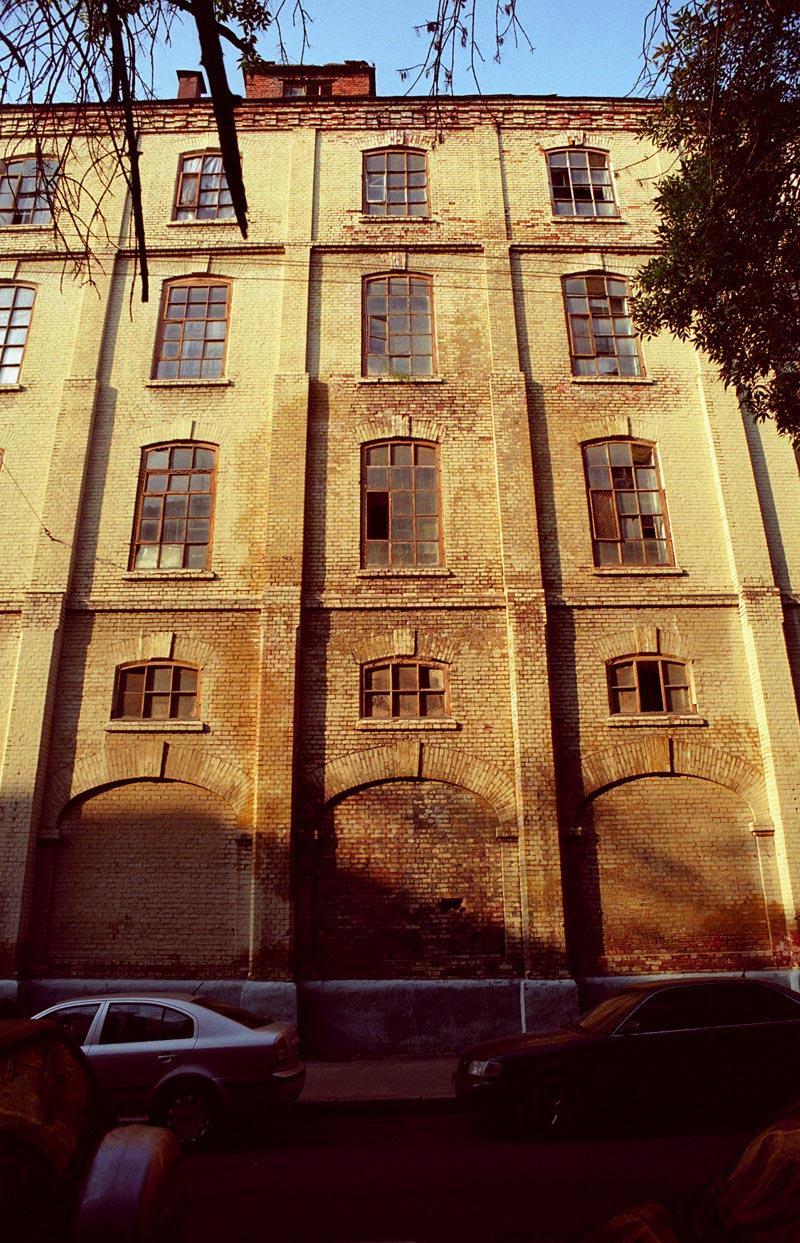
Klein designed dozens of factories; this one, in Khamovniki, has been rebuilt into offices

- 1885 Urusov apartment building, 13 Plotnikov Lane
- 1885-1893 Perlov trading house, 19 Myasnitskaya Street
- 1886-1888 Varvara Morozova house, 14 Vozdvizhenka
- 1888 8, Strastnoy Boulevard
- 1888-1893 Russian and Siberian Banks, 12 Ilyinka Street
- 1890-1892 7, Varvarka Street
- 1893-1894 Snegirev House, 64 Plyuschikha Street
- 1893-1893 Devichye Pole clinics and dormitories
- 1896-1898 Moore and Merilise department stores, 19 Kuznetsky Most Street
- 1896 Draft, Pushkin Museum, completed 1912
- 1898 Simon house and factory offices, 26 Shabolovka
- 1901 Shelaputin Gimnasium, 14 Kholzunov Lane
- 1890s Prokhorov factories, 13-15 Rochdelskaya Street
- 1890s Badayev Brewery, 12 Kutuzovsky Prospekt
- 1900-1902 University dormitory, 10-12 Bolshaya Gruzinskaya
- 1901 Almshouse, 33 Shabolovka
- 1900-1903 Shelaputin School for the Women, 15-17 Leninsky Prospect
- 1905-1907 Electrical power plant, 8, Raushskaya Embankment
- 1906 Nekrasov House, 20 Khlebny Lane
- 1906-1908 TsUM department stores, 2 Petrovka Street
- 1906-1911 Completion of Moscow Choral Synagogue
- 1907-1914 5, Myasnitskaya Street
- 1907-1914 Giroud Factories, 11, Timura Frunze Street
- 1908-1913 Borodinsky Bridge
- 1909-1911 Shelaputin Institute and School, 16-18 Kholzunov Street
- 1900s Shelaputin School for Men, 7 Miusskaya Square
- 1900s Fili plant (Khrunichev)
- 1910 18, Lva Tolstogo
- 1912-1916 Coliseum Theater at Clean Ponds
- 1913-1918 University Expansion, 6 Mokhovaya Street

=== Elsewhere ===
- 1893-1896 Church of Our Savior Not Made by Hands, Serpukhov

== Literature ==
- William Craft Brumfield, "Commerce in Russian Urban Culture 1861-1914", The Woodrow Wilson Center Press, ISBN 978-0-8018-6750-7
- William Craft Brumfield, "The Origins of Modernism in Russian Architecture", University of California Press, 1991 contents
- Russian: Нащокина, Мария, "Архитекторы московского модерна", М, "Жираф", 2005, стр.236-253 (Maria Naschokina)
- Berkovich, Gary. Reclaiming a History. Jewish Architects in Imperial Russia and the USSR. Volume 1. Late Imperial Russia: 1891–1917. Weimar und Rostock: Grunberg Verlag. 2021. p.126. ISBN 978-3-933713-61-2.
