= Church of Our Savior Not Made by Hands in Serpukhov =

Church in Moscow Oblast, Russia

Coordinates: 54°54′37″N 37°22′59″E

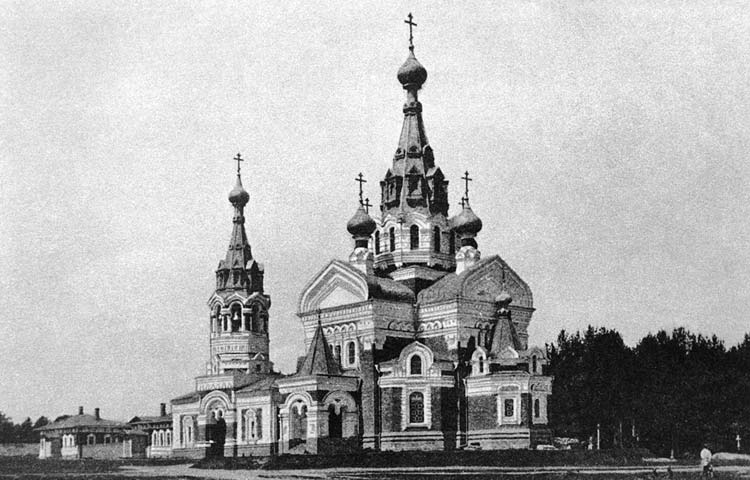
The Church of The Vernicle in Serpukhov. Beginning of the 20th century.

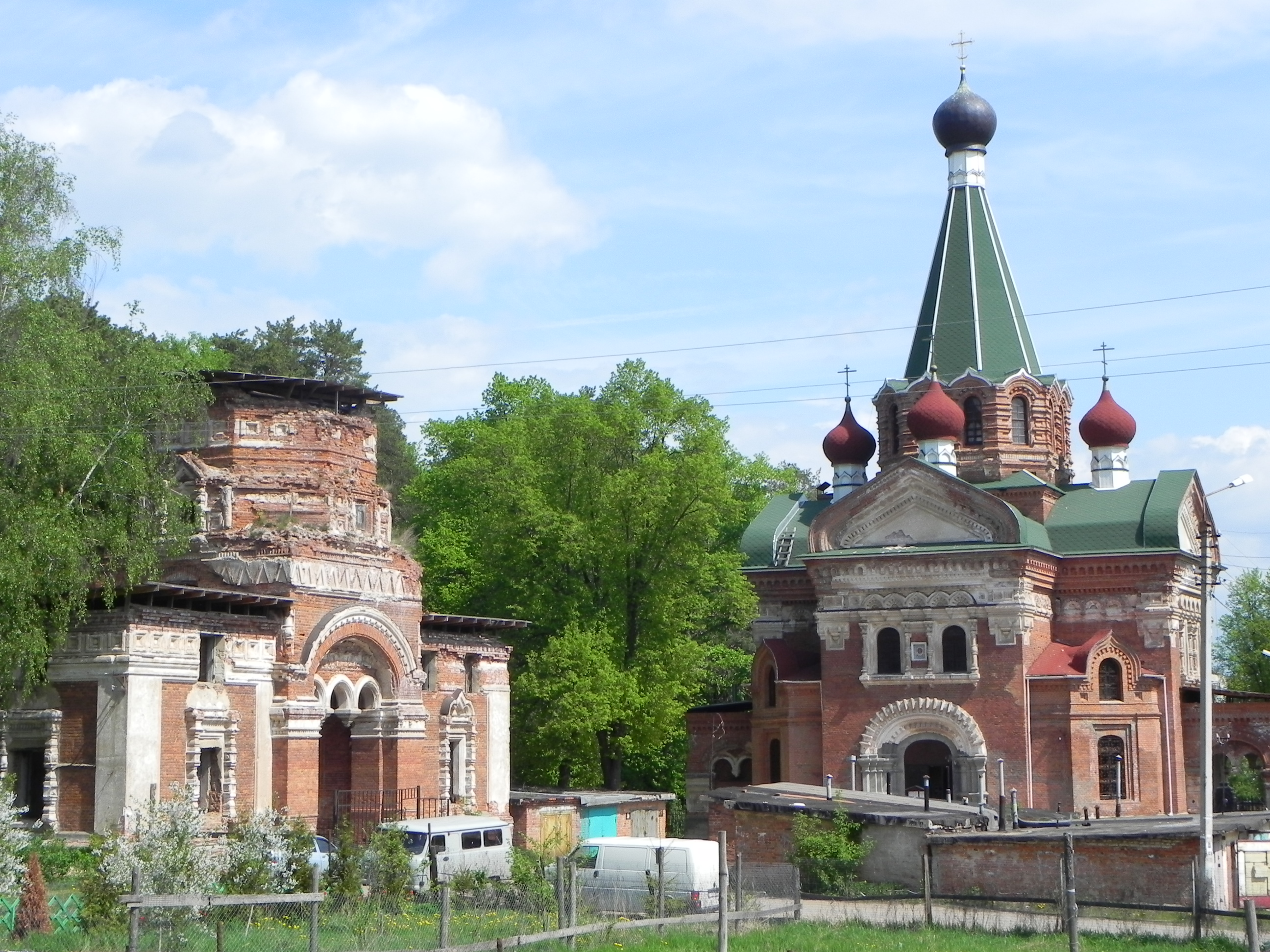
Church of Our Savior Not Made by Hands in 2011

The Church of The Vernicle in Serpukhov (Russian: Храм Спаса Нерукотворного в Серпухове) is a small church in the town of Serpukhov, Moscow Oblast, Russia.

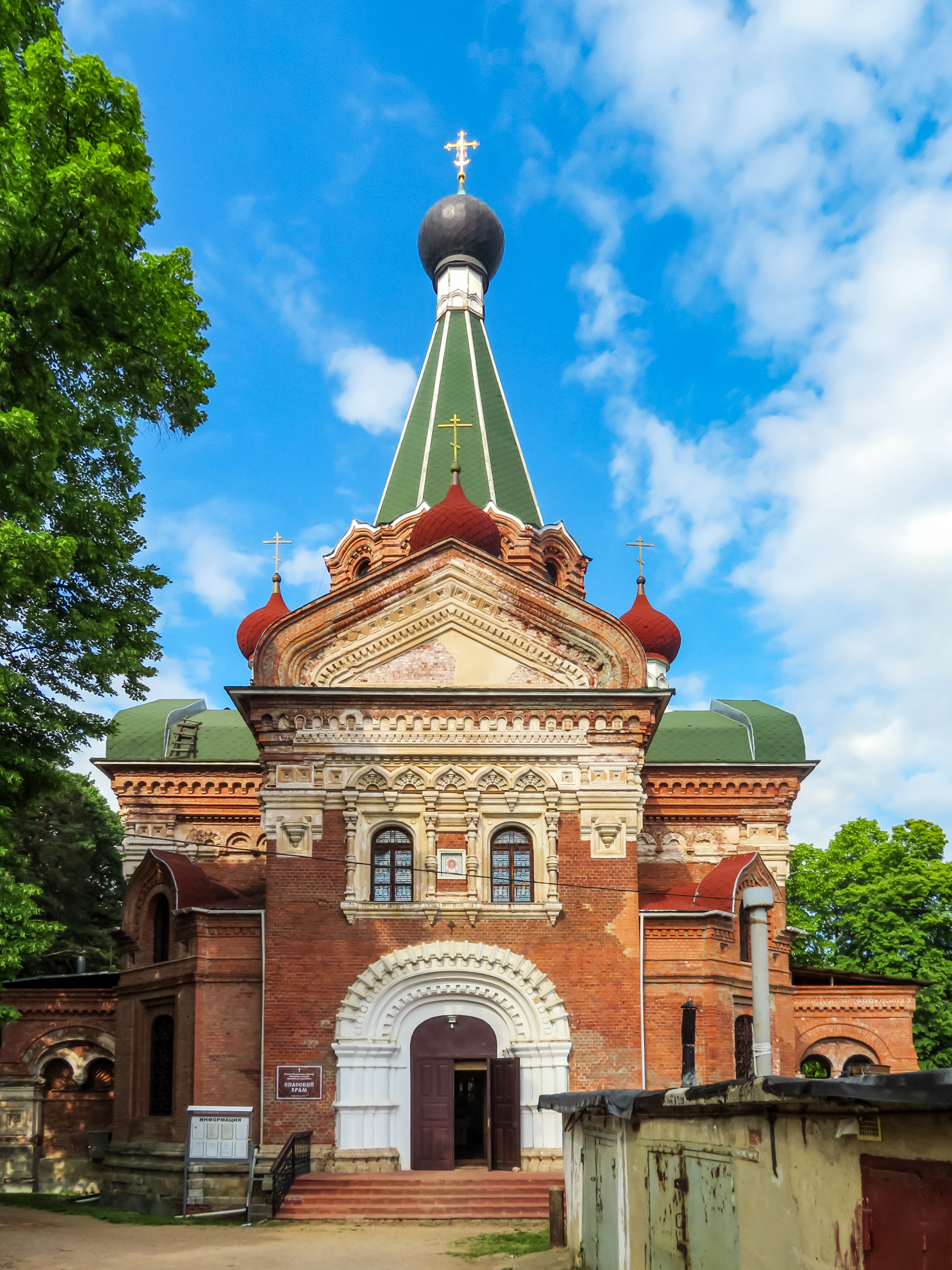
Spasskaya Church of the Zanar Cemetery in 2022

The church was constructed between 1893 and 1896 to a Russian Revivalist design and was funded by Serpukhov's merchant Vasily Fyodorovich Astapov. The structure graces Zanarie, a town district located on the right bank of the Nara River. The architect was Roman Klein, also responsible for the building of the Pushkin Museum of Fine Arts.

The altars in the side-chapels were dedicated to the Znamenie icon of the Theotokos and to the Three Fathers of the Church (John Chrysostom, Basil the Great, and Gregory Nazianzus). The bell-tower with main gates standing separately (its upper deck was destroyed during the soviet time) makes the entrance to the cemetery; there are low houses of the parish clergy near it. Iconostasis was made of zinc and overgilded; its icons represented events of the Holy Week.

During the Soviet time the church was closed and lost its hipped roof and cupolas. It was used as a fish storehouse with a smoking-shed. Over 50 garages are built at the distance of five to six meters around the church. The interior still features tarnished vestiges of the original academic frescoes.

Archpriest Nikolay Bogolepov, who was the minister in this church, was arrested in 1925. Another priest, Nikolay Ischenko, was executed on 23 February 1931 in Moscow. Priest Panteleimon Alekseevich Saveliev (he had served in Kashira before his arrest) was executed at the Butovski range near Moscow on 21 November 1937.

In the late 1990s, the church reverted to the Russian Orthodox Church.
