= Devichye Pole =

Coordinates: 55°43′58″N 37°34′12″E

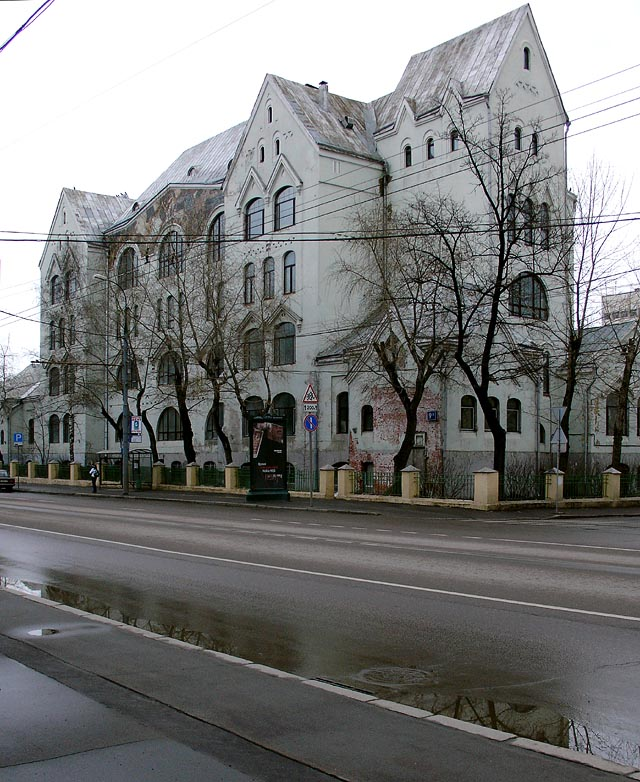
City School in Devichye Pole

Devichye Pole (Russian: Девичье поле, lit. 'Maidens' Field') is a historical medical campus, built between 1887 and 1897 in Khamovniki District of Moscow, Russia, to the master plan of Konstantin Bykovski. It is located between the Garden Ring and Novodevichy Convent. Originally the medical department of Moscow State University, it is now split between Moscow Medical Academy, Russian State Medical University and various state and private clinics. The territory also includes Russian State Archives and Devichye Pole park.

== History ==
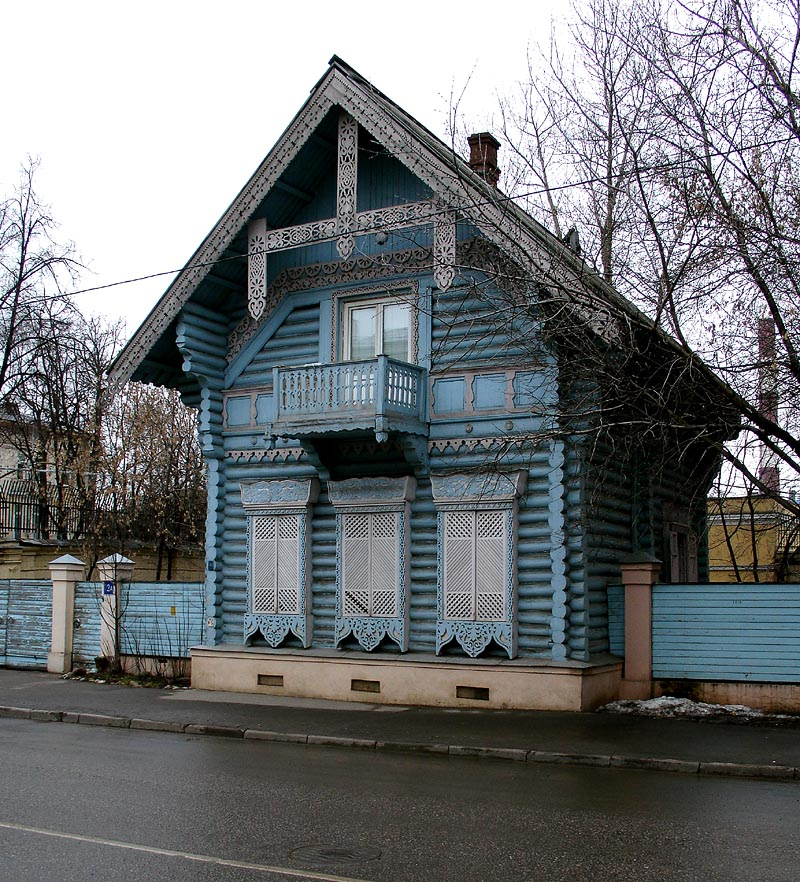
Pogodin's Cottage, 1856

=== Early history ===
Devichye Pole acquired its name from Novodevichy Convent (established 1524). In the 17th century, it housed a court garden for medicinal herbs, and later the court of Eudoxia Lopukhina, estranged first wife of Peter I. Thus, the main street (now Bolshaya Pirogovskaya) was called Tsarytsinskaya. In the late 18th century, Trubetskoy, Apraksin and other families set their country estates in Devichye Pole; the place remained a quiet country until the 1880s.

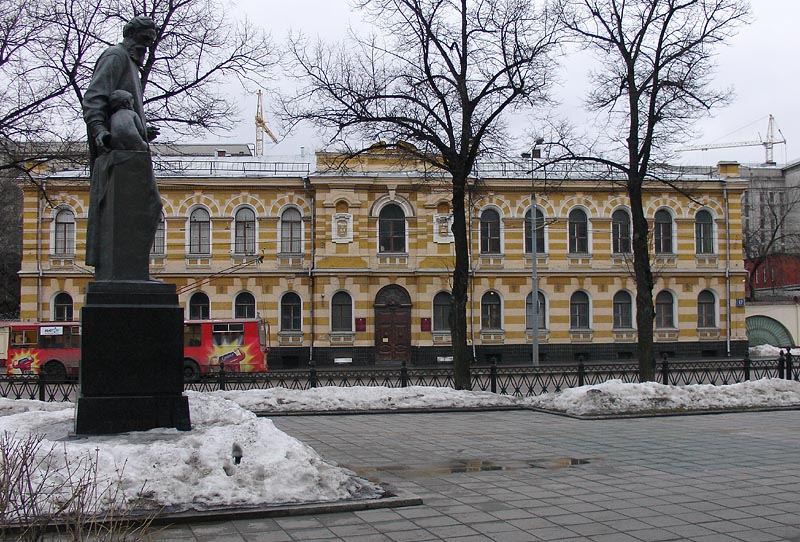
State Archive, 1886, Filatov monument, 1960

One notable building was the wooden Pogodinskaya Cottage (1856, architect Nikolay Nikitin), owned by historian Mikhail Pogodin, once the center of Moscow literary elite. Extant building is actually a side wing of a larger wooden estate. In 1882-1886, Tsaritsynskaya street acquired a two-story Archive Building, now the exhibition hall of Central Archive of Ancient Acts.

=== Medical Campus, 1884–1897 ===
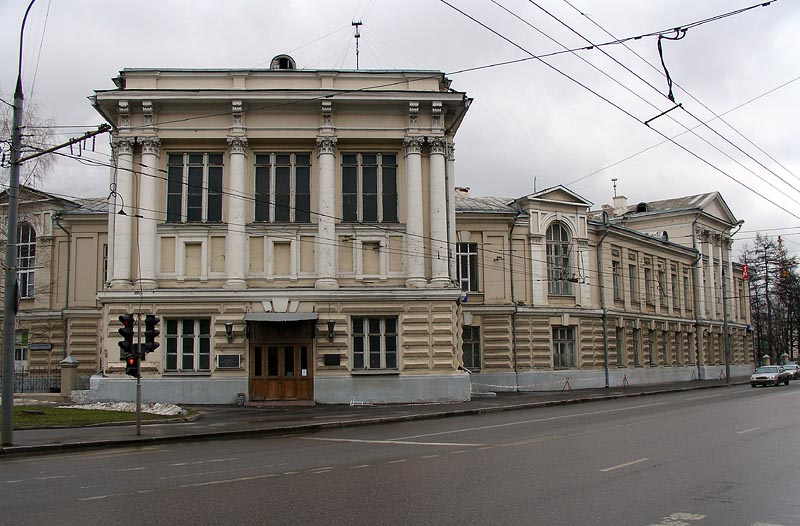
Right-side, city-funded clinics

Need for new hospitals for the public and training facilities for Moscow State University was imminent since the 1870s. Proposals by professor Novatsky (1873) and Varvara Morozova (1882) were left unfulfilled, but in 1884 the initiative of professor Nikolay Sklifosovskiy was approved by the City Hall. City issued free land in Devichye Pole (originally, 18 hectares), national government set aside 2 million roubles, the rest came from private sponsors (notably, Morozov, Khludov and Shelaputin families). University board picked Konstantin Bykovsky by internal vote, instead of a public contest, saving time and ensuring architect's dependence. Professors Alexander Makeyev, Fyodor Erismann, Vladimir Snegirev and Nikolay Sklifosovskiy and Bykovsky formed the project management board. In 1884-1885, Bykovsky, Erismann and Snegirev travelled Europe, inspecting the best institutions of their time. Master plan was ready by the end of 1885, but the national government released its share 2.15 million roubles only in July 1887. Thus, state-funded construction lagged behind private-funded clinics.

The campus was lined along Bolshaya Tsaritsynsksya (now Bolshaya Pirogovskaya) Street, with state-funded clinics on the right (north) side and privately funded clinics on the left.

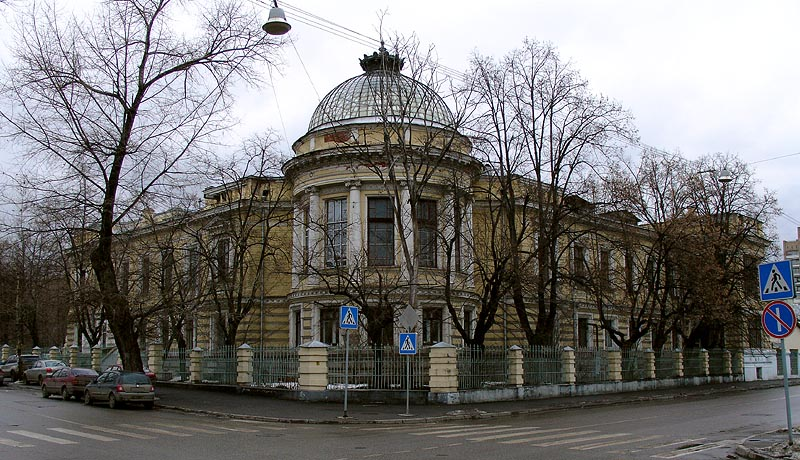
Left-side, privately funded clinics

Construction of the first stage, launched in 1887, was generally completed by 1892 under general management of architect Konstantin Bykovsky (1841–1906). Bykovsky personally designed most of state-funded buildings. Additions were being built continuously after this date, most notably Roman Klein-designed Gynecology Institute (1896) and Pirogov monument by Vladimir Sherwood (1897).

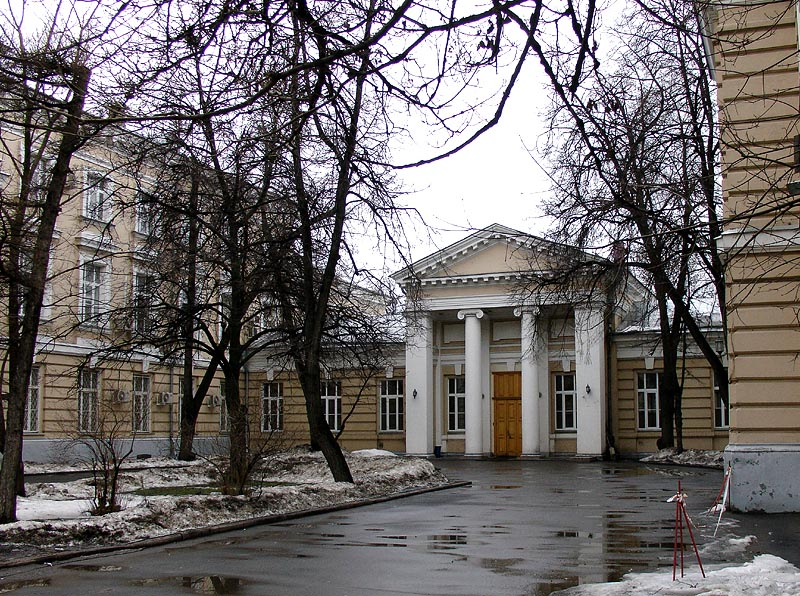
Right-side, city-funded clinics

The first clinic to be opened was a psychiatric clinic funded by Varvara Morozova (1886), now remembered partly by the Pyotr Gannushkin working there. This was followed by professor Snegirev's Gynecology clinic in 1889, funded by Morozov and Nosov families. This clinic was later built out from two to four-story, Snegirev monument by Sergey Konenkov installed in 1967. Other privately owned clinics followed, some linked to personal tragedies in sponsors' family life (Khludov and Bazanova endowments, 1896). An orphanage, paid for by Nikolai Mazurin and designed by Illarion Ivanov-Schitz was completed in 1895 (now housing Embassy of Vietnam). The last building of the first stage was the University Outpatient Clinic, funded by Varvara Alekseyeva, now housing the main building of Sechenov Moscow Medical Academy.

=== Campus church, 1897 ===
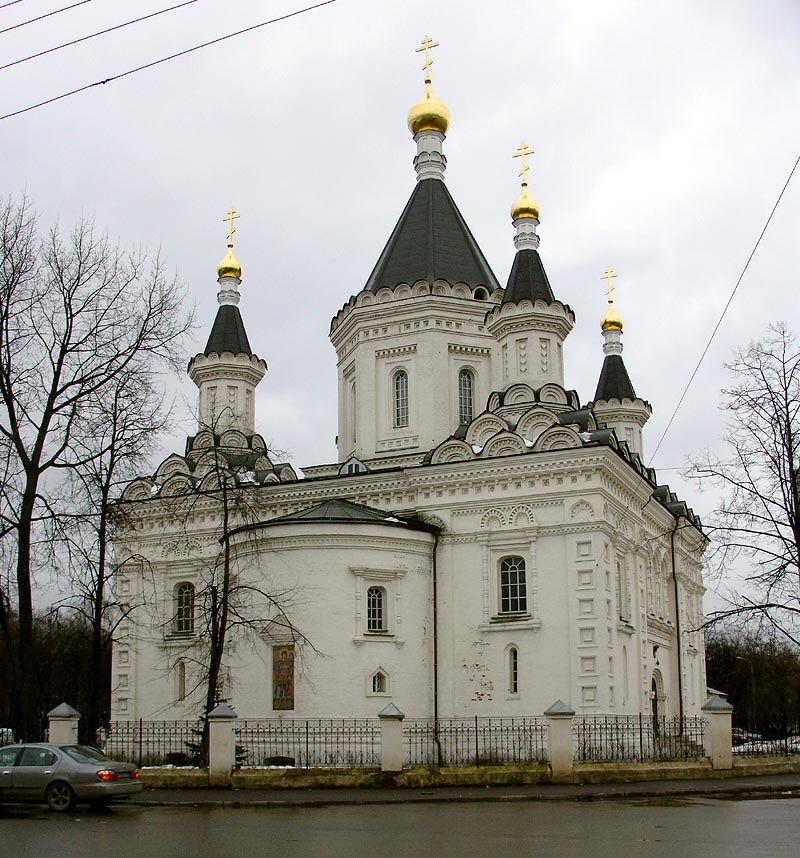
Church of Archangel Michael, 1897

The first hospital church was built in the 1880s, intended to care more after the dead than alive. The main church, dedicated to Archangel Michael, was built with personal funds of professor Alexander Makeyev, head of obstetrics department (initial outlay alone was 100.000 roubles), and late E.V. Solovyova, also an obstetrician. Makeyev commissioned architect M.I. Nikiforov who earlier built the same department building. The church, opened in 1897, became Moscow State University second temple, after Saint Tatiana's.

The church was looted in 1922 and closed in 1931; soon, it was converted to a library, than a warehouse, losing the tented roofs and all interior trim. In 1977, the city started demolition, destroyed the apse and northern chapel; public intervention saved the rest of the building, which was eventually rebuilt to original design in 1997-2002.

=== Cancer hospice, 1898–1903 ===
In 1898, oncologist Lev Levshin (1842–1911) called the Board of University to set up an institution caring for the incurable patients. First installment of 150.000 roubles, again, was paid by Morozov family. The result, Moscow Oncology Institute, was built in 1903 in Pogodinskaya Street in pseudo-Russian style. The same year, it acquired its first radium sample from Marie and Pierre Curie. A state-of-the-art clinic for its time, the institute originally had only 65 beds. After the revolution, the hospice service was cut off; eventually, all hospital beds relocated to another building. As of today, the 1903 building is scheduled for a complete reconstruction.

=== Second stage, 1905–1914 ===
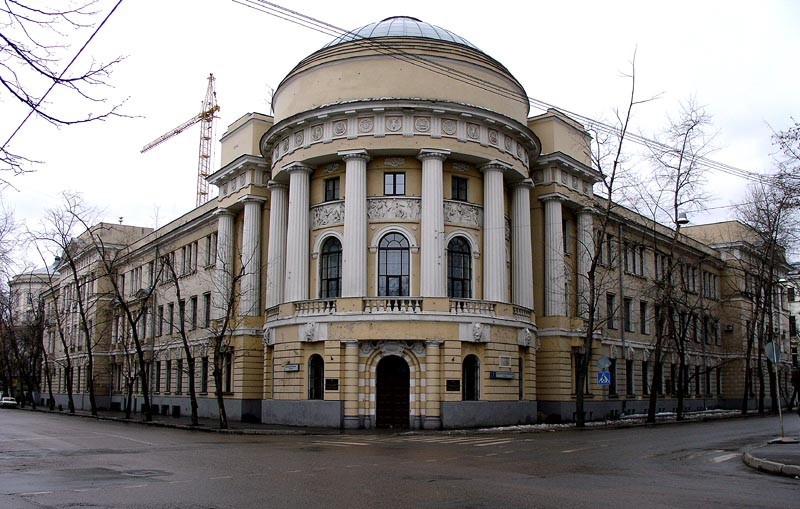
Courses for the Women, by Solovyov and Shukhov

The second round of Devichye Pole development focused on educational, rather than hospital, functions. After the Russian Revolution of 1905, the City and businesspeople realized the imminent social danger of growing disparity in overcrowded cities and focused on education for the masses. Devichye Pole, already having the necessary infrastructure, provided plenty of free land for the new institutions.

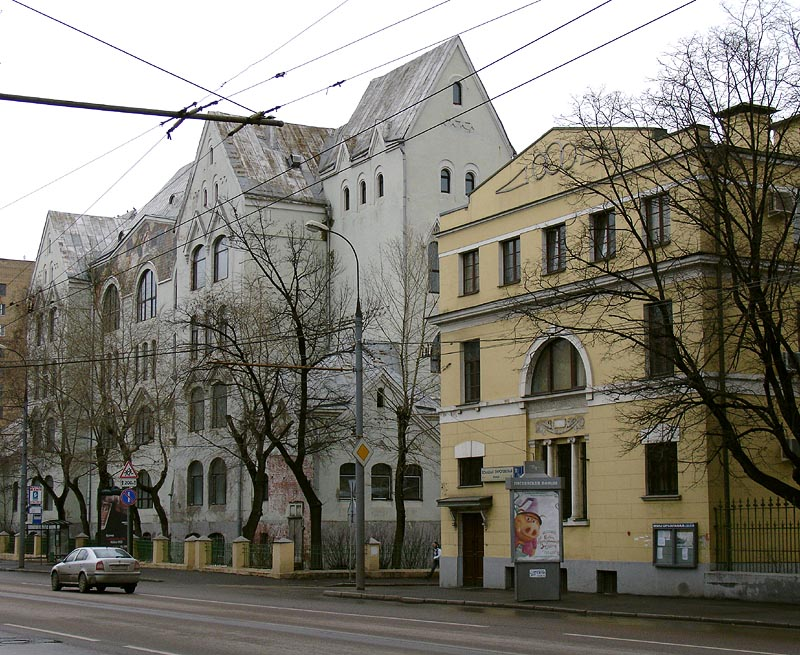
City School, left, privately funded clinic, right

Most important project of this time were the 1910-1913 High Courses for the Women. At that time, full University education was for men only; the Courses were the alternative for women. The buildings were designed by Sergey Solovyov (1859–1912), Alexander Sokolov (1873–1951), and Vladimir Shukhov (structural engineering). Most visible, however, is the Devichye Pole City School (1909) at Bolshaya Pirogovskaya, 9, a Russian Revival fantasy by Anatoly Ostrogradsky (1872–1945) with St. George tile murals. Alexander Zelenko and Ivan Kondakov built the modernist City Kindergarten in 1911.

At the same time, outskirts of Devichye Pole began attracting real estate developers. In 1914, shortly before World War I, an eight-story Cloudbreaker (Тучерез) apartment building was started at the northern end of the campus. Despite the war, it was completed in 1917.

=== Modern history ===
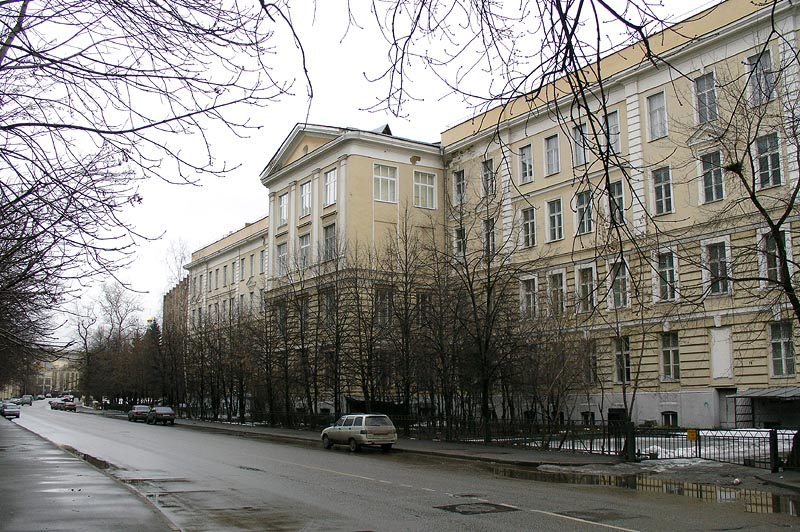
Originally two-story building, expanded to four-story

In the 1920s, the territories immediately south from the campus were developed into low-cost workers housing - the so-called Usachevka Project. Some old clinics on the left side are in state of disrepair. The only building torn down in 2006 was a lowrise constructivist addition. In 2002, Trubetskoy estate on Usacheva Street was torn apart after arson in 2001, and replaced with an enlarged concrete replica.
