= Church of the Protection of the Holy Virgin on Ostozhenka =

Church in Moscow, Russia

Church of the Protection of the Holy Virgin
- Храм Покрова Пресвятой Богородицы на Остоженке
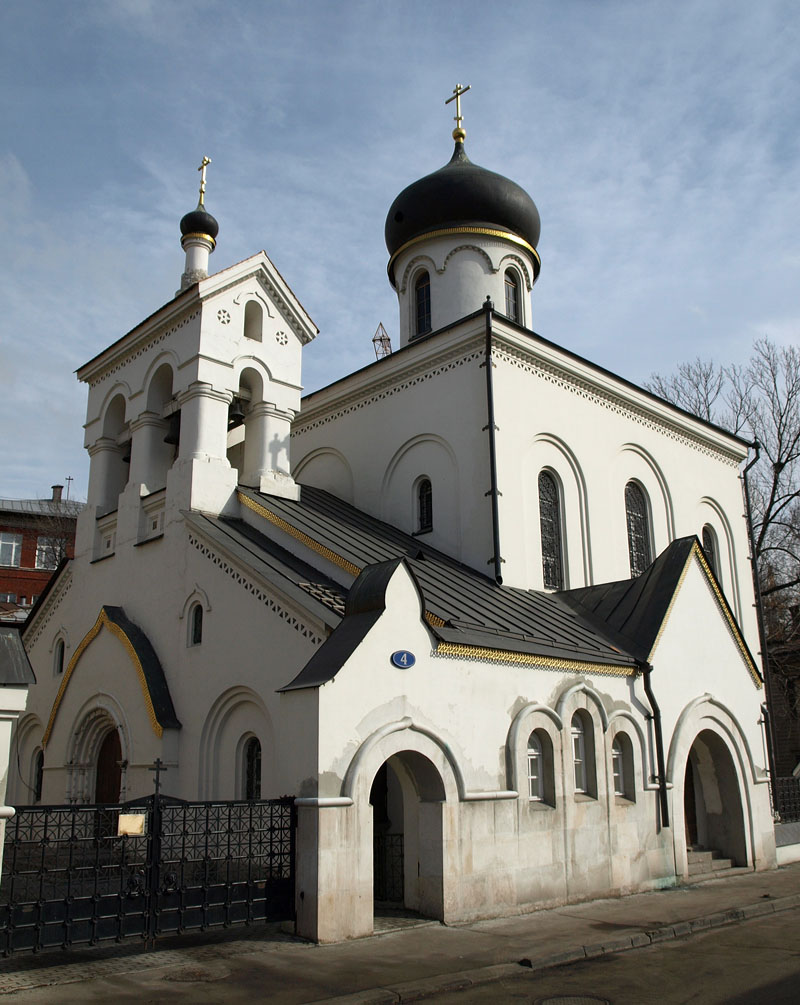
- Interactive map of Church of the Protection of the Holy Virgin
- Location: building 1, house 4, Turchaninov Lane, Moscow
- Coordinates: 55°44′12″N 37°35′52″E
- Type: Russian Orthodox Old-Rite Church
- Website: http://ostozhenka-hram.ru/

The Church of the Protection of the Holy Virgin on Ostozhenka (Russian: Храм Покрова Пресвятой Богородицы на Остоженке) is church of the Moscow diocese of the Russian Orthodox Old-Rite Church located in Moscow (building 1, house 4, Turchaninov Lane). It was constructed in 1907–08 to a design by Vladimir Adamovich and Vladimir Mayat. In 1932 it was closed as a place of worship, and in 1992 was returned to the Ostozhenka Old Belief community. The building has the status of an object of cultural heritage of regional value.

== History ==
At the beginning of the 20th century, the site in the 3rd Ushakovsk (nowadays Turchaninovy) Lane belonged to the Moscow Old Believers merchant Pavel Pavlovich Ryabushinsky. The church was built on this site, with initial laying on August 12, 1907. On August 17, 1908, the raising of crosses on chapters raising eight bells on the bell tower took place. Solemn consecration of the temple was on Sunday, October 12, 1908. On November 8, 1910 a chapel was consecrated in the name of Saint Nicholas.

In 1932 the temple closed by the resolution of the Mossoviet and transferred "for the cultural purposes of Frunzensky district". The church's icons were transferred to the Tretyakov Gallery. The prior and the chairman of the church community were repressed. In 1966 the All-Union research biotechnical institute moved into the former church. By the early 1990s the church was in a state of disrepair and needed restoration.

In 1992, the Ostozhenskaya Old Believer community of the Russian Orthodox Old-Rite Church was registered. The Moscow City Property Committee transferred the church and the cleric's house (2, Turchaninov Lane) to it, and restoration works began. On February 8, 1998, the raising of church's crosses and bells took place. On December 12, 1999, the church was consecrated.

== Architecture ==
The church is built in the National Romantic style of Art Nouveau. The cubic volume of the temple is topped by a cupola with a cross. The dome stands on a cylindrical drum with the edge reminiscent of those of ancient Novgorod. To the west, the main building is adjoined by a two-storey belfry made in the spirit of Pskov architecture. The runner along the top of the walls is in the same style. The lateral apses are lowered. The windows on facades of the church are placed in semi-circular niches. The gated church porch is at the southern facade and is in the Art Nouveau style.
