= Mykhailivka, Vinnytsia Oblast =

Mykhailivka Михайлівка
- Village
- Location within Ukraine Mykhailivka (Ukraine)
- Coordinates: 49°11′52″N 28°43′29″E
- Country: Ukraine
- Province: Vinnytsia Oblast
- Raion: Vinnytsia Raion
- Founded: 1510

Area
  - Total: 2.184 km^{2} (0.843 sq mi)

Population (2001)
  - Total: 906
  - Density: 414.8/km^{2} (1,074/sq mi)
- Postal code: 23203
- Area code: 432

Mykhailivka (Ukrainian: Михайлівка, Russian: Михайловка, Polish: Michałówka) is a village in the Vinnytsia Raion of the Vinnytsia Oblast of Ukraine. The area is 2.184 km^{2} and the population (2001 census) is 906 inhabitants.

The postal code is 23203, the telephone area code is 432, and the KOATUU (territorial administrative classification) code is 0520681406.

== History ==
The village was founded in 1510. No more than 10 families lived in the village, which were settled by Count Groholsky. The name of the village comes from the name of Mikhailin — one of the daughters of Count Groholsky. In 1633, a wooden church was built in the village, and in 1992, a new modern church was built at the expense of local residents and with the local support of the board of the collective farm named after Chapaeva.

On 30 April 1831, during the November Uprising, fighters under Captain Kurowski won a battle here against a Russian unit from Machnówka.
