= Landmarks of Saint Petersburg =

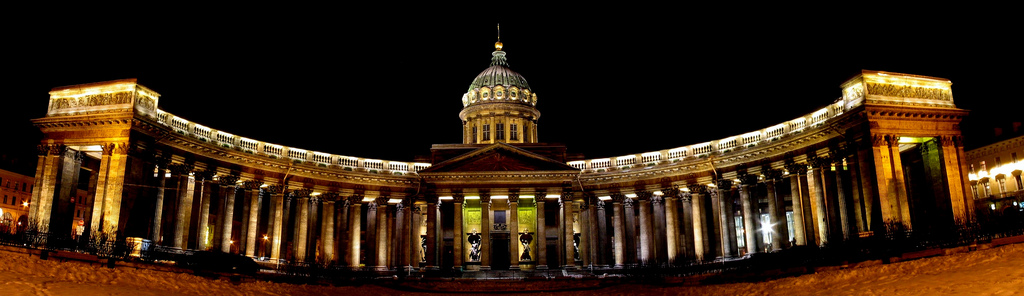
Kazan Cathedral at night 2006

The appearance of Saint Petersburg includes long, straight boulevards, vast spaces, gardens and parks, decorative wrought-iron fences, monuments and decorative sculptures. The Neva River itself, together with its many canals and their granite embankments and bridges help to give the city its particular ambience.

Saint Petersburg's position below the Arctic Circle, on the same latitude as nearby Helsinki, Stockholm, Aberdeen and Oslo (60° N), causes twilight to last all night in May, June and July. This phenomenon is known as the "white nights". The white nights are closely linked to another attraction — the eight drawbridges spanning the Neva. The bridges are drawn from May to late October according to a special schedule, between approximately 2 a.m. and 4:30 a.m. to allow shipping to pass up and down the river. Every night during the navigation period from April to November, 22 bridges across Neva and main canals are drawn to let ships pass in and out of the Baltic Sea.

The historical center of Saint Petersburg was the first Russian patrimony inscribed on the UNESCO list of World Heritage Sites.

== Canals and bridges ==
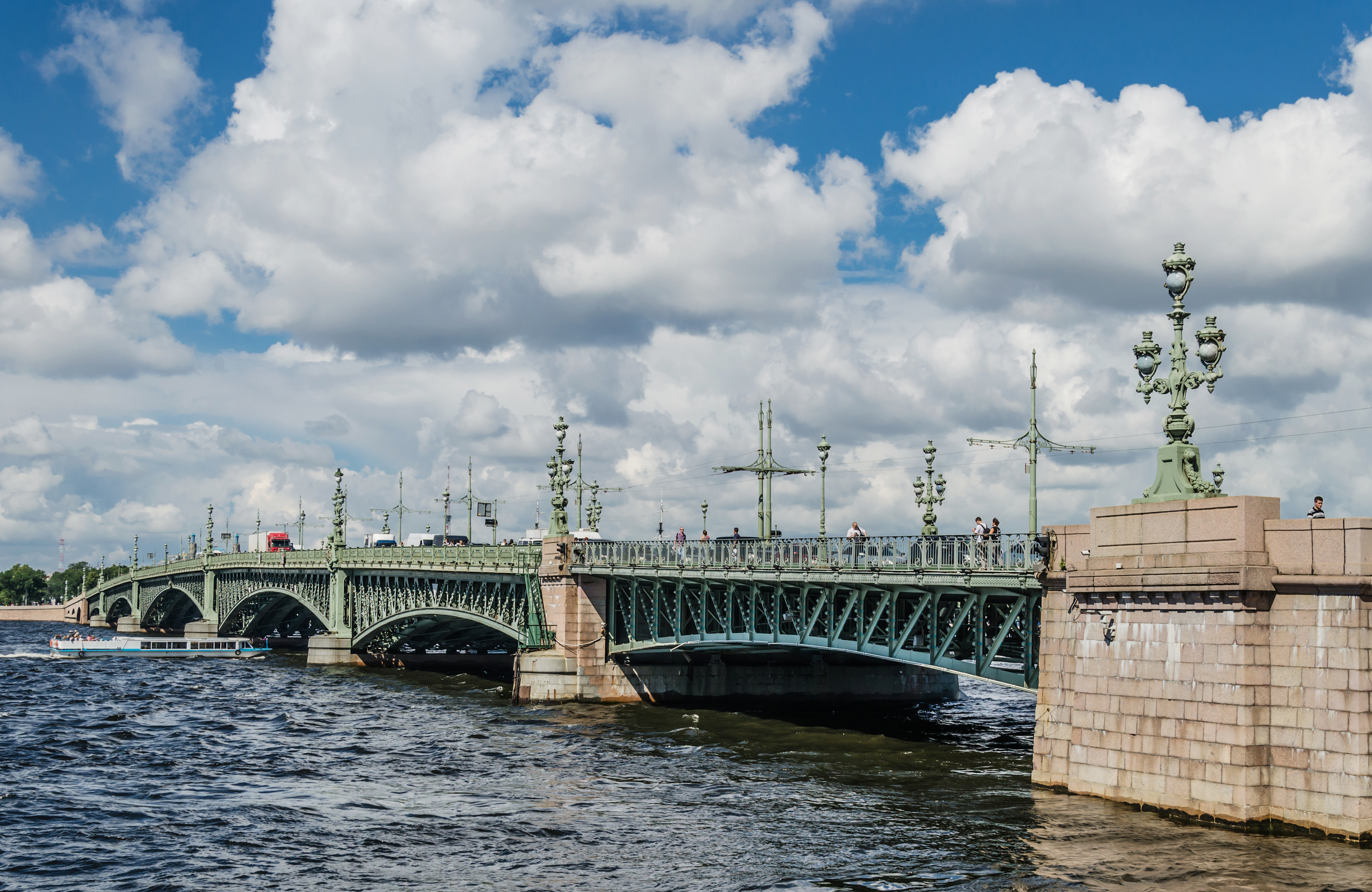
The Trinity Bridge

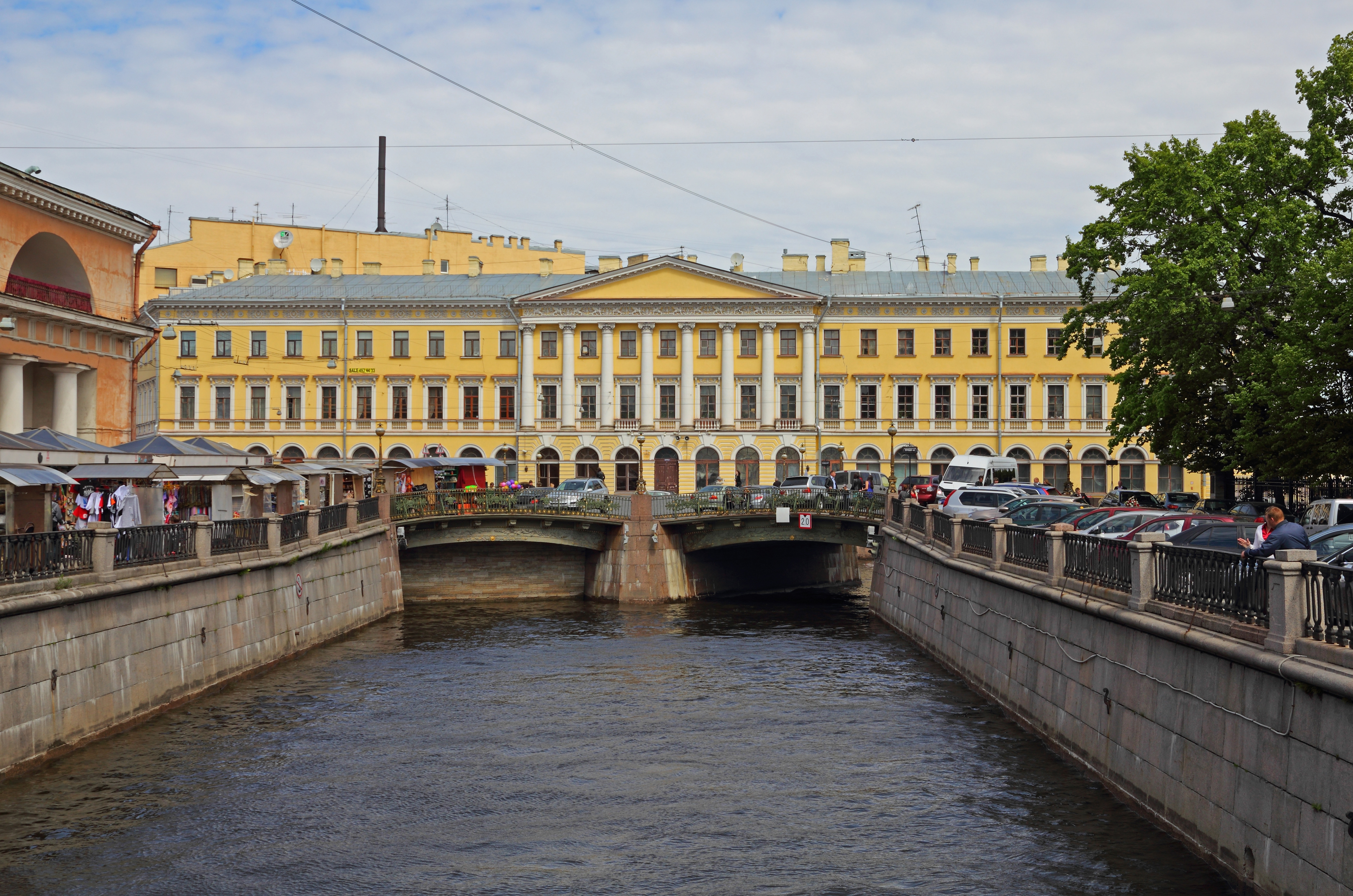
Griboyedov Canal

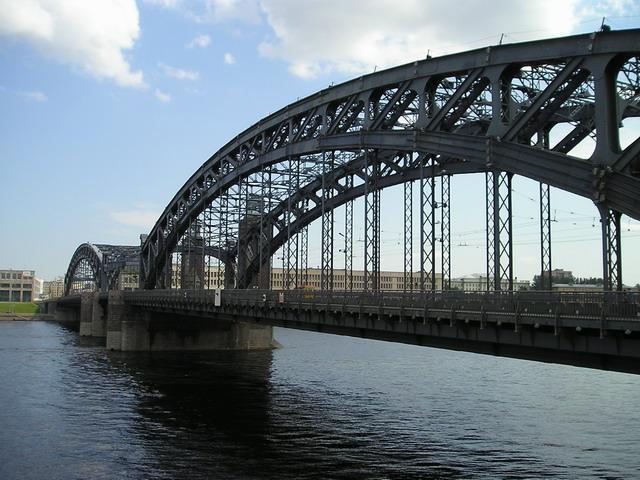
Peter the Great's bridge (former Bolsheokhtinsky)

Saint Petersburg is built on what originally were more than 100 islands created by a maze of rivers, creeks, canals, gulfs, lakes and ponds and other bodies of water that flow into the Baltic Sea at the mouth of the Neva river.

Peter the Great designed the city as another Amsterdam and Venice, with canals instead of streets and citizens skilful in sailing. Initially, there were only about ten bridges constructed in the city, mainly across ditches and minor creeks. According to Peter's plans, in the summer months, the citizens were supposed to move around in boats, and in the winter months when the water froze to move in sledges. However, after Peter's death, new bridges were built as it was a much easier way of transportation. Temporary pontoon bridges were built across Neva in the summertime. The largest temporary bridge across the Bolshaya Neva was in operation from 1727 to 1850.

The first permanent bridge of bricks and stones across the main waters of Bolshaya Neva river was the Lieutenant Schmidt Bridge, built from 1843 to 1850, and opened in 1850.

Today, there are 342 bridges over canals and rivers of various sizes, styles and constructions, built at different periods. Over 800 smaller bridges over smaller ponds and streams are gracing public parks and gardens.

Thanks to the intricate web of canals, Saint Petersburg is often called the "Venice of the North" which is a popular poetic name for the northern capital.

== Palaces of the Tsars ==
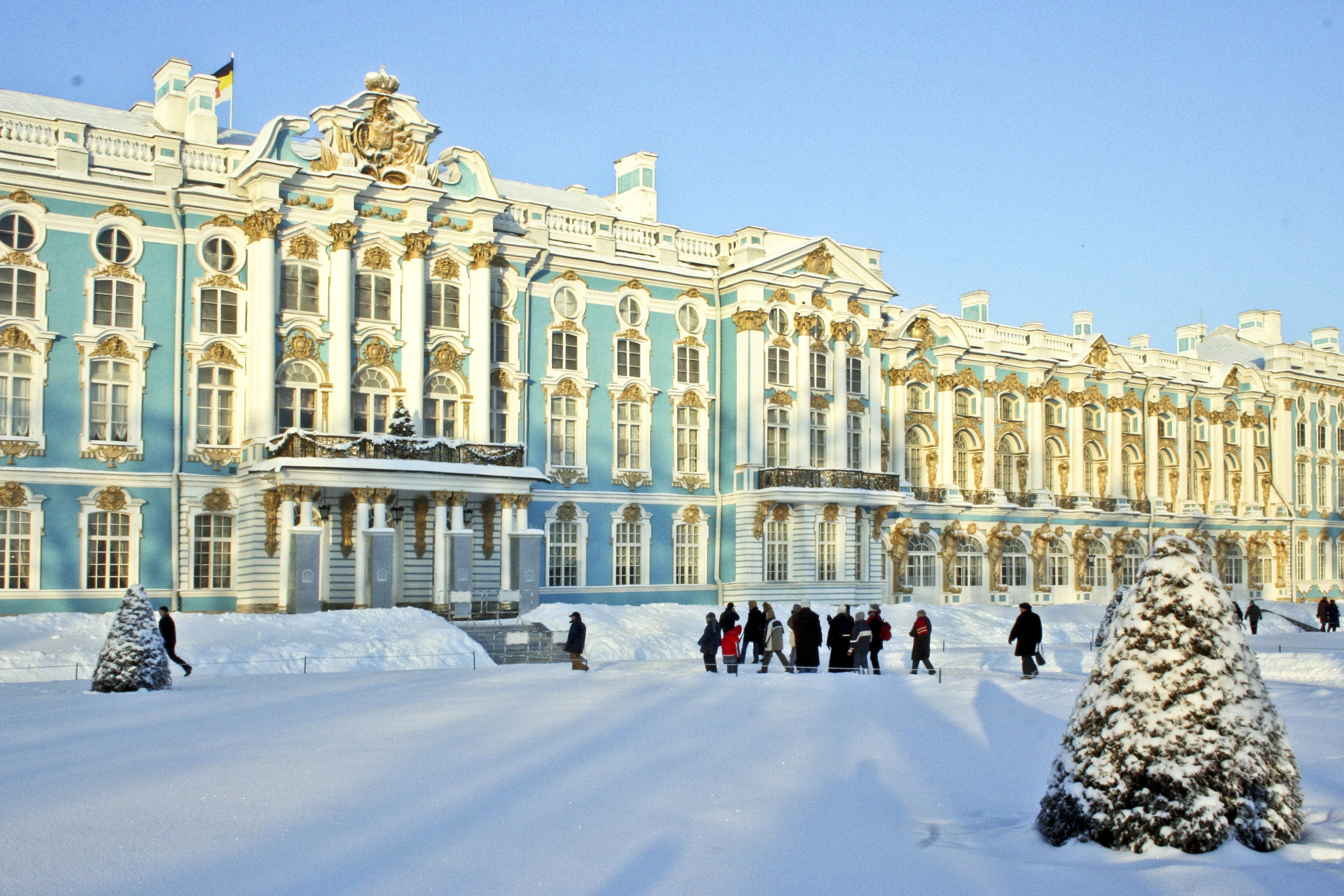
Catherine Palace in Tsarskoe Selo

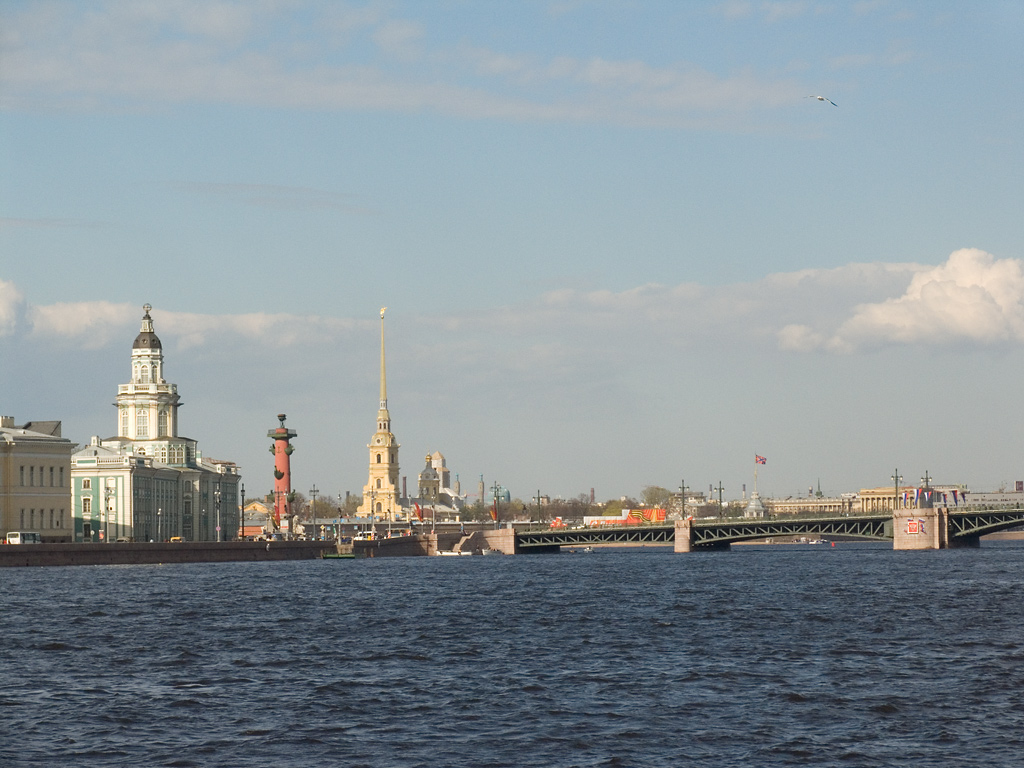
Kunstkamera, Palace Bridge, a rostral column and the spire of Peter and Paul Cathedral

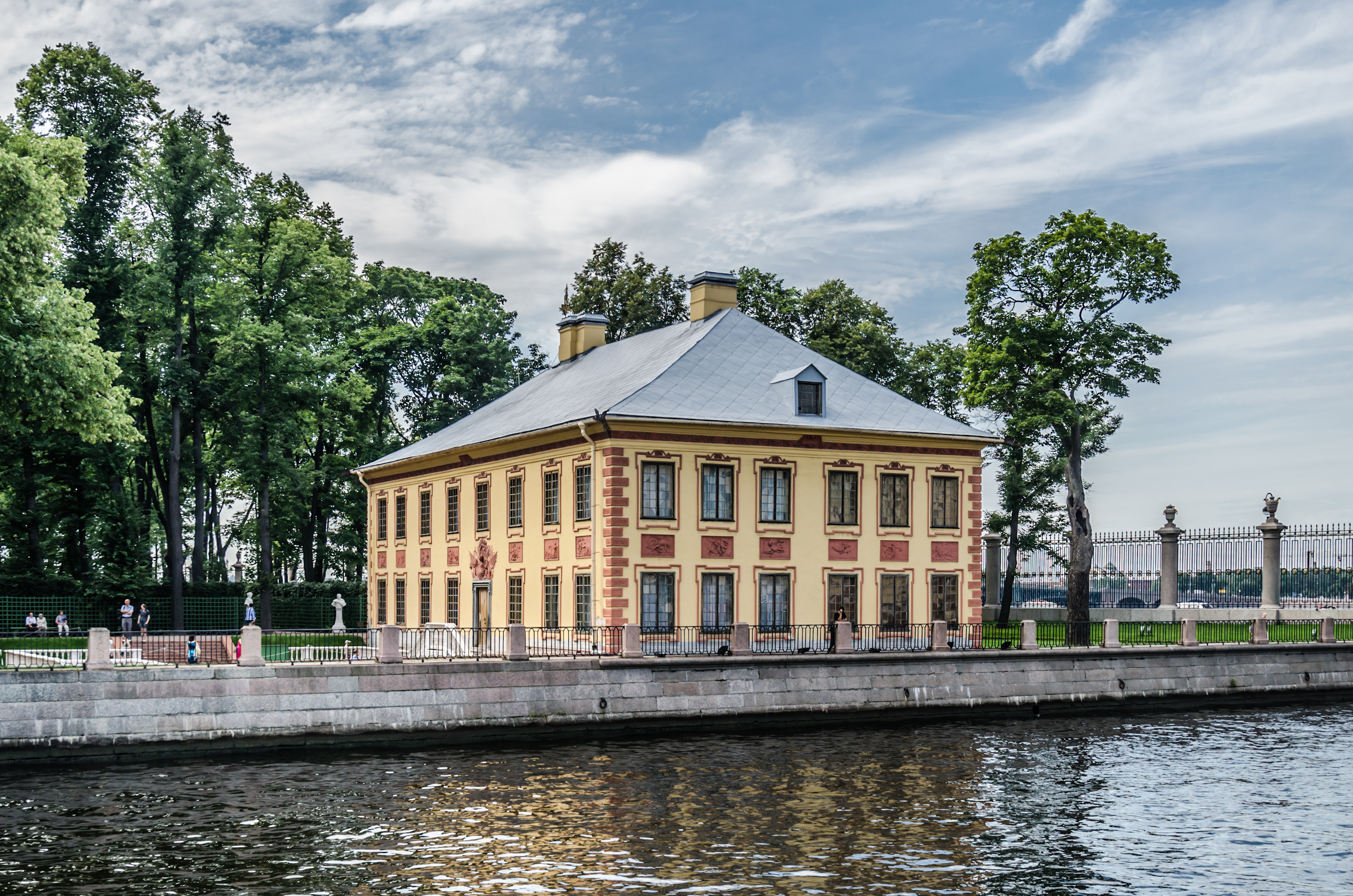
Summer Palace of Peter the Great

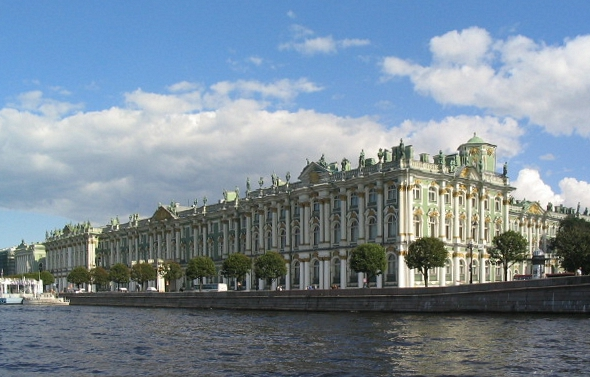
Winter Palace

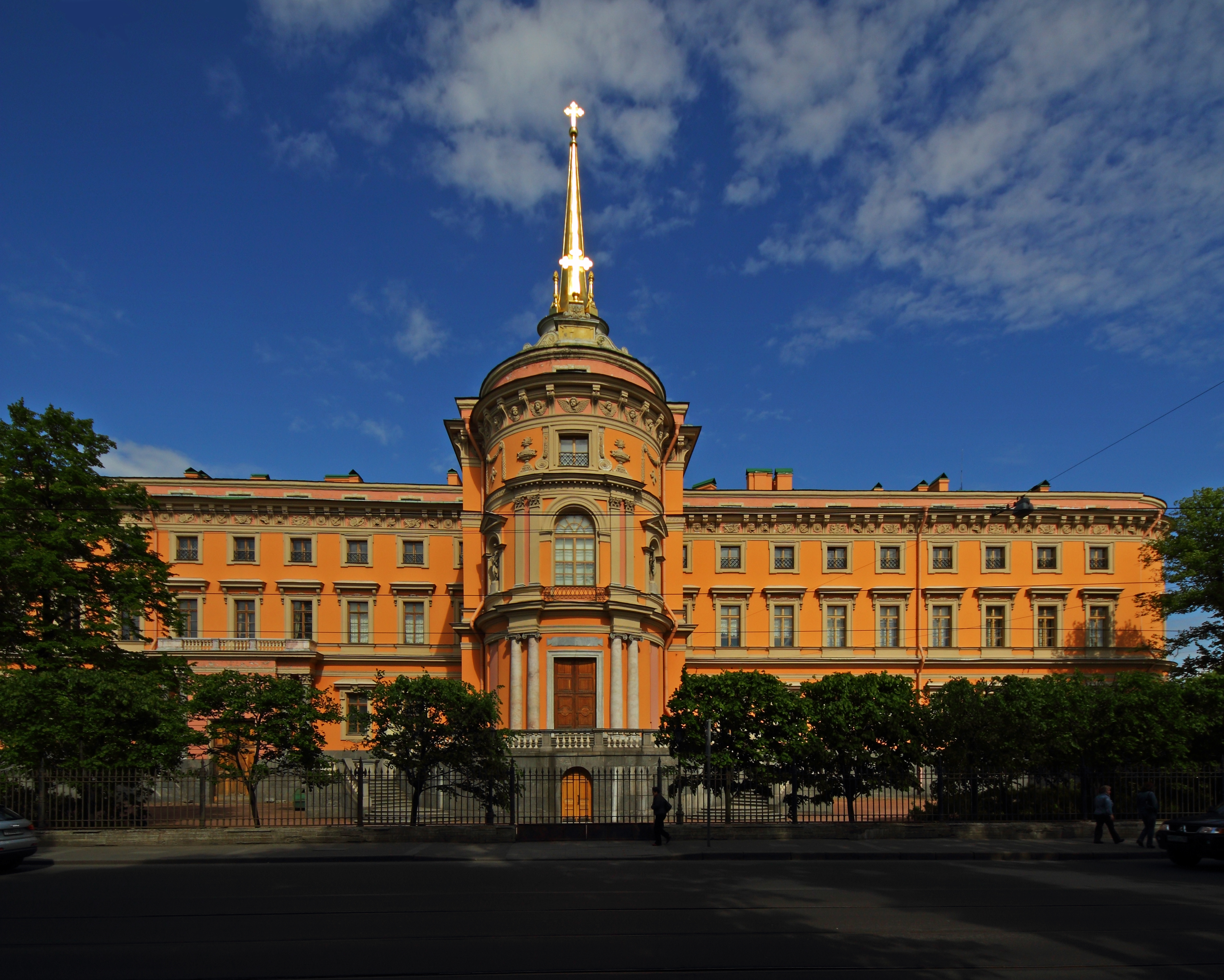
St. Michael's Castle

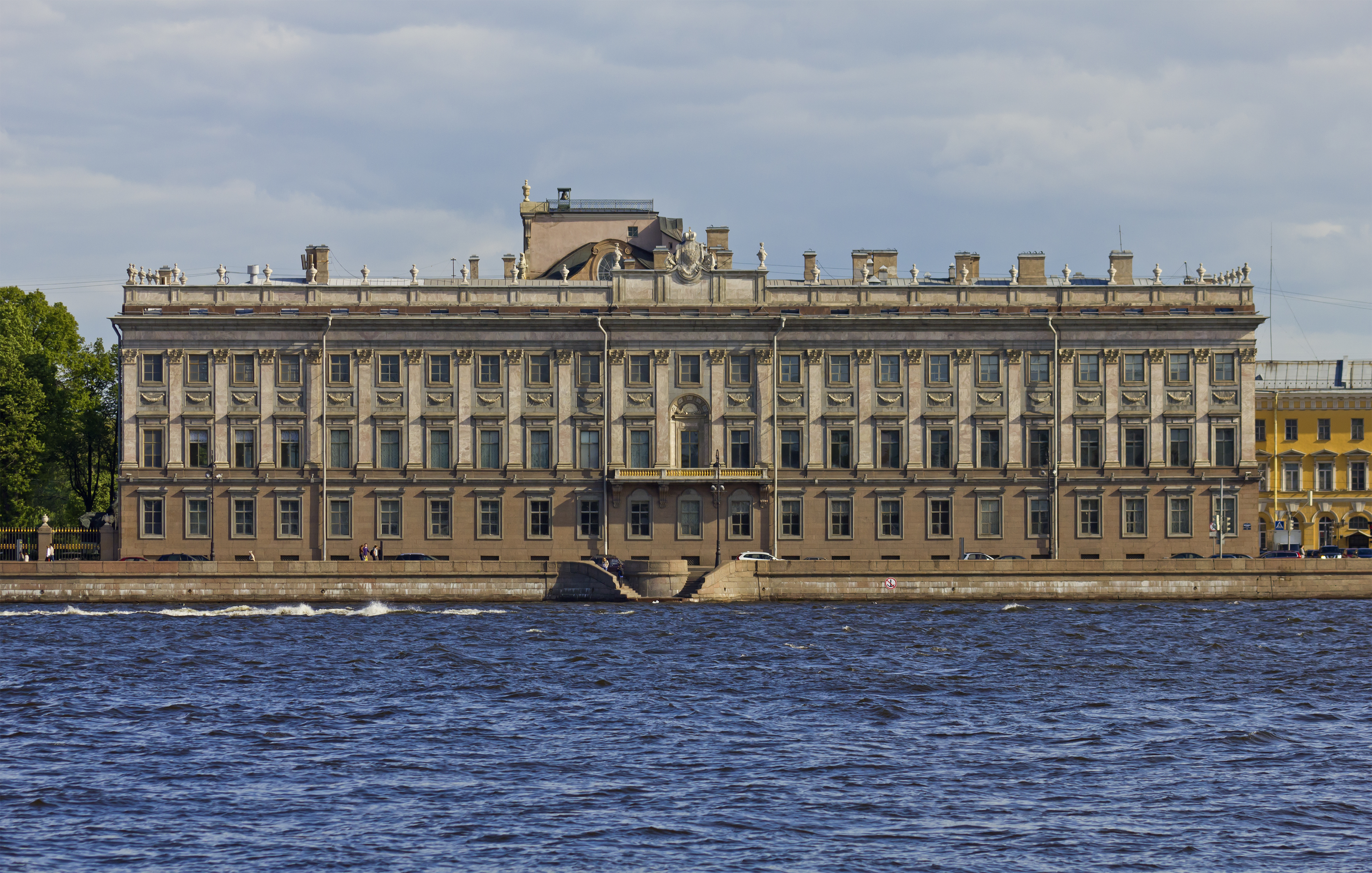
Façade of the Larger Marble Palace. For a night view see here.

Saint Petersburg is known as the city of palaces. One of the earliest of these is the Summer Palace, a modest house built for Peter I in the Summer Garden (1710–1714). Much more imposing are the baroque residences of his associates, such as the Kikin Hall and the Menshikov Palace on the Neva Embankment, constructed from designs by Domenico Trezzini over the years 1710 to 1716. A residence adjacent to the Menshikov palace was redesigned for Peter II and now houses the State University.

The baroque Winter Palace (1754–1762) is a vast stately building with over 600 rooms and dazzlingly luxurious interiors, now housing the Hermitage Museum. The same architect, Bartolomeo Rastrelli, was also responsible for three residences in the vicinity of the Nevsky Prospekt: the Stroganov Palace (1752–1754, is now a branch of the State Russian Museum, the Vorontsov palace (1749–1757, now a military school), and the Anichkov Palace (1741–1750, many times rebuilt, now a palace for extracurricular schooling). Other baroque palaces include the Sheremetev house on the Fontanka embankment (also called the Fountain House), and the Beloselsky-Belozersky Palace (1846–1848) on the Nevsky Prospekt, formerly a residence of the Grand Duke Sergey Aleksandrovich.

St Michael's (or Engineers') Castle, a Neoclassical palace, was constructed for Emperor Paul in 1797–1801 to replace the earlier Summer Palace. The Tauride Palace of Prince Potemkin (1783–1789), situated near the Smolny Institute, used to be a seat of the first Russian parliament, and now the Assembly of Independent States. Just two blocks from the Hermitage buildings is the Marble Palace, commissioned by Count Orlov and built in 1768–1785 from 44 various sorts of marble to a Neoclassical design by Antonio Rinaldi, it is now part of the State Russian Museum. The Mikhailovsky Palace (1819–1825), famed for its opulent interiors and named after its first owner, Grand Duke Mikhail Pavlovich, now houses the main collections of the Russian Museum. Also designed in the Neoclassical style is the Yusupov's Moyka palace (built in the 1790s), where Rasputin was killed by Prince Yusupov. Other palaces are the Razumovsky palace (1762–1766); the Shuvalov palace (1830–1838); and the Yelagin Palace (1818–1822), a sumptuous summer dacha of the imperial family, situated on the Yelagin Island. The last Royal residences were built for Nicholas I's children: the Mariinsky Palace (1839–1844), located just opposite St Isaac's Cathedral, now houses the Saint Petersburg City Legislature and Offices of Representatives, the Nicholas Palace (1853–61), and the New Mikhaylovsky Palace (1857-1861). All major palaces now house numerous state and private museums and various branches of the government.

== Cathedrals and temples ==
While many cathedrals and buildings formerly owned by churches and monasteries still belong to the Russian government, since their seizure in 1917, some were eventually returned to congregations. The largest cathedral in the city is St Isaac's Cathedral, said to have the largest gold-plated dome in the world. It was constructed 1818–1858 under the supervision of architects Auguste de Montferrand and Vasily Stasov.

The Kazan Cathedral on the Nevsky Prospekt was modeled after St Peter's, Vatican in the Empire style.

The Church of the Savior on Blood (1883–1907), is a monument in the old Russian style which marks the spot of Alexander II's assassination.

The Peter and Paul Cathedral (1712–1732), a long-time symbol of the city, contains the sepulchers of Peter the Great and other Russian emperors. The St. Nicholas Cathedral and the Great Choral Synagogue are near the Mariinsky Opera Theatre. Most cathedrals and temples operate today as places of worship as well as museums, and there are numerous other places of worship in all major religions.

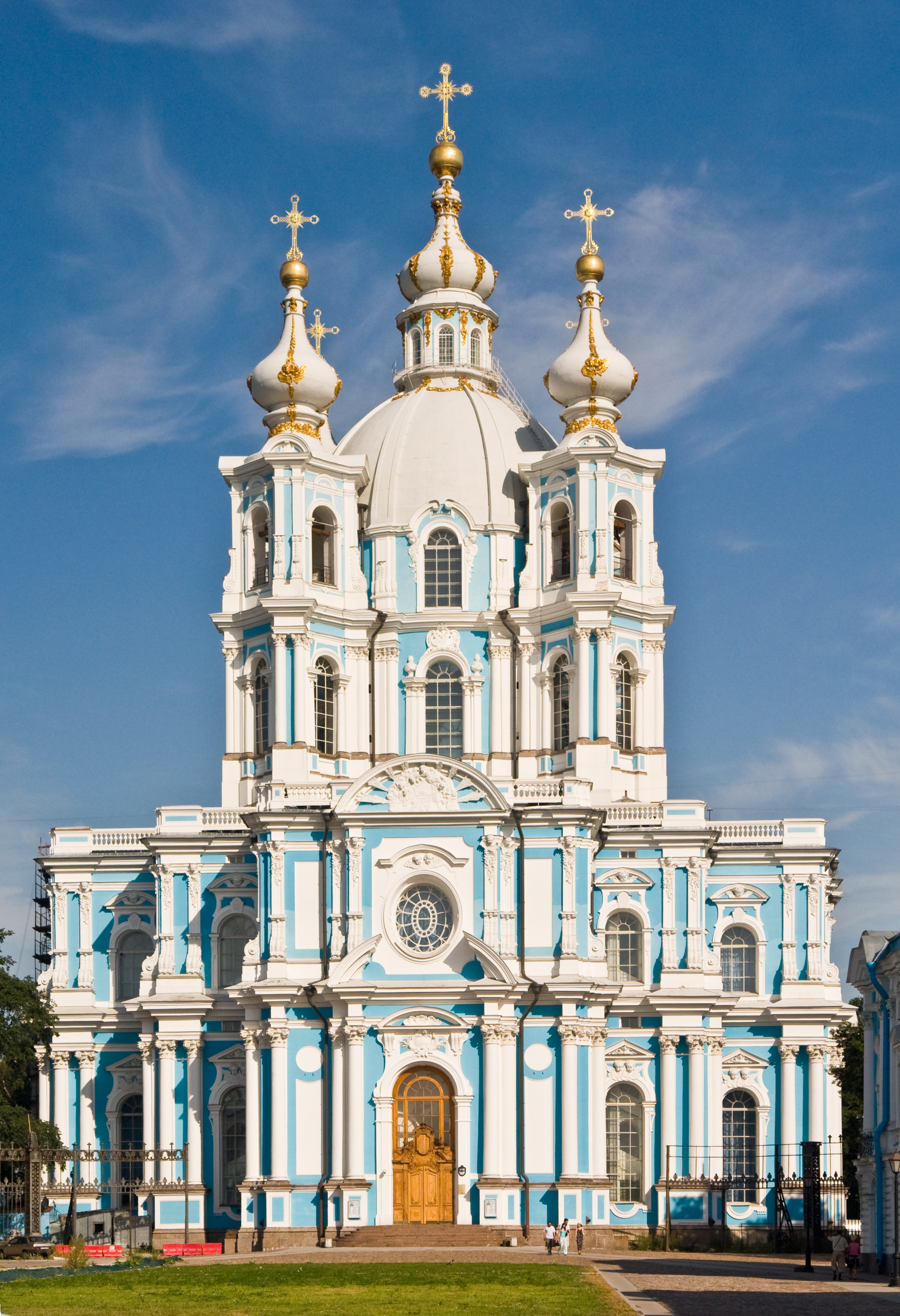
Smolny Cathedral

Of baroque structures, the grandest is the white-and-blue Smolny Convent (1748–1764), later the Smolny Institute, designed by Bartolomeo Rastrelli, but never completed. It is followed by the St. Nicholas Naval Cathedral (1753–1762), a lofty structure dedicated to the Russian Navy, the outside being covered with plaques to sailors lost at sea. The church of Sts. Simeon and Anna (1731–1734), St. Sampson Cathedral (1728–1740), St. Pantaleon Church (1735–1739), and St. Andrew's Cathedral (1764–1780) are also notable.

The Neoclassical churches are numerous. Many of them are intended to dominate squares, like St. Vladimir's Cathedral (1769–1789), not to be confused with the church of Our Lady of Vladimir (1761–1783). The Transfiguration Cathedral (1827–29) and the Trinity Cathedral (1828–1835, fire-damaged) were both designed by Vasily Stasov. Smaller churches include the Konyushennaya (1816–1823), also by Stasov, the "Easter Cake" church (1785–1787), noted for its droll appearance, St Catherine church on the Vasilievsky Island (1768–1771), and numerous non-Orthodox churches on the Nevsky Prospekt.

The Alexander Nevsky Monastery, intended to house the relics of St. Alexander Nevsky, is graced by the Holy Trinity Cathedral and five smaller churches in various styles. The monastery is also one of three main centers of Christian education in Russia, having the Russian Orthodox Academy and Seminary and the residence of the St. Petersburg Patriarch. It is also remarkable for its four cemeteries, the Lazarevskoe, Kazachye, Nikolskoe and Tikhvin, with graves of such dignitaries as writers Fyodor Dostoyevsky and Ivan Krylov, composers Pyotr Ilyich Tchaikovsky and Modest Mussorgsky, pianist Anton Rubinstein, director Georgy Tovstonogov, actors Fyodor Stravinsky, Vera Komissarzhevskaya, Nikolay Simonov, mayor Anatoly Sobchak and many other notable Russians.

The Grand Choral Synagogue of St. Petersburg is the second largest in Europe. It was opened in 1893, with the building permit obtained in 1869 from the Tsar Alexander II. The Small Synagogue was opened in 1886. On 5 Tamuz 5761 (June 26, 2001), the greater hall ("Bolshoi Zal" in Russian) was reopened after reconstruction.

Two small churches in the early Gothic Revival style, both designed by Yuri Felten, are the Nativity of John the Baptist (1776–1781) and the Chesmenskaya (1777–1780). The late 19th-century and early 20th-century temples are designed in the Russian Revival or Byzantine Revival styles. Saint Petersburg Mosque (1909–1920), once the largest in Europe, is modeled after the Gur-e Amir Mosque in Samarkand.

St Petersburg Buddhist temple was the first in Europe. Construction was funded by subscriptions of the Dalai Lama and Russian and Mongolian Buddhists; the structure was inaugurated in the presence of Itigilov in 1914 and served as a valuable resource to transient Buryats, Kalmyks and other Buddhists during World War I. It did not function from 1935 to 1991, when the lamas were exiled to gulags, and the temple and its grounds were used for secular purposes. In 1991 the St. Petersburg datsan was reopened for worship.

== Museums and popular sites ==
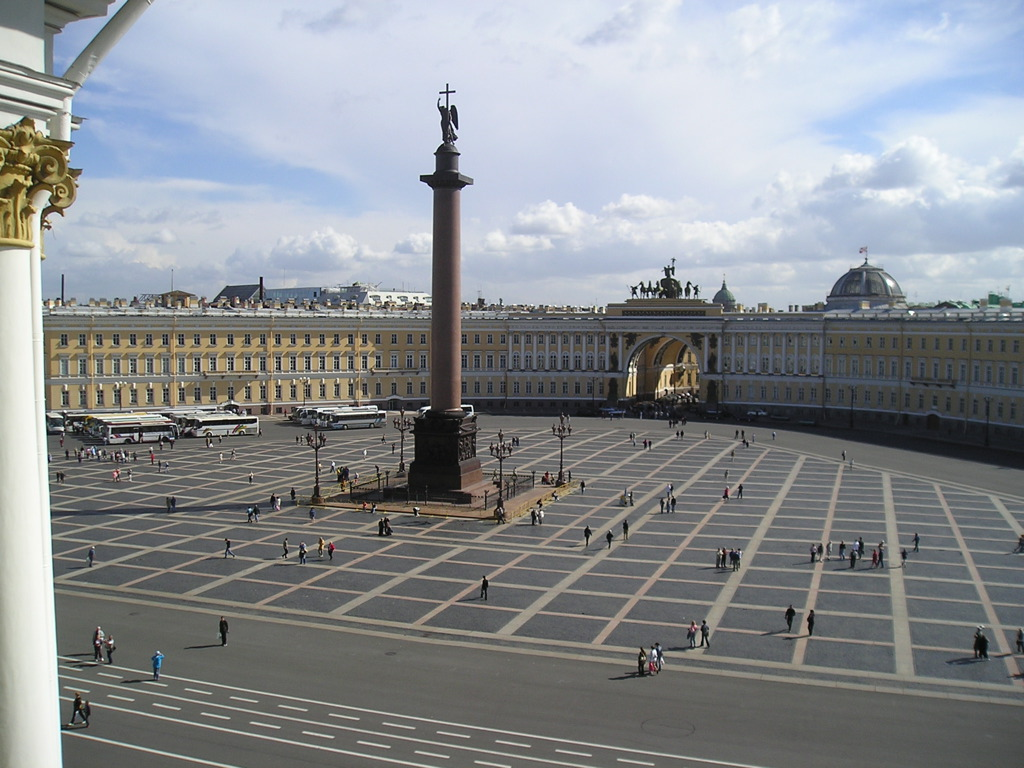
Palace Square with the Alexander Column, view from the Winter Palace

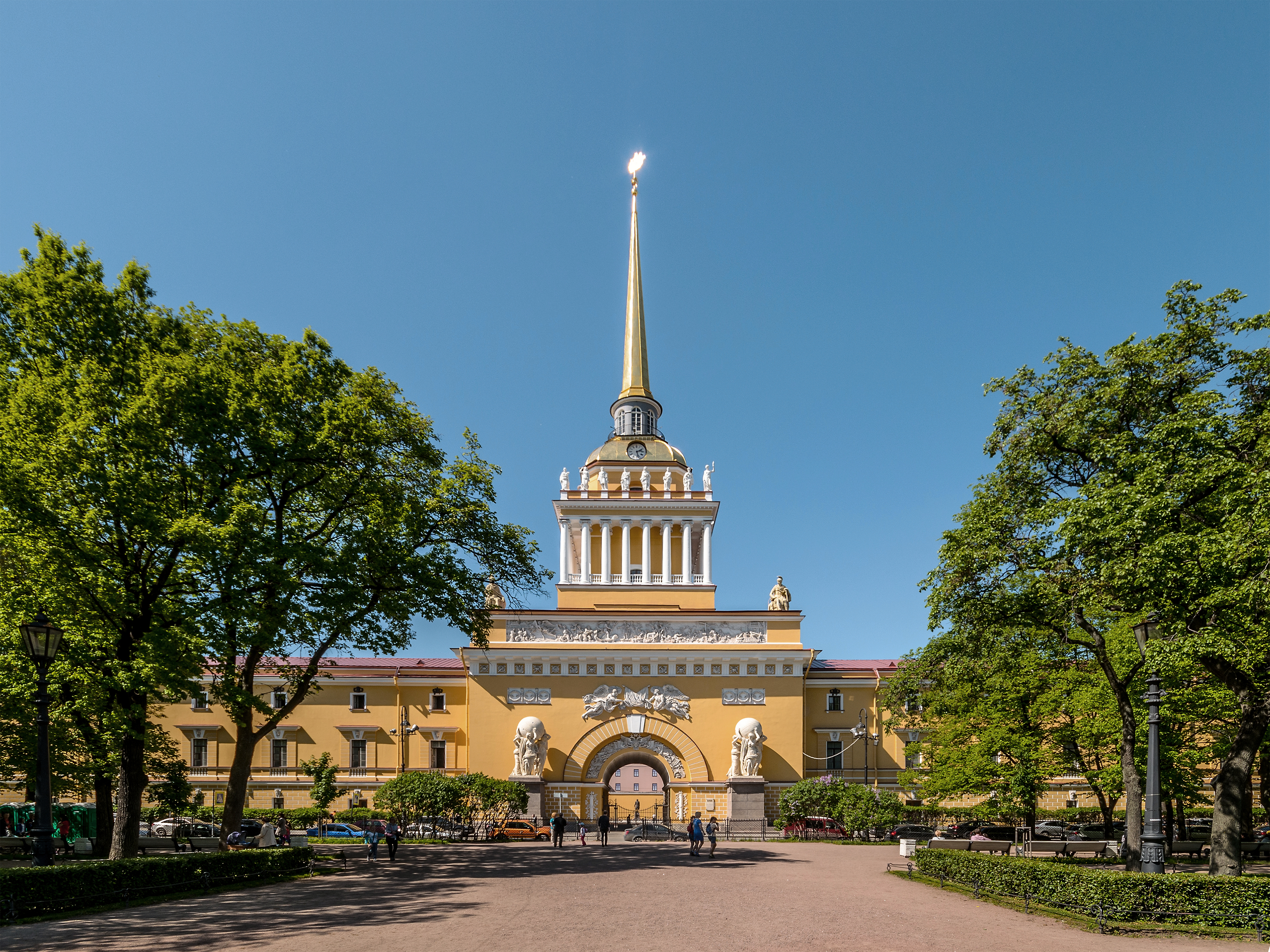
Spire of the Russian Admiralty

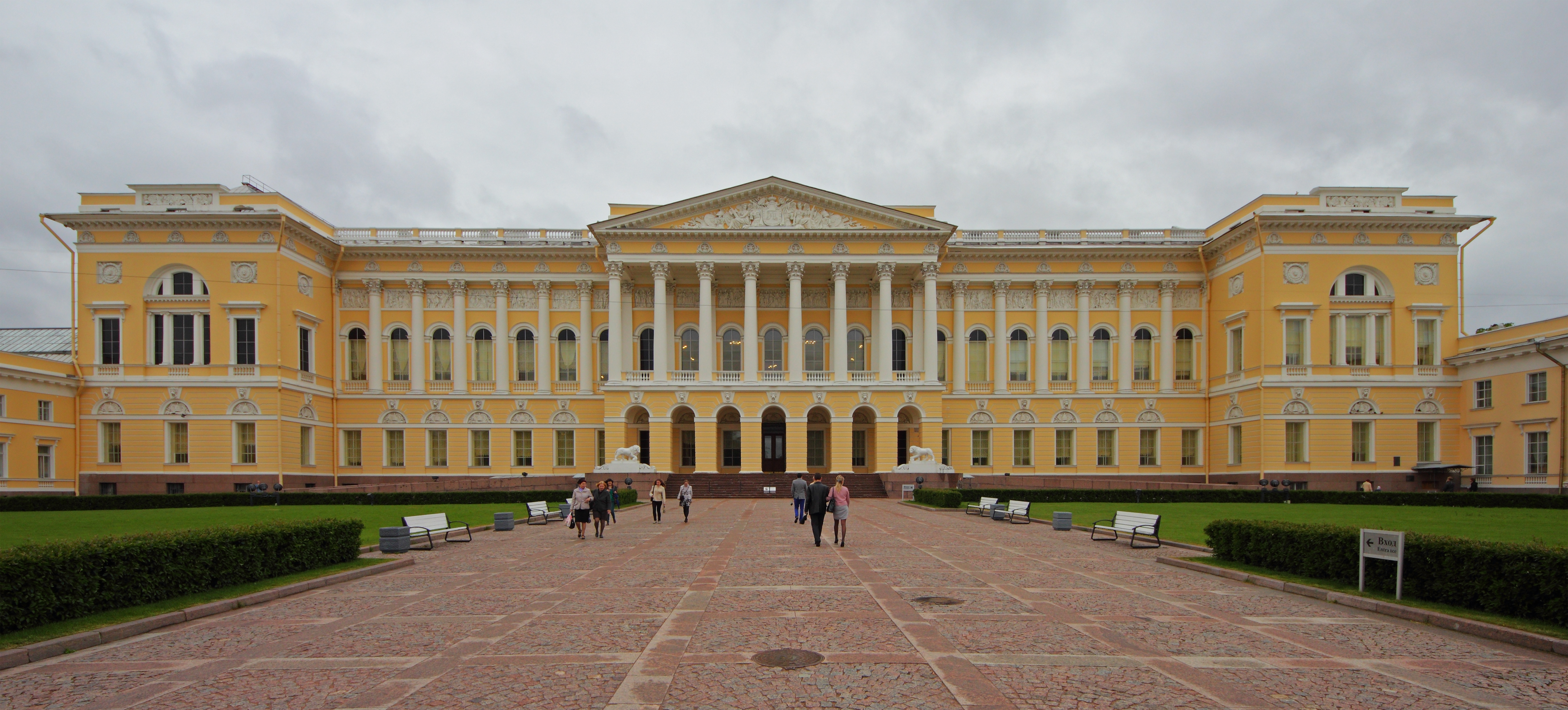
The State Russian Museum, former Mikhailovsky Palace

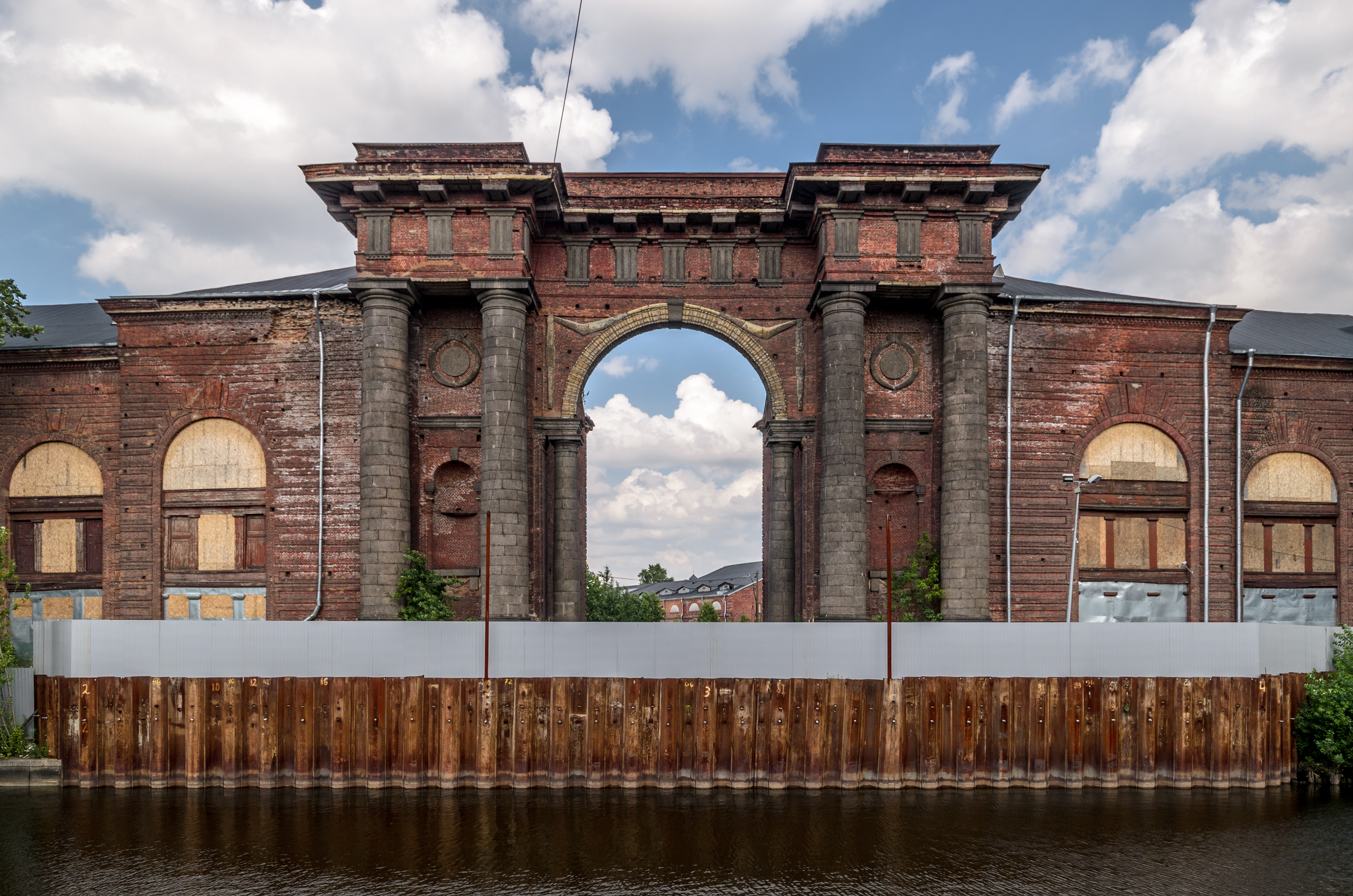
Arch of the New Holland Island

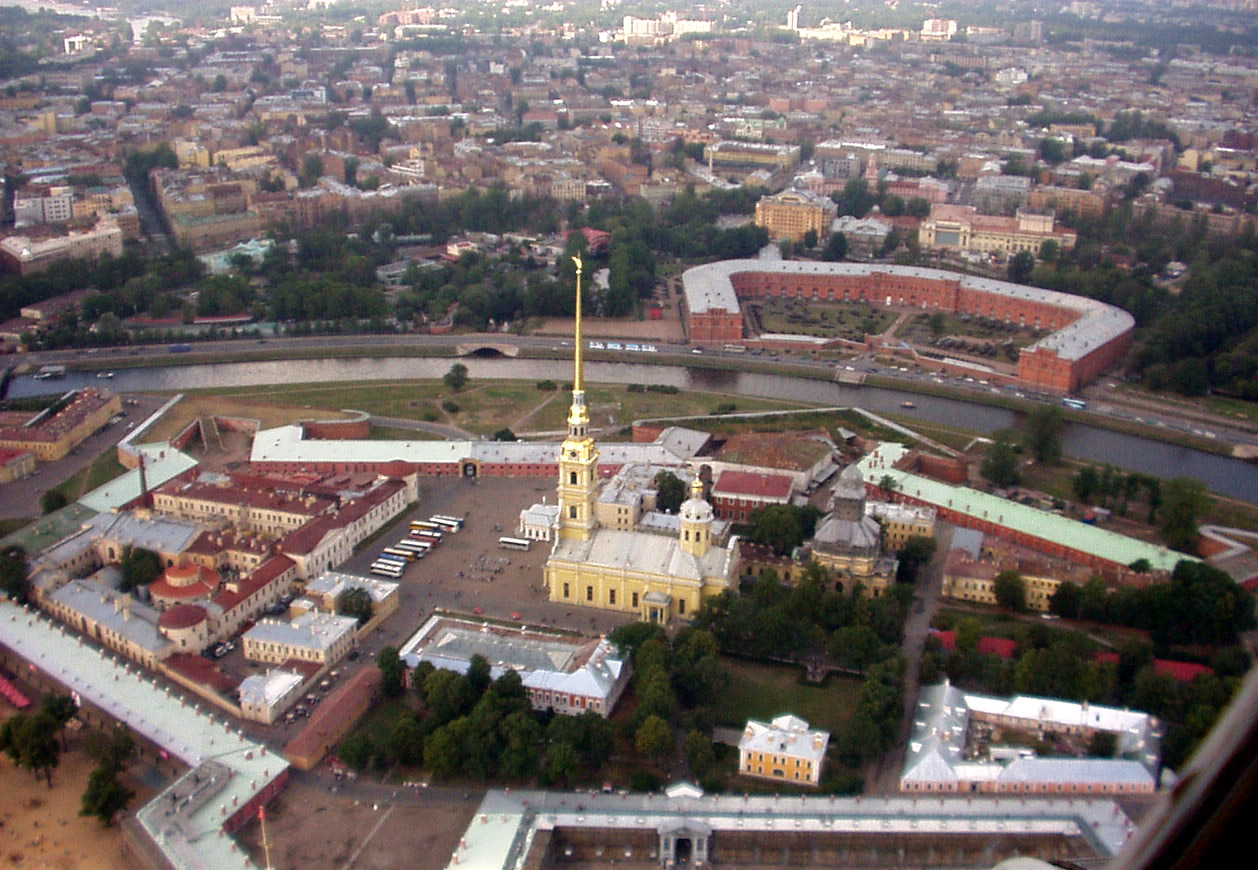
Peter and Paul Fortress

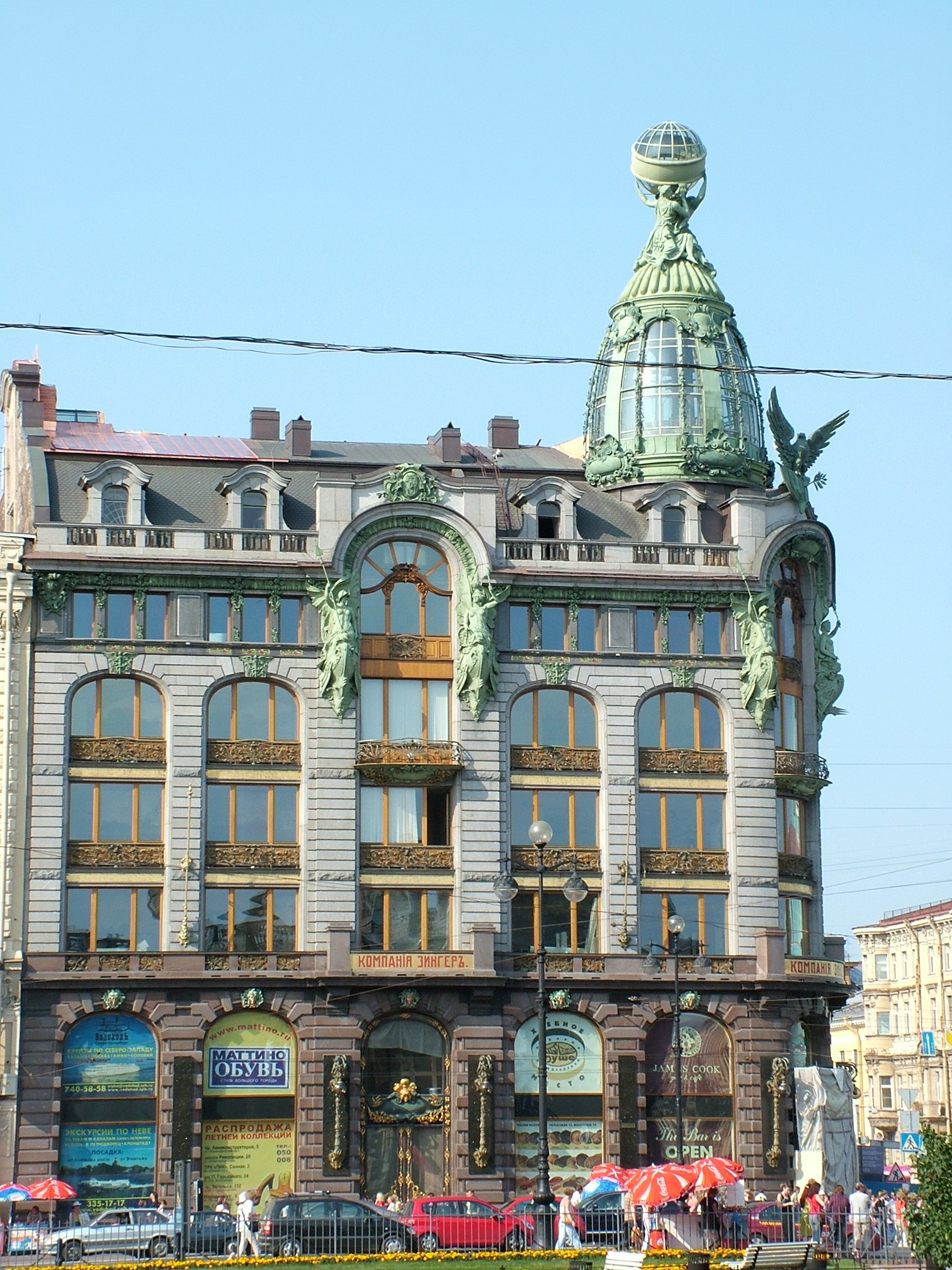
Former Singer's House (now a popular bookstore "House of Books")

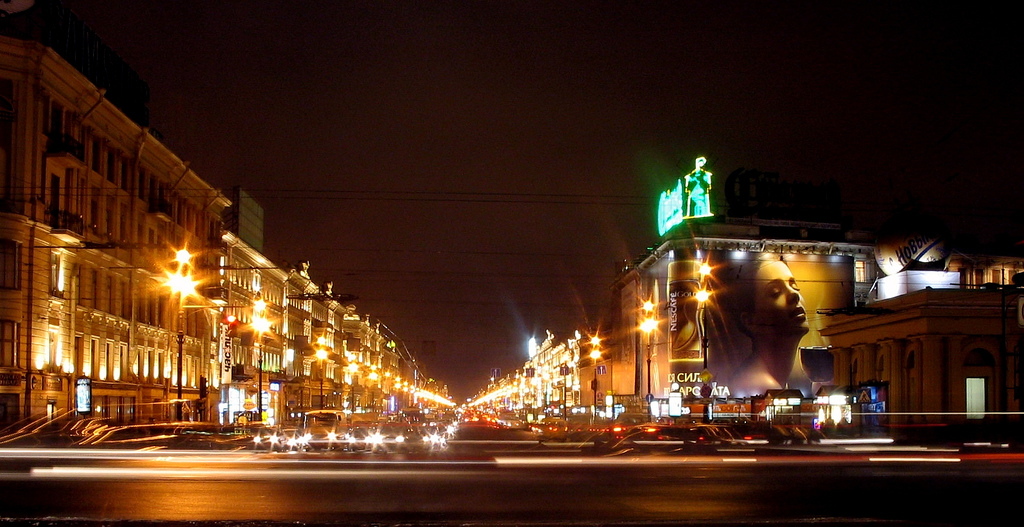
Nevsky Prospekt at night

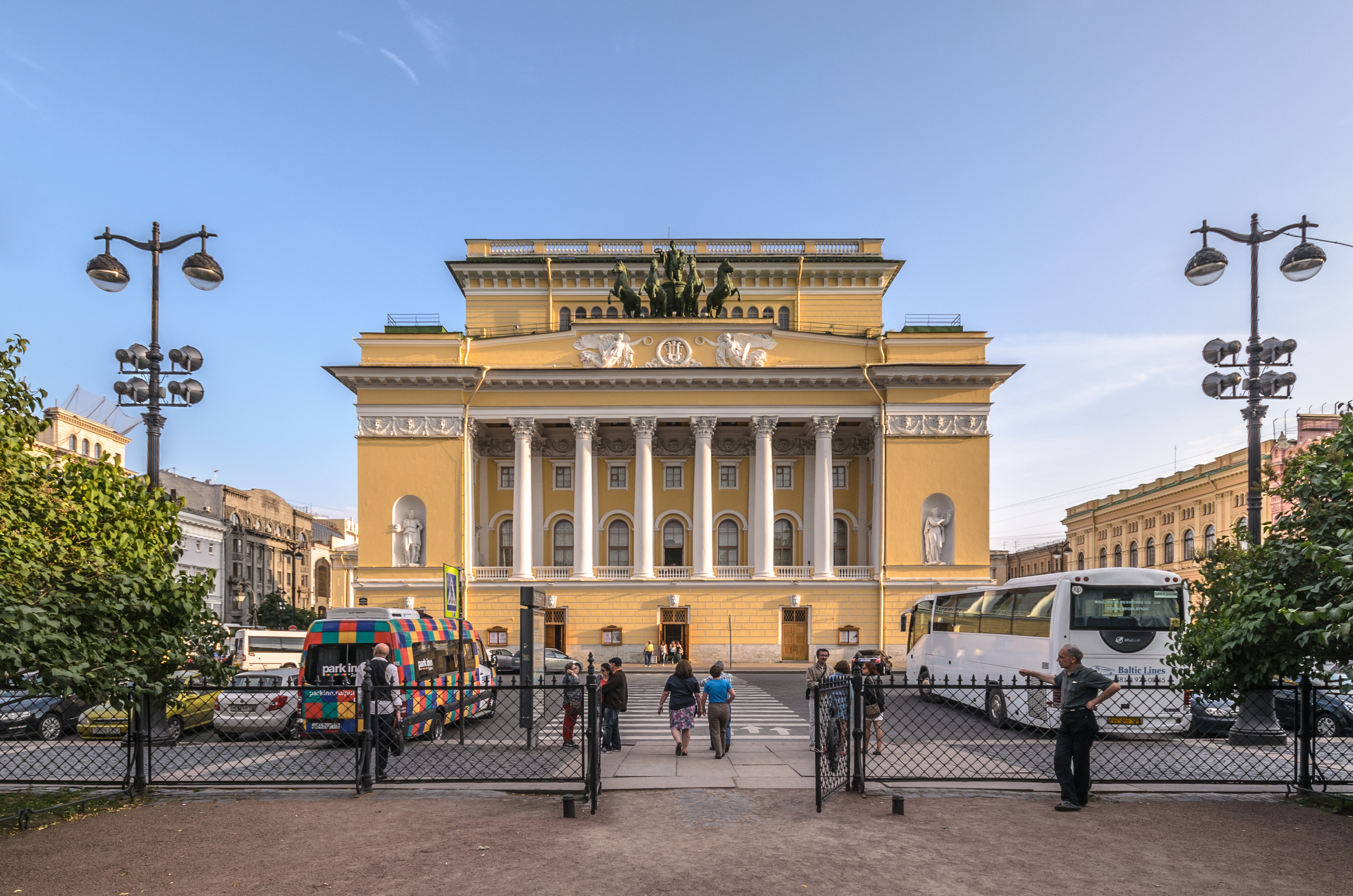
Alexandrine Theatre is the oldest Russian Drama theatre, named after Pushkin

The ensemble of Peter and Paul Fortress with the Peter and Paul Cathedral takes dominant position on the right bank of the Neva river, across the Winter Palace in the center of the city. A boardwalk was built along a portion of the fortress wall, giving visitors a clear view of the city across the river to the south. On the other bank of the Neva, the spit (Strelka) of the Vasilievsky Island is graced by the Old Saint Petersburg Stock Exchange (Bourse) (1805–1810), an important landmark in the style of the Greek Revival, is now home of the Russian Naval Museum. The spit of the Vasilievsky Island is designed as a classic lawn-park on the waterfront, and is highlighted by two tall and colorful Rostral Columns, decorated with statues and prows of battleships. This is a traditional place for music festivals and public events, such as the White Nights Festival.

The most famous of St. Petersburg's museums is the Hermitage, one of the world's largest and richest collections of Western European art. Its holdings were originally exhibited in the Greek Revival building (1838–1852) by Leo von Klenze, now called the New Hermitage. But the first Russian museum was established by Peter the Great in the Kunstkammer, erected in 1718–1734 on the opposite bank of the Neva River and formerly a home to the Russian Academy of Sciences. Other important exhibitions are hosted by the State Russian Museum, the Russian Museum of Ethnography (1900–1911), Stieglitz Museum of Applied Arts (1885–1895), the Suvorov Museum of Military History (1901–1904), and the Political History Museum (1904–06).

The imperial government institutions were housed in stately buildings, such as the General Staff Building on the Palace Square (1820–1827), with a huge triumphal arch in the centre, the Senate and Synod buildings on the Senate Square (1827–1843), the Imperial Cabinet (1803–1805) and the City Duma (1784–87) on the Nevsky Prospekt, the Assignation Bank (1783–1790), the Customs Office (1829–1832), and the masterpiece of Russian architecture: the Admiralty (1806–1823), one of the city's most conspicuous landmarks. Most of Imperial palaces and state buildings were designed by reputable architects invited by the Russian Tsar's from European capitals, such as Domenico Trezzini, Giacomo Quarenghi, Thomas de Thomon, Bartolomeo Rastrelli, Carlo Rossi and other foreign architects who settled in St. Petersburg and worked on numerous large-scale projects. Next came the generation of Russian-born architects and engineers, such as Zakharov, Stasov, Voronikhin, Starov, and other Russians who studied abroad and returned to work in St. Petersburg.

The former imperial capital is rich in science and educational institutions. Saint Petersburg State University is based on Vasilievsky Island and in Peterhof. The university's baroque edifice of Twelve Collegia (1722–1744) was designed by Domenico Trezzini. The Academy of Arts (1764–1788) overlooks a quayside adorned with genuine Egyptian sphinxes. The Smolny Institute (1806–1808), originally the first school for Russian women, was Lenin's headquarters during the Russian Revolution of 1917, is now the office of the Governor. The Catherine's Institute (1804–1807), also designed by Quarenghi, is now the Russian National Library. Another Neoclassical building by Quarenghi, a roomy Horse Guards Riding School (1804–1807), is now the Central Exhibition Hall.

Some historic shops and storehouses are landmarks in their own right, such as the monumental New Holland Arch (1779–1787) and adjacent walls of the New Holland isle. The Merchant Court on the Nevsky Prospekt (1761–1785), also designed by Jean-Baptiste Vallin de la Mothe, houses the largest extant 18th-century shopping mall and supermarket in the world, now rebuilt and updated with several coffee bars and a metro station. Nearby are the Circular Market, erected in 1785–1790, and the Passage, one of the great covered arcades of the mid-19th century.

Nevsky Prospekt is the main avenue of St. Petersburg connecting the Winter Palace with the monastery at Alexander Nevsky Lavra. Nevsky is a busy shopping destination and center of entertainment and nightlife. Shopping malls, department stores, business centers, built in a variety of styles, include the Elisseeff Emporium, the House of Books, The Passage, and more.

St Petersburg is a home to more than 50 theatres. The oldest is the Hermitage Theatre, which was a private palatial theatre of Catherine the Great, still preserving the complex stage machinery of the 18th century. The Alexandrine Theatre, built in 1828–1832 by Carlo Rossi, was named after the wife of Nicholas I. Most famous outside Russia is the Mariinsky Theatre (former Kirov Theatre of Opera and Ballet), which has been styled the capital of the world ballet. The Ciniselli Circus is one of the oldest circus buildings in the world. The Opera House at Saint Petersburg Conservatory, the first in Russia, was founded in 1861 by Anton Rubinstein and bears the name of Nikolai Rimsky-Korsakov; its alumni include Tchaikovsky, Prokofiev, and Shostakovich who also taught here.

== Monuments and sculptures ==
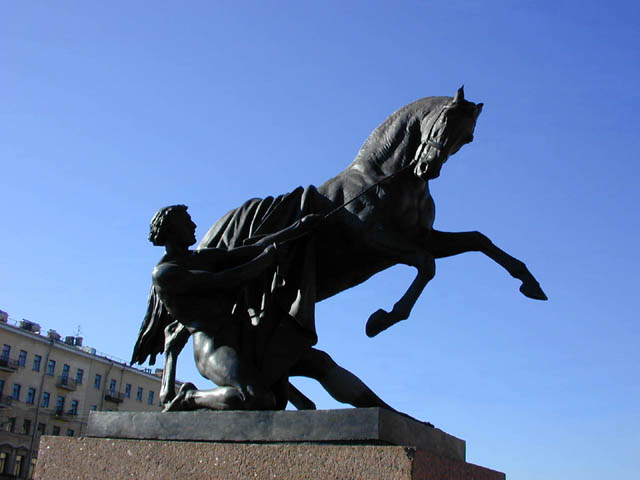
A horse tamer on the Anichkov Bridge by Peter Clodt von Jürgensburg

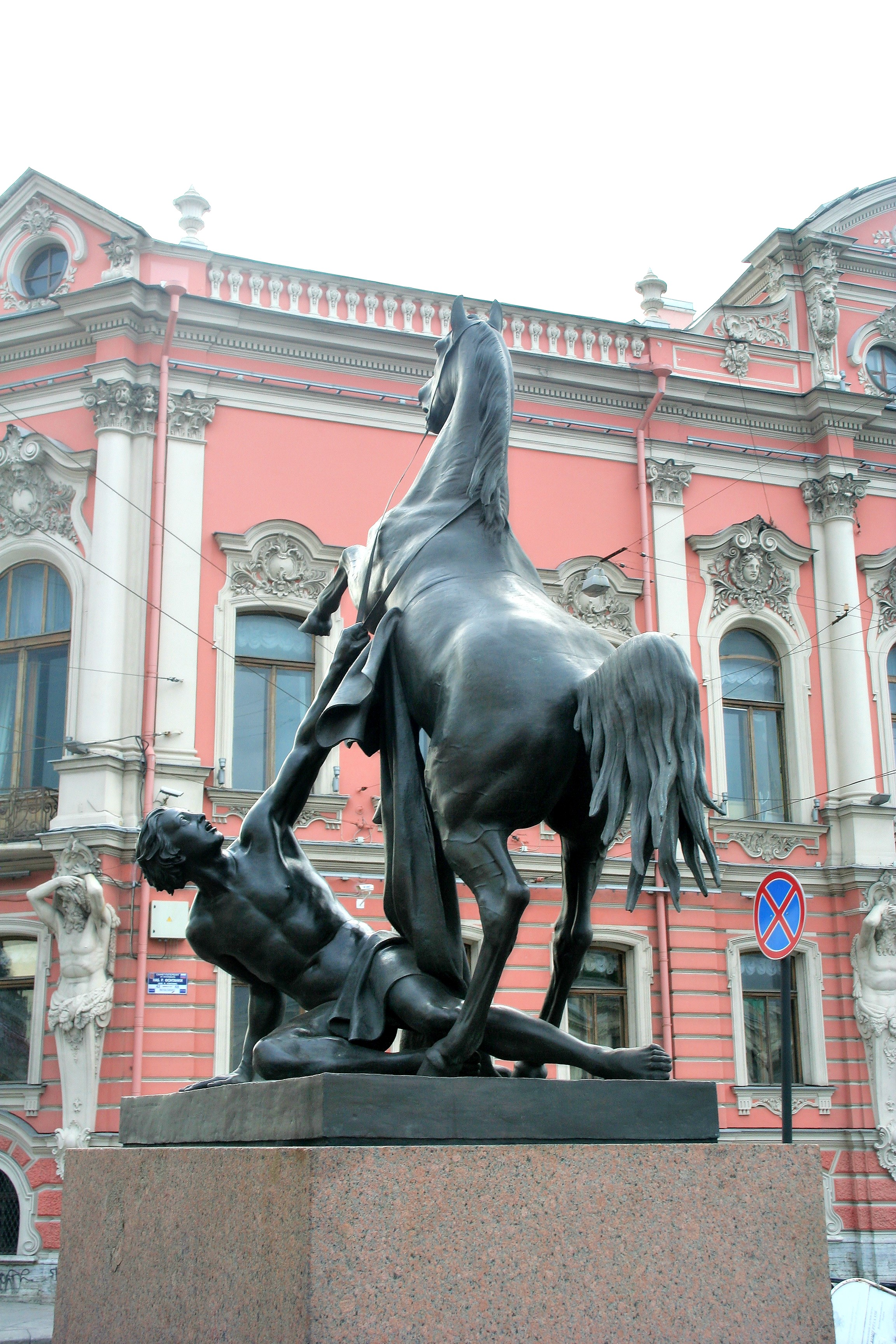
A horse tamer on the Anichkov Bridge, designed by Peter Clodt von Jürgensburg, near the Beloselsky-Belozersky Palace

Probably the most familiar symbol of St Petersburg is the equestrian statue of Peter the Great, known as the Bronze Horseman and installed in 1782 on the Senate Square. Considered the greatest masterpiece of the French-born Etienne Maurice Falconet, Aleksandr Pushkin's poem about the statue figures prominently in the Russian literature under the name of The Bronze Horseman.

The Palace Square is dominated by the Alexander Column (1830–1834), the tallest of its kind in the world and so nicely set that no attachment to the base is needed. A monument to Generalissimo Suvorov, represented as a youthful god of war, was erected in 1801 on the Field of Mars, formerly used for military parades and popular festivities. Saint Isaac's Square is graced by the Monument to Nicholas I (1856–1859), which was spared by Bolshevik authorities from destruction as the first equestrian statue in the world with merely two support points (the rear feet of the horse).

The public monuments of St Petersburg also include Mikeshin's circular statue of Catherine II on the Nevsky Avenue, fine horse statues on the Anichkov Bridge, a Rodin-like equestrian statue of Alexander III by Paolo Troubetzkoy, and the Tercentenary monument presented by France in 2003 and installed on the Sennaya Square.

Some of the most important events in the history of both the city and the Russian Empire are represented by particular monuments. The Russian victory over Napoleon, for example, was commemorated by the Narva Triumphal Gate (1827–1834), and the victory in the Russo-Turkish War, 1828-1829 — by the Moscow Triumphal Gates (1834–1838). The Piskarevskoye Cemetery was opened in 1960 as a monument to the victims of the 900-Day Siege.

== Suburban parks and palaces ==
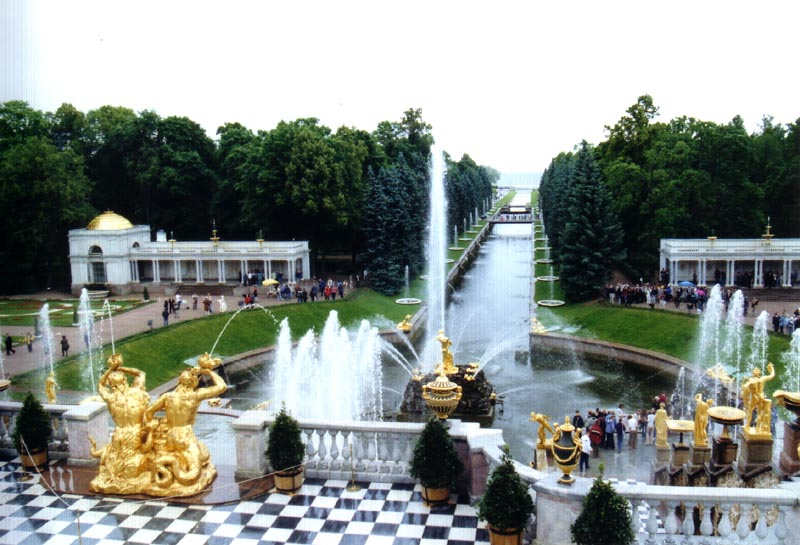
Peterhof: the Samson Fountain and Sea Channel

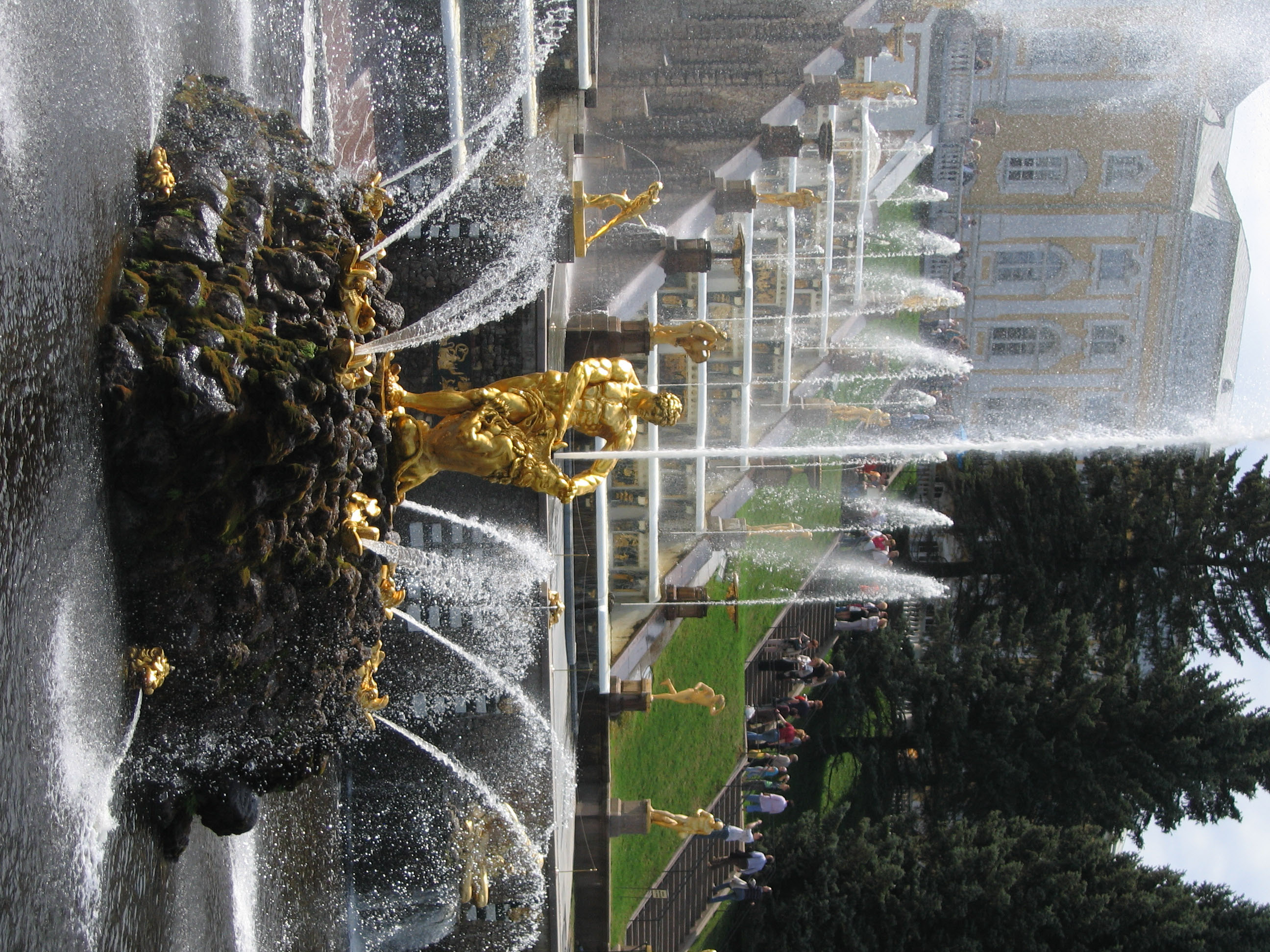
Samson and the Lion fountain in Petergof

St. Petersburg is surrounded by imperial residences, some of which are inscribed in the World Heritage list. These include: Peterhof, with the Grand Peterhof Palace and fountain cascades; Tsarskoe Selo, with the baroque Catherine Palace and the neoclassical Alexander Palace; and Pavlovsk Palace, which contains a domed palace of Emperor Paul (1782–1786) and a large English-style park.

Much of Peterhof and Tsarskoe Selo had to be restored after being blown up by the retreating Germans in 1944. Other imperial residences have yet to be revived to their former glory. Gatchina, lying 45 km southwest of St Petersburg, retains a royal castle with 600 rooms surrounded by a park. Oranienbaum, founded by Prince Menshikov, features his spacious baroque residence and the richly decorated Chinese palace. Strelna has a hunting lodge of Peter the Great and the reconstructed Constantine Palace, used for official summits of the Russian president with foreign leaders.

Another notable suburb is Kronstadt, with its 19th-century fortifications and naval monuments. Catherinehof, originally intended as a garden suburb, was engulfed by the city in the 19th century.

== See also ==
- Timeline of Saint Petersburg
