= Singer House =

House in Saint Petersburg, Russia

- Дом компании «Зингер» (in Russian)
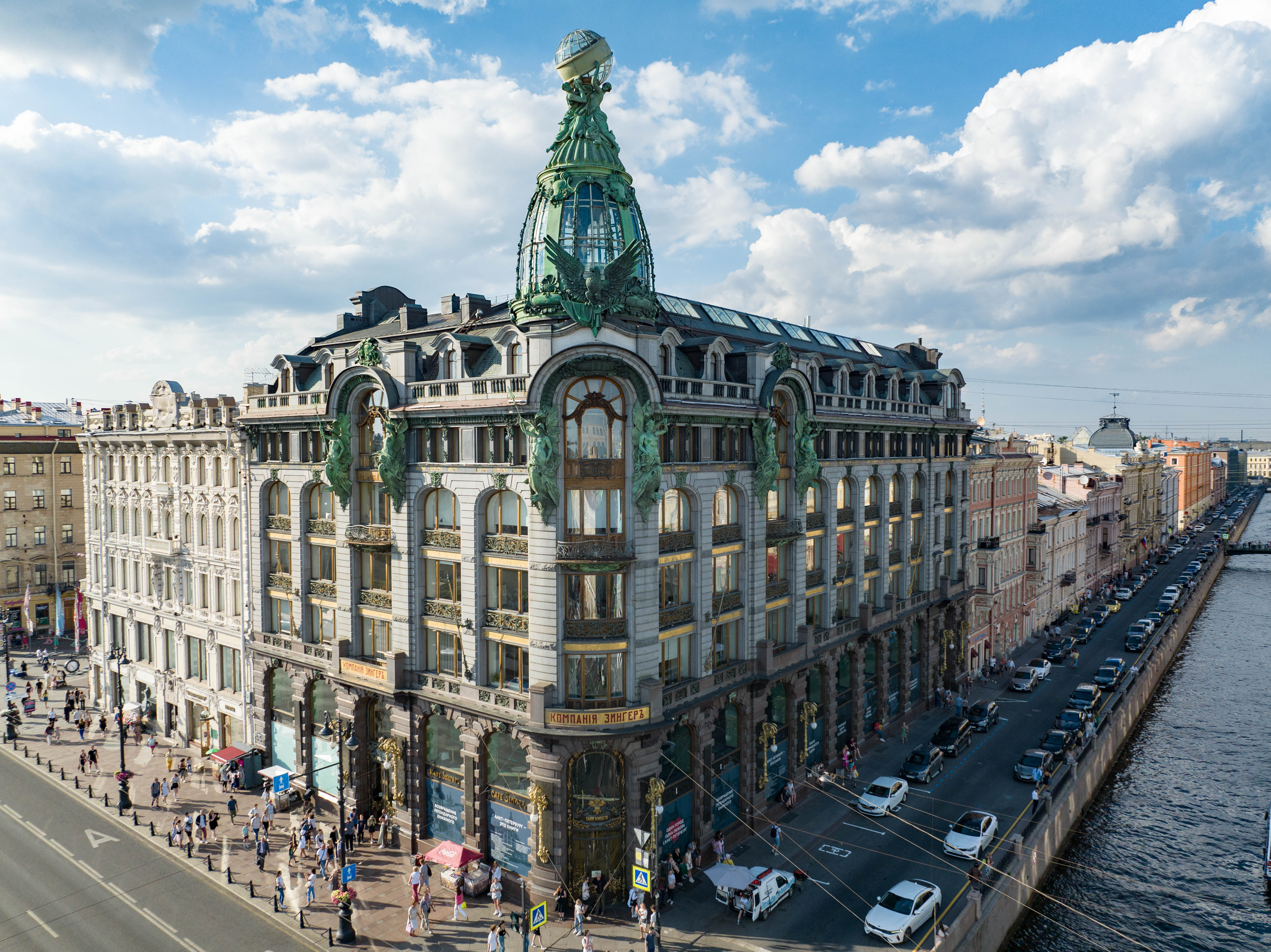
- Singer House in 2022
- Alternative names: House of the Book

General information
- Architectural style: Art Nouveau
- Location: 28 Nevsky Prospekt, Saint Petersburg, Russia
- Coordinates: 59°56′9″N 30°19′32″E
- Completed: 1904

Design and construction
- Architect: Pavel Suzor

Singer House (Russian: Дом компании «Зингер»), also widely known as the House of the Book (Russian: Дом книги), is a historic building in Saint Petersburg, Russia. It is located at the intersection of Nevsky Prospekt and the Griboyedov Canal, directly opposite the Kazan Cathedral. It is recognized as a historical landmark and has official status as an object of Russian cultural heritage.

The building was constructed in 1902–1904 by the leading Petersburg architect of the time, Pavel Suzor, for the Russian headquarters of the Singer Sewing Machine Company. After the Russian Revolution the house was nationalized and since 1919 used for offices of the editors' houses of various magazines and publishers. The main city bookshop was opened in 1938 and stayed operative even during the World War II.

In the early 2000s the building was reconstructed. The Russian social network company VKontakte has rented offices in the building since 2010.

== History ==
=== Location ===
The first land records date back to the 1730s when the Empress Anna Ioannovna ordered that her royal stables be relocated there, which were previously situated next to the Winter Palace. In 1742–1743 a wooden opera house was built there by Francesco Bartolomeo Rastrelli; however, it was destroyed by fire on October 19, 1749. Only in the 1770s was the land occupied again — it was given to Catherine the Great's personal priest Ivan Panfilov, who built himself a three-storey stone mansion. In 1820 it was bought out and rebuilt by Vincent Beretti for pharmacist Karl Imzen. Imzen leased some of the rooms to private arendators; one of them was Sergey Levitsky's daguerreotype studio. In the 1860s the building was reconstructed by Friedrich Adolf Rudolf for new owners the Zhukovsky family. In 1900 the land was bought from the widow Olga Zhukovskaya by the Singer company for a sum exceeding 1 million roubles.

=== Construction ===
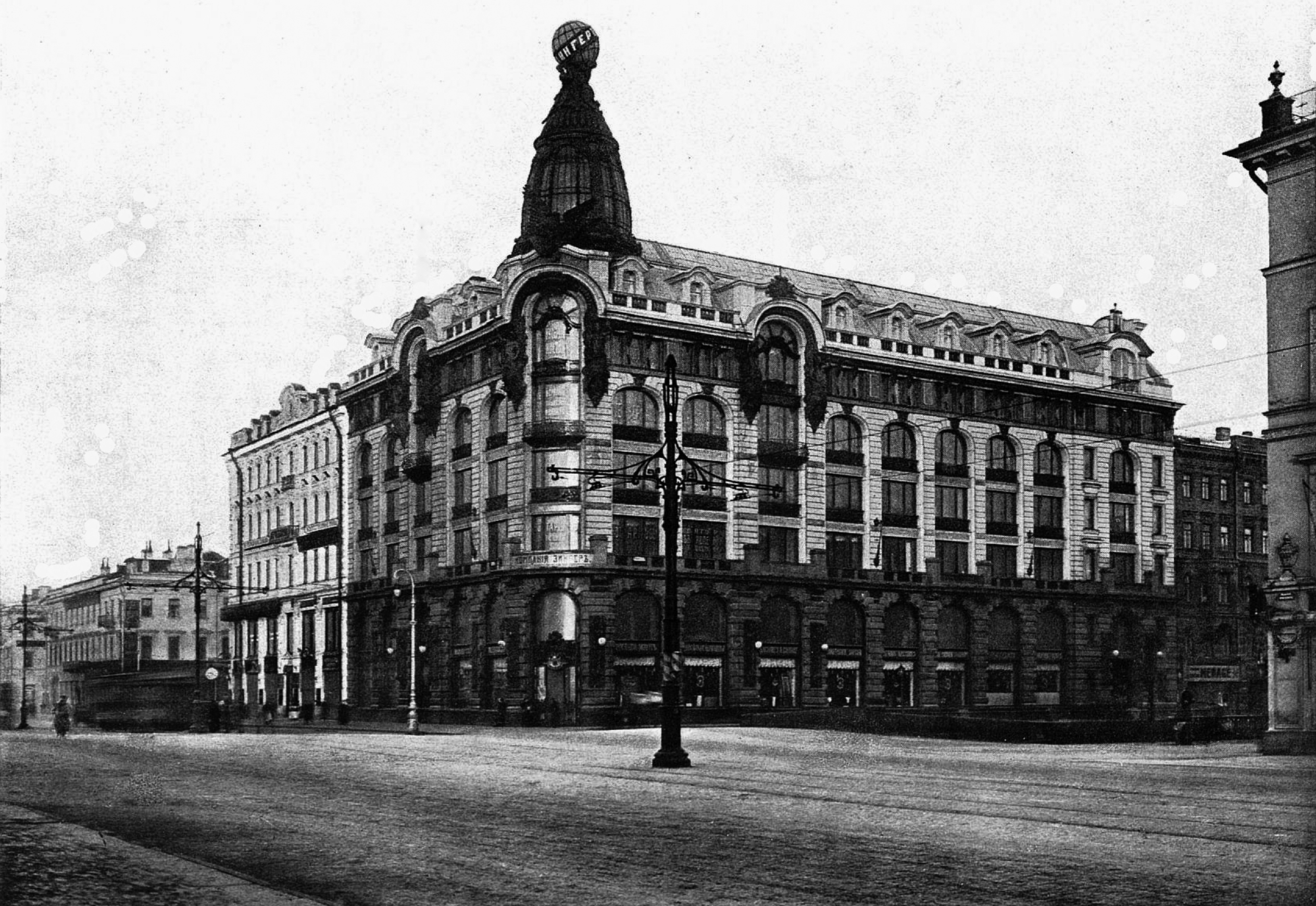
Singer House before 1914

In 1900 the Singer Company bought lands in Podolsk to open its production centre there; it planned to expand its business not only into the Russian market but further to the east: to Turkey, Persia, China, and Japan. The company looked for a presentable headquarters so soon a piece of land on the most active business street in the Russian capital was chosen and bought for an enormous sum of money, more than 1 million roubles. To design and construct the building the company invited the most prominent Russian architect of that time – Pavel Suzor.

The management of the Singer Company initially intended to construct a skyscraper, similar to the Ernest Flagg Singer Building, the company headquarters under construction at that time in New York City, but the Saint Petersburg building code did not allow structures taller than the Winter Palace. Suzor found an elegant solution to the 23.5-metre (77 ft) height limit: the six-story Art Nouveau building, crowned with a glass tower, which in turn is topped by a glass globe sculpture created by Estonian artist Amandus Adamson. Suzor designed three general projects of the building and the discussion lasted for more than a year; only in 1901 was one of them approved by the client.

During the dismantling of the old house it was found that its first store was below the pebbling level. To fully make use of the land, Suzor projected a two-winged six-storey house with two atriums covered by a glass ceiling. Due to the metal frame with brick layers and cement casting, the construction was strong enough to make the outer walls nonstructural and cut two-storey windows.

The facades were lined with polished pink and gray granite. Sculptors Alexander Ober and A. G. Adamson created bronze decor. Adamson also designed the valkyries on the front side. The dominant figure of the composition is the tower with a dome and a glass globe. The globe was belted with a golden ribbon with the Singer name. A bronze eagle with wide-spread wings was placed right under the globe. The dome was designed to support the existing composition of the neighborhood including Saint Petersburg City Duma and the Church of the Savior on Blood.

The building was equipped with advanced engineering systems and communications of its time, designed by Franz San Galli. Apart from heating, ventilation, plumbing, and water supply, he created a specialized system to melt the ice on the roof in cold seasons. The interiors are luxurious, designed in Art Nouveau style and richly decorated with Carrara marble, mahogany, gilding, mosaics, and stained glass windows.

The construction was completed in 1904. The Singer headquarters occupied the top store; the main hall with columns was used as its showroom. Other space was leased to commercial companies, bank offices, etc. Historians call the Singer House 'the first office center in St Petersburg'. For a brief period of time in 1917–1918 a US Embassy was located on the first floor.

Peers criticized the Singer House and called it vulgar. The prominent Russian architect Alexander Benois compared its dome to a bottle of perfume, and another architect, Lev Ilyin, considered the building a bad neighbor for the Kazan Cathedral. Even Suzor's former student Gavriil Baranovsky criticized the house as a dull and unremarkable creation.

=== 20th century ===
In 1919, not long after the October Revolution, the building was given to the Petrograd State Publishing House. It quickly became the city's largest bookstore, and was subsequently named "The House of Books" in 1938. The bookstore remained functioning during the Siege of Leningrad and was closed only for several months. When in 1941 a bomb hit the next house, the blast wave broke windows in the Singer House. Even then, the shop remained open after the staff boarded up the windows. In the 1920s the eagle sculpture disappeared.

After World War II the Singer House became the center of literary life in St Petersburg. At different times it hosted prominent book publishers: Molodaya Gvardiya, Mir Publishers, Khudozhestvennaya Literatura, Prosveschenie, Iskusstvo, Izogiz, Kolos Publishers, Sovetsky Pisatel, and many editorial offices for magazines and newspapers. From 1920 to the late 1950s the third floor was occupied by the state censorship committee.

In 1999 all companies were moved out and the building was rented to Andrei Isaev's St Petersburg Real Estate Agency for 49 years.

=== Reconstruction ===
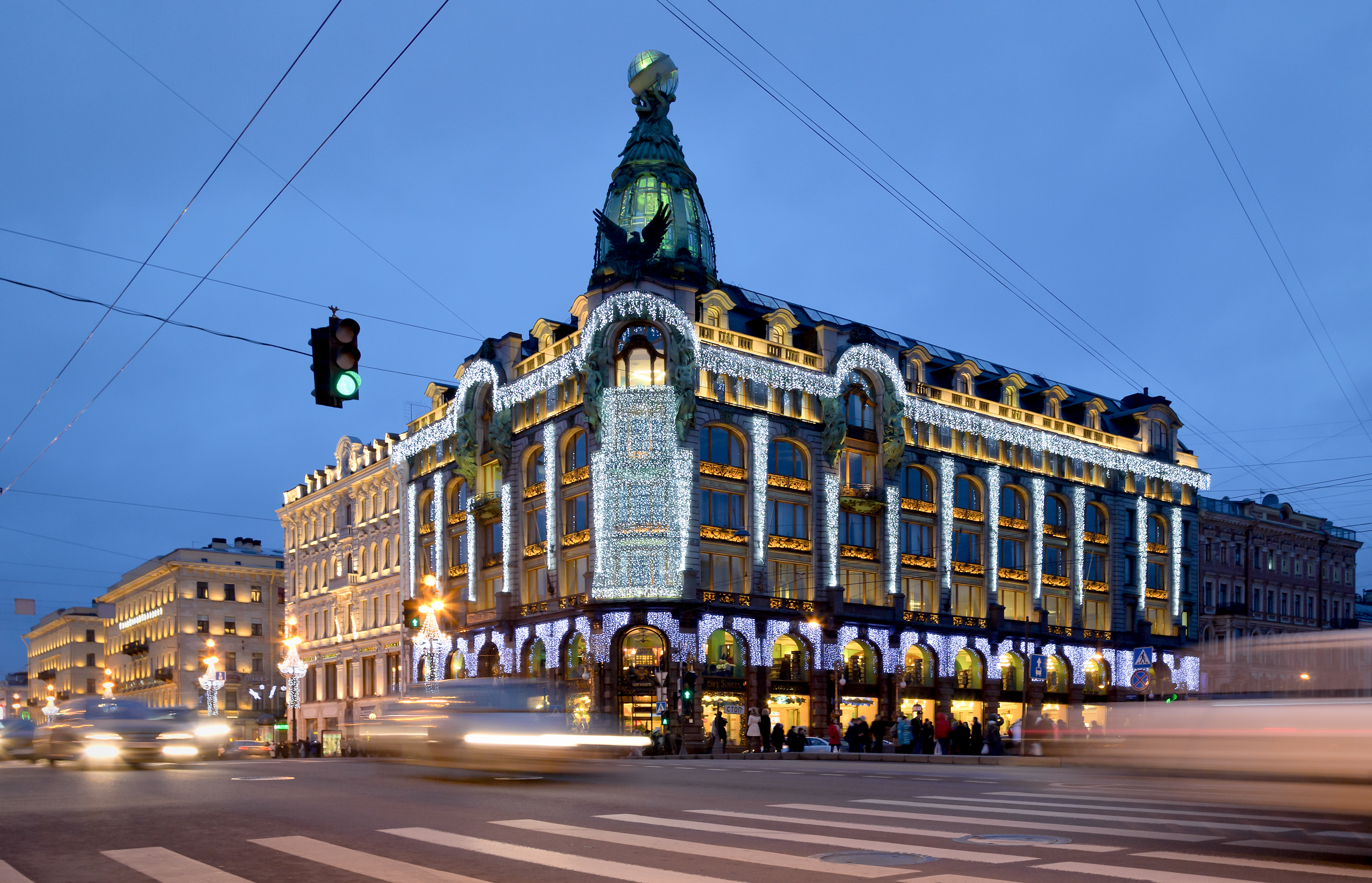
Christmas façade illumination

For almost a hundred years no restoration was done to the building. When it was rented to Isaev, the contract included an encumbrance of a complete restoration made in accordance with the Committee for State Control, Use and Protection of Historical and Cultural Monuments. The historical and cultural examination alone took three years. The experts discovered that all metal parts of the construction were heavily corroded and required replacement. They also revealed a construction mistake that misplaced structural loading and caused deformation of the non-structural walls and floors. In Soviet times the remodelling caused further deformations, and as a result, the floor visibly began to sag. The technical wear on the engineering systems reached 70%. Until then, two apartments were still inhabited; the last families were relocated only in the early 2000s.

During the reconstruction, all structural elements of the building were changed to reinforced concrete, and the foundation was strengthened with 2500 new piles and multiple layers of waterproofing. In 2003 the bronze decor and the facade sculptures were restored. Based on historical images, the interiors were reconstructed with the original design, including floor mosaics, marble stairs and Venetian stucco on the walls. Sculptor A. A. Arkhipov recreated the eagle statue under the glass globe. According to the reports, the restoration of the Singer House cost more than 1 billion roubles. The ground floor was opened in 2006 and the remainder in 2009.

In 2010 Vkontakte rented the seventh floor of the building.

== Gallery ==
Singer House

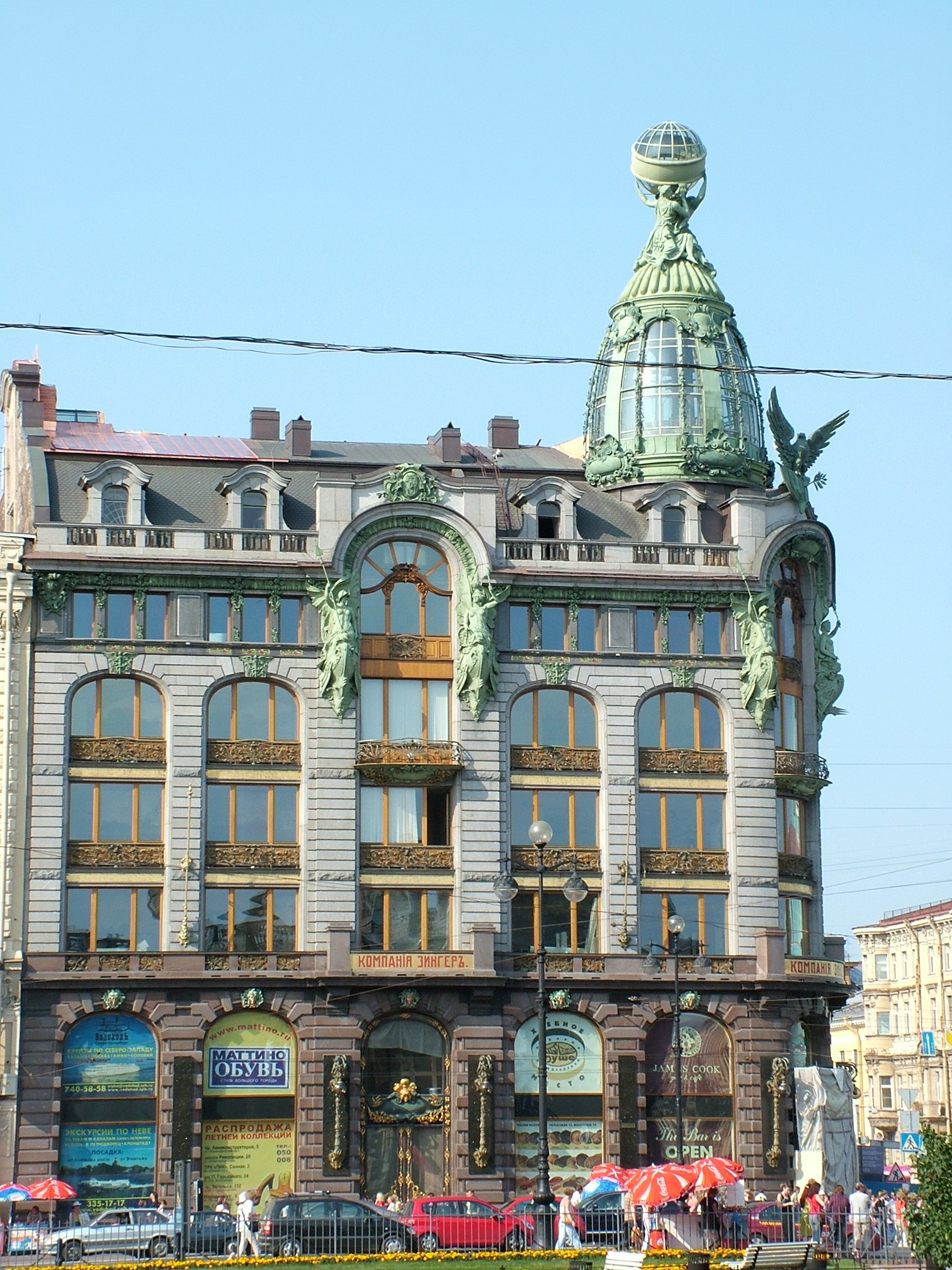
Side view, 2006

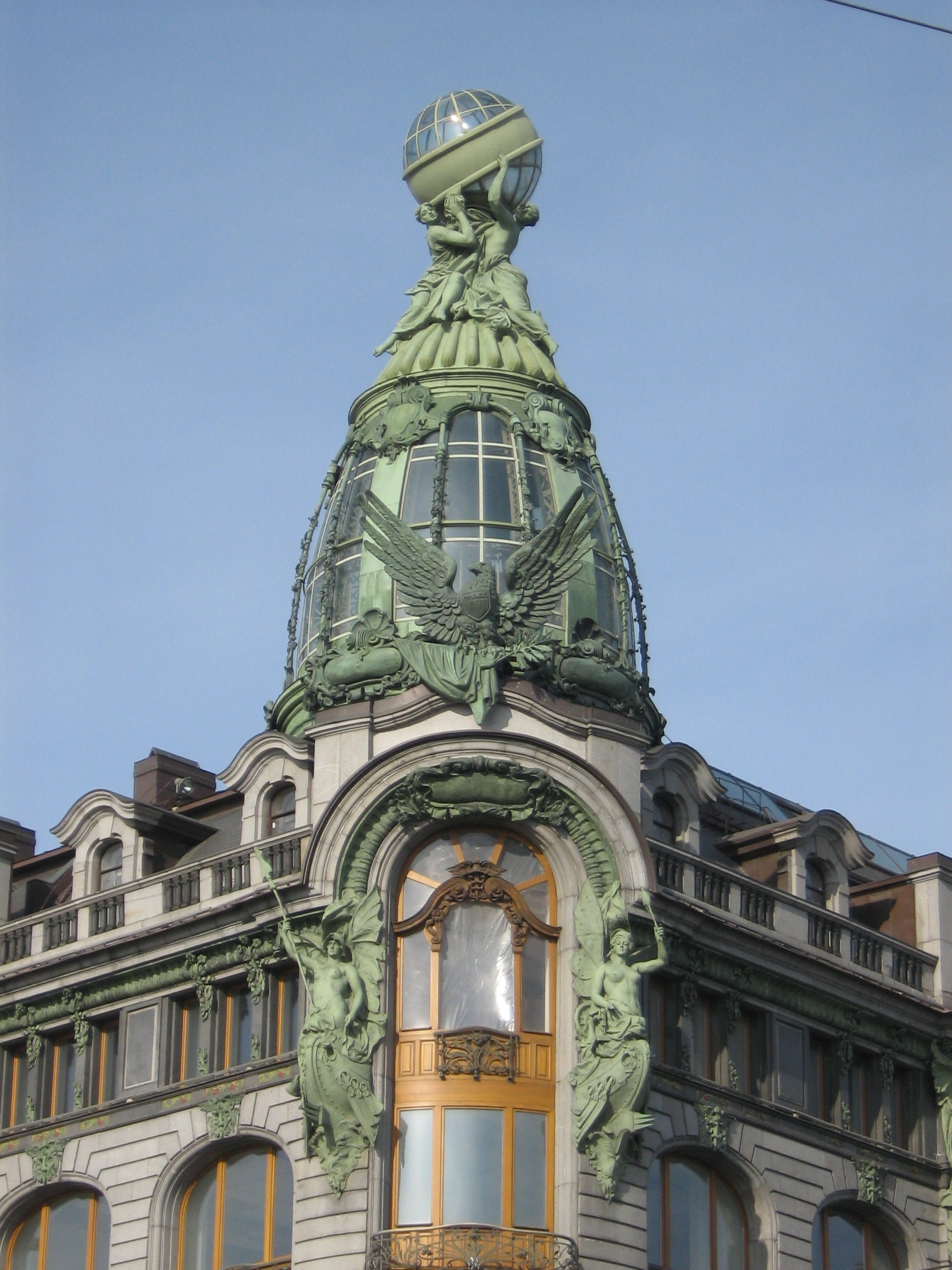
The tower with the globe on the top, 2008

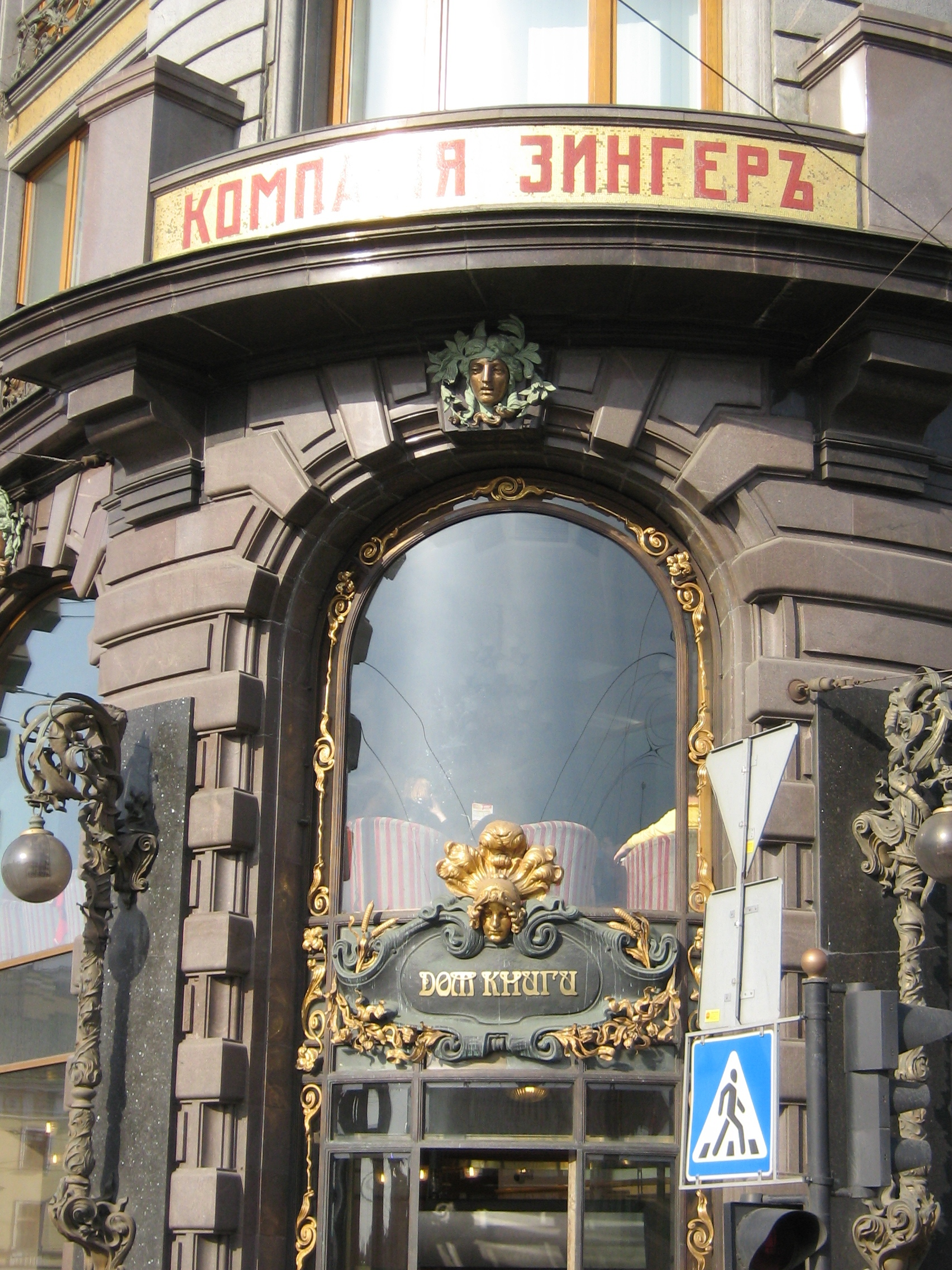
Entrance, 2008

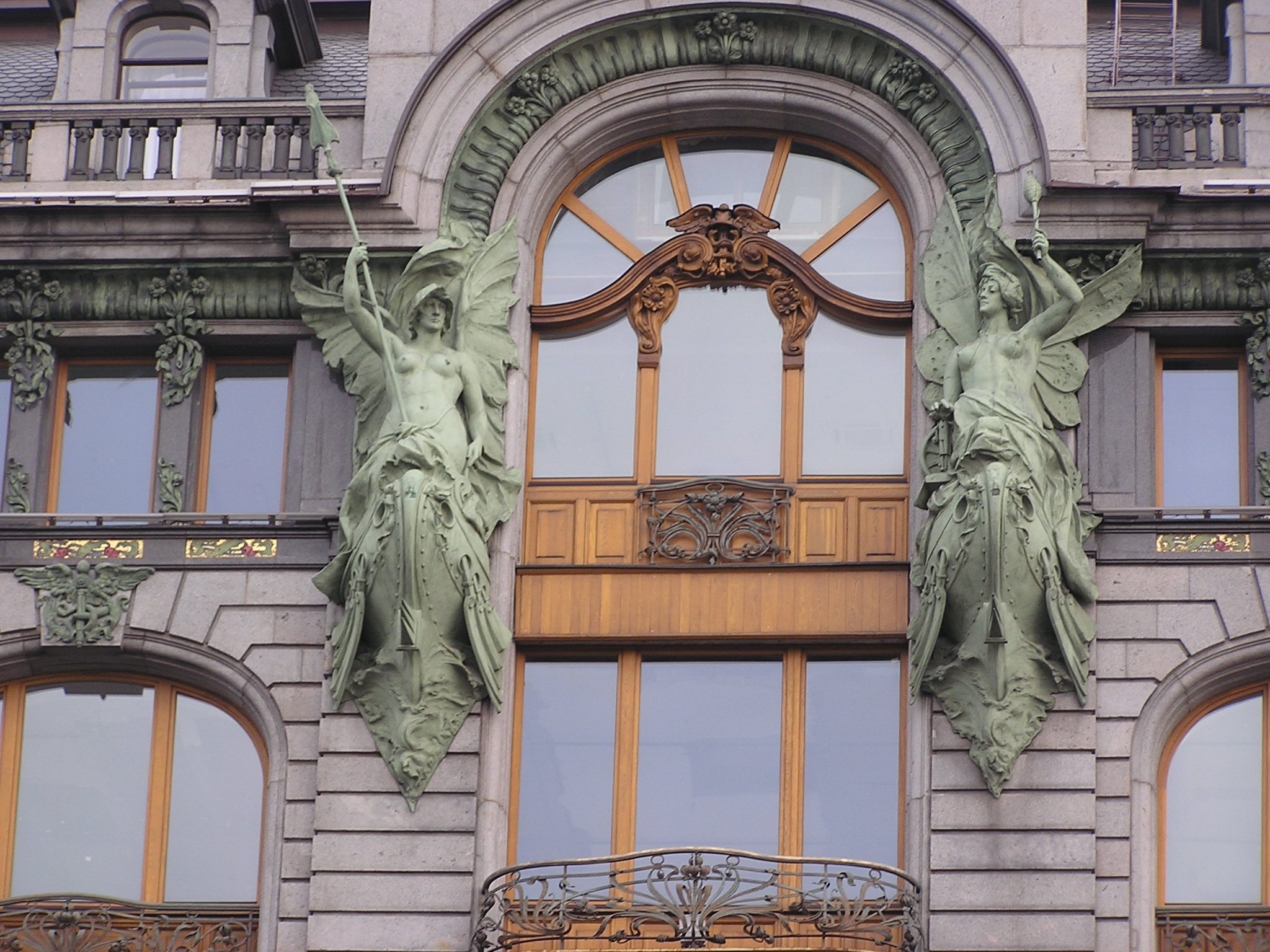
Valkyries on the tower, 2008

== Sources ==
- Gusarov, A. (2018). Исторические здания Петербурга. Прошлое и современность. Адреса и обитатели [Historical Buildings of St Petersburg. Past and Modern Times. Addresses and Inhabitants]. Centrepolygraph Publishing House. ISBN 978-5-227-08042-4.
- Isachenko, V. G. (2010). Зодчие Санкт-Петербурга XVIII – XX веков [Architects of St. Petersburg of the 18th – 20th centuries] (in Russian). Centerpoligraf. ISBN 978-5-227-02220-2.
- Kirikov, B. M. (2003). Архитектурные памятники Санкт-Петербурга: стили и мастера [Architectural monuments of St. Petersburg: styles and masters] (in Russian). St. Petersburg: White and Black [Белое и Чёрное]. ISBN 5-89771-032-5.
- Kirikov, B. M.; Petrova, O. V.; Kirikova, L. A. (2013). Невский проспект. Дом за домом [Nevsky Prospekt. House by House] (in Russian). Centrepolygraph Publishing House. ISBN 978-5-9524-2069-4.
- Volobuev, O. V.; Kudriavtsev, I. I. (1992). Making Things Work: Russian and American Economic Relations, 1900–1930. Hoover Institution Press. p. 51-53. ISBN 0-8179-9242-1.
- Potkina, I. V. (2015). Архитектор и заказчик: к истории строительства здания «Компании Зингер» в Петербурге [Architect and Client: History of the Singer House in St Petersburg]. Historical Journal: Scientific Research (in Russian). 1 (25): 88–98. doi:10.7256/2222-1972.2015.1.15619.
- Lurye, L. Ya. (2020). The doomed city. A guide through the city before revolution. BHV. ISBN 978-5-9775-3656-1.
- Chesnokova, A. N. (2003). Иностранцы и их потомки в Петербурге: немцы, французы, британцы : 1703-1917 : историко-краеведческие очерки [Expats and their offspring in St Petersburg: Germans, French, British: 1703-1917] (in Russian). Statis. ISBN 9785943830051.
- Рубашкин А. И. (2003). В Доме Зингера и вокруг него (in Russian). Logos. p. 568. ISBN 5-87288-255-6.
- Вознесенский А. (2008). Дом компании "Зингер" - Дом Книги (in Russian). Коло. p. 44.
