= Pavel Suzor =

Russian architect (1844–1919)

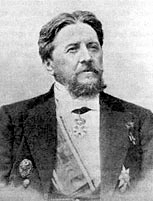
Pavel Suzor

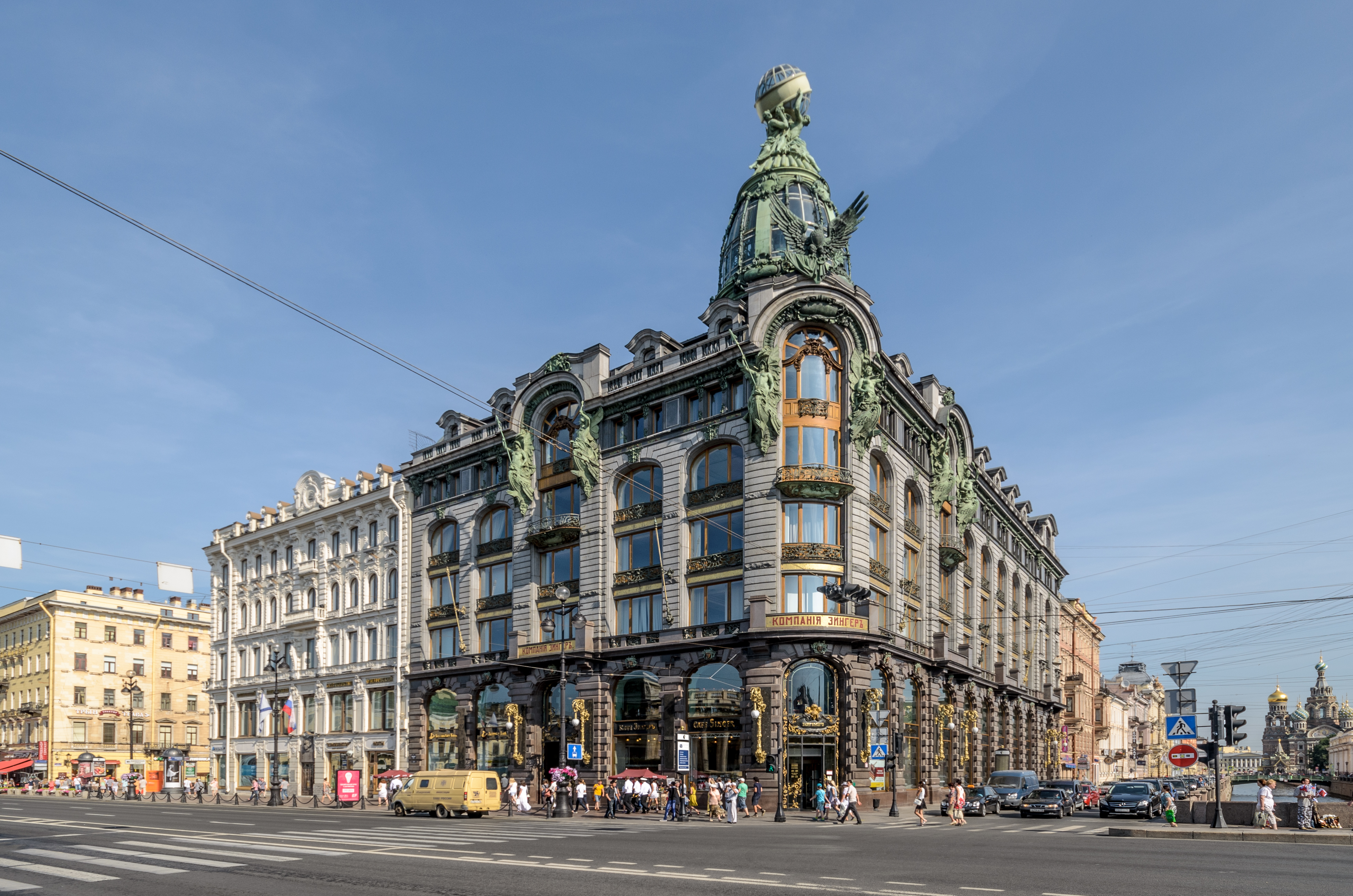
Singer House in Saint Petersburg was designed by Pavel Suzor from 1902 to 1904

Count Pavel Yulievich Suzor (Russian: Павел Юльевич Сюзор; French: Paul-Jules Persin comte Suzor; 1844–1919) was a Russian architect, president of the Architects Society, and count.

== Biography ==
Count Paul-Jules de Persin-Suzor was born in Saint Petersburg, Russian Empire, to a French political immigrant and nobleman, Count Jean Baptiste Jules de Persin-Suzor (1801-1889) and Marie Laurence Stéphanie de Livio. His great-grandfather, a French nobleman Jean Baptiste Persin Dubois, married Countess Elizabeth de Suzur and received the comital title through that marriage.

Suzor graduated from the Saint Petersburg Imperial Academy of Arts in 1866. He started to work for the city council in 1873, and in 1883 he started to teach at the Saint Petersburg Institute of Civil Engineering. Suzor practiced Eclecticism and Art Nouveau in his designs. In 1903 Suzor became chairman and president of the Architects Society. In 1907 he cofounded the Museum of Old Saint Petersburg at his own house.

== Works ==
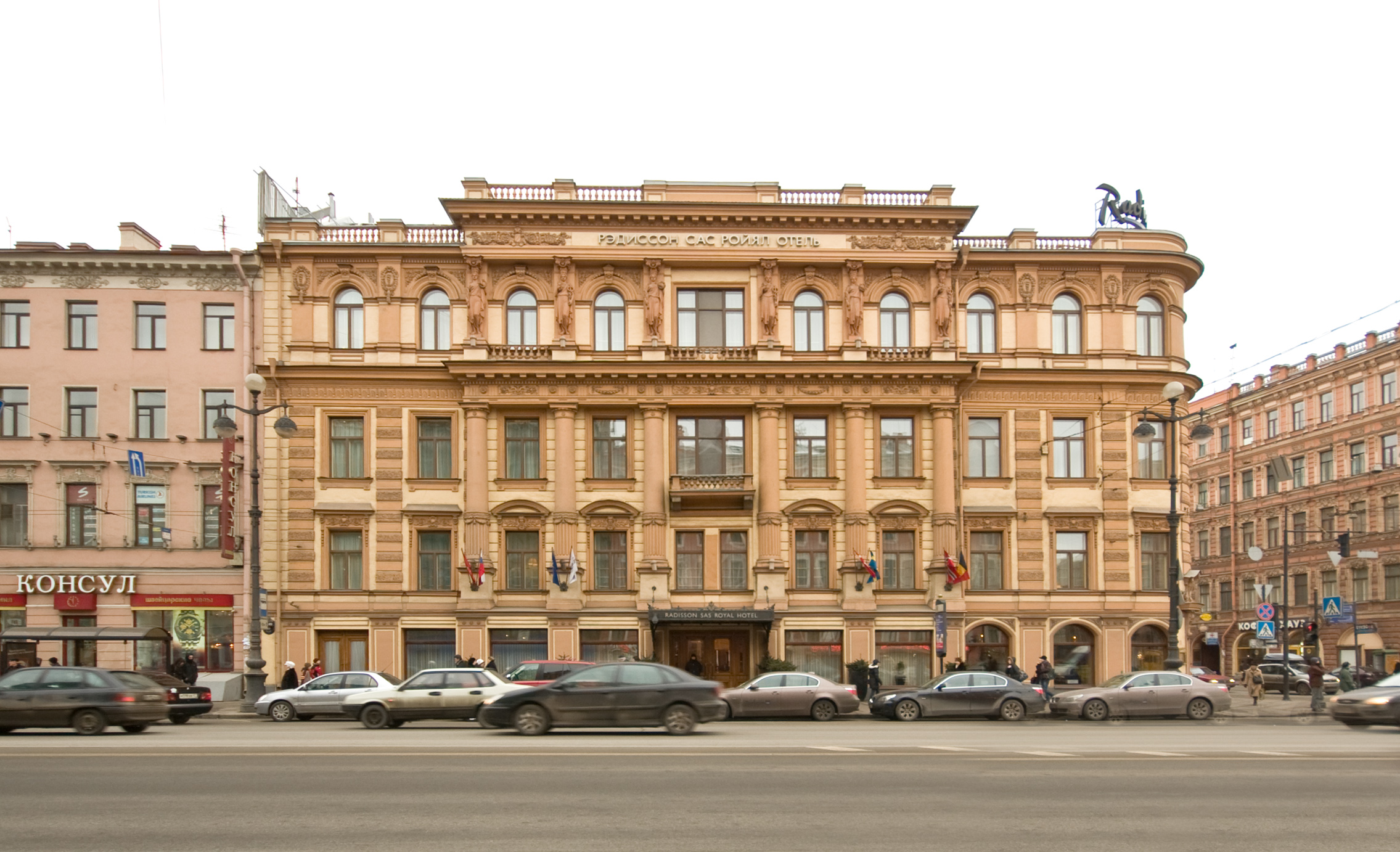
Ushakov House by Pavel Suzor (1882-1883)

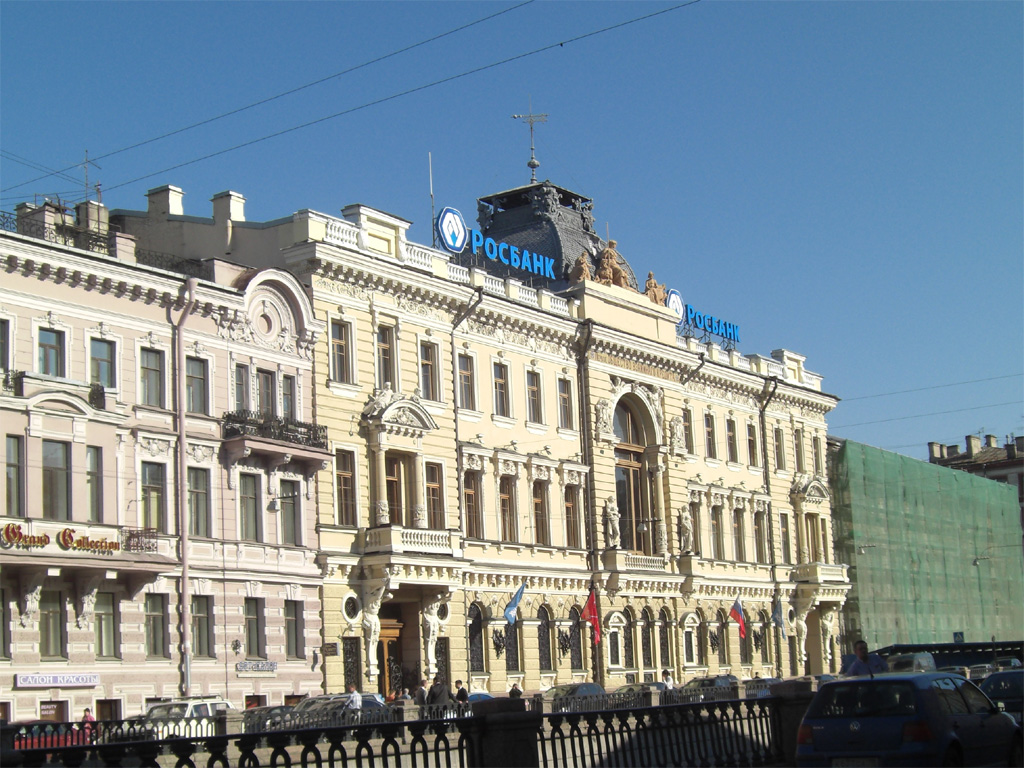
First Mutual Credit Society House (1888-1890)

There are over 80 buildings designed by Pavel Suzor in Saint Petersburg.

=== Apartment houses ===
- Nevsky 63 - Nevsky Prospekt 63 (1872)
- Ushakov House - Nevsky Prospekt 49 (1882-1883)
- Egorov House - Nekrasov Street 40 (1883-1884)
- Ratkov-Rozhnov House - Griboedov Canal Embankment 71 (1886-1888)
- Badaev House - Bolshoy Avenue 49 (1902-1903)

=== Baths ===
Suzor paid special attention to baths

- Voronin baths - Fonarny Lane 1 (1870-1871)
- Egorov baths - Bolshoy Kazachy Lane 11 (1875-1876)
- Ovchinnikov baths - Bolshaya Pushkarskaya Street 22 (1876-1877)
- Belozerskie baths - Kropotkina Street 1 (1882)

=== Banks and corporations buildings ===
- First Mutual Credit Society House - 13 Griboedov Canal Embankment (1888-1890)
- Singer House - Nevsky Prospekt 28 (1902-1904)

== Family ==
Pavel Suzor was married to the daughter of Alexander Brullov, Sofia. They had two sons: Vladimir and Georgy.
