= Saint Petersburg City Duma =

City hall

Coordinates: 59°56′5″N 30°19′46″E

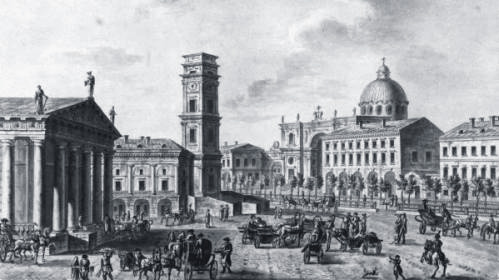
Nevsky Prospekt near the City Duma in 1811.

Saint Petersburg City Duma was established in 1785 in the course of Catherine the Great's municipal reform. Emperor Paul replaced it by the so-called Ratusha, but his son, Alexander I, had the Duma restored four years later. The next emperor, Nicholas I, expanded the institution from six to twelve members in 1846. Alexander II of Russia reorganized it once again during the Zemstvo reform of the 1870s. In September 1918 the Duma was abolished and its functions devolved on the Petrograd Soviet.

The Neoclassical headquarters of the Duma were erected on the main city avenue, Nevsky Prospekt, between 1784 and 1787. The famous Italianate tower was added in 1799–1804 to a design by Giacomo Ferrari. In 1847–52, the edifice was rebuilt in the Neo-Renaissance style, favoured by Nicholas I. Two more floors were added to the building in 1913–14. A spacious central hall of the City Duma was frequently let to host high-profile social events.

The structure is located at the corner of the avenue and Dumskaya Street, opposite the Merchant Court and Grand Hotel Europe. Its distinctive tower, formerly used for fire observation, can still be seen the whole length of Nevsky Prospekt after the crossing with Fontanka River.

During the Soviet years, the Smolny Institute effectively functioned as the Saint Petersburg City Hall. After the dissolution of the Soviet Union, the Legislative Assembly made the Mariinsky Palace its headquarters.
