= Monument to Alexander II (Moscow) =

Russian monument

Coordinates: 55.7456°N 37.6067°E

The Monument to Alexander II, officially called the Monument to Emperor Alexander II, the Liberator Tsar, is a memorial of Emperor Alexander II of Russia, situated in the immediate surroundings of the Cathedral of Christ the Saviour in Moscow. Completed in 2005 and partly inspired by a destroyed imperial monument from 1898, the statue itself was paid for by private donations, with the rest of the monument mainly financed by public funding. The site for the new monument was chosen in part because Alexander helped lay the foundation for the original Christ the Savior Cathedral (destroyed in 1931 by Soviet leader Joseph Stalin) and ruled during its construction.

== History ==
=== The 1898 memorial ===
The first monument to Alexander II stood above the Kremlin's Taynitsky Gardens and could easily be seen from the Zamoskvorechye district across the Moscow River. Work on the monuments was begun under emperor Alexander III in 1893, and was completed five years later under emperor Nicholas II in 1898. The monument was the work of sculptor Alexander Opekushin, artist Peter Zhukovsky and architect Nicholas V. Sultanov. The memorial consisted of a life-size bronze sculpture of Alexander II, set on a square pedestal with the words "To Emperor Alexander II by the love of the people" engraved on it. The sculpture was shaded by a canopy of polished dark red Carelian granite. The top of the canopy was made of specially fitted gilded bronze sheets with green enamel. On three sides - the exception being the side facing the Chudov Monastery, Ascension Convent and the Maly Nikolayevsky Palace (all of which were demolished for the enlargement of the Ivanovskaya Square in the 1930s), the monument was surrounded by a gallery with arches and openwork. Thirty-three mosaic portraits of Russia's rulers from Prince Vladimir to emperor Nicholas II based on sketches by artist Peter Zhukovsky were placed in the gallery's vaults. It was demolished in the summer of 1918 during the Bolshevik revolution, while the columns and gallery stood forlornly overlooking the high bank of the Moskva River until the end of the 1920s.

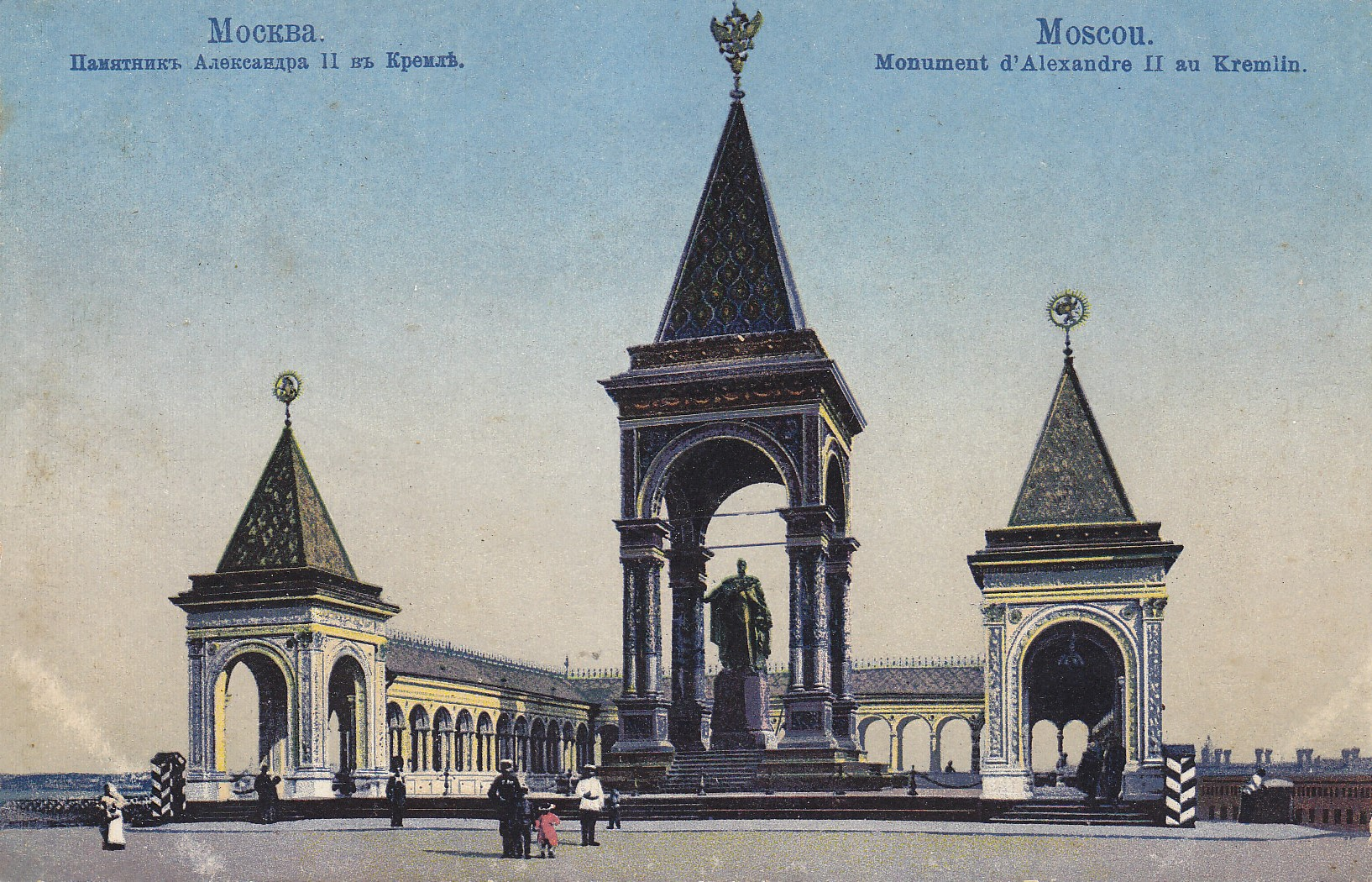
Postcard of the old monument to Alexander II, as seen from Ivanovskaya Square.

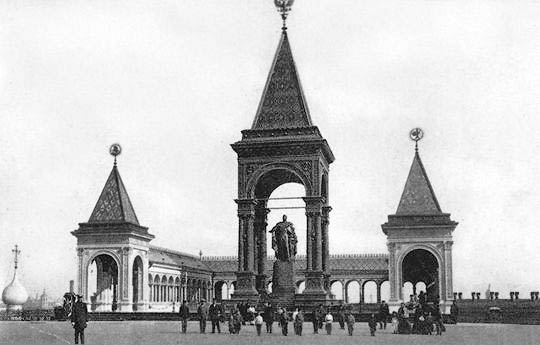
Photo of same.

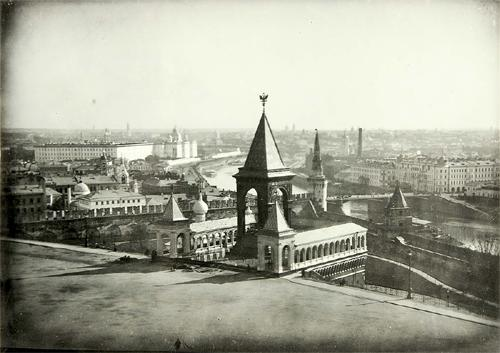
Old monument

=== The 2005 memorial ===
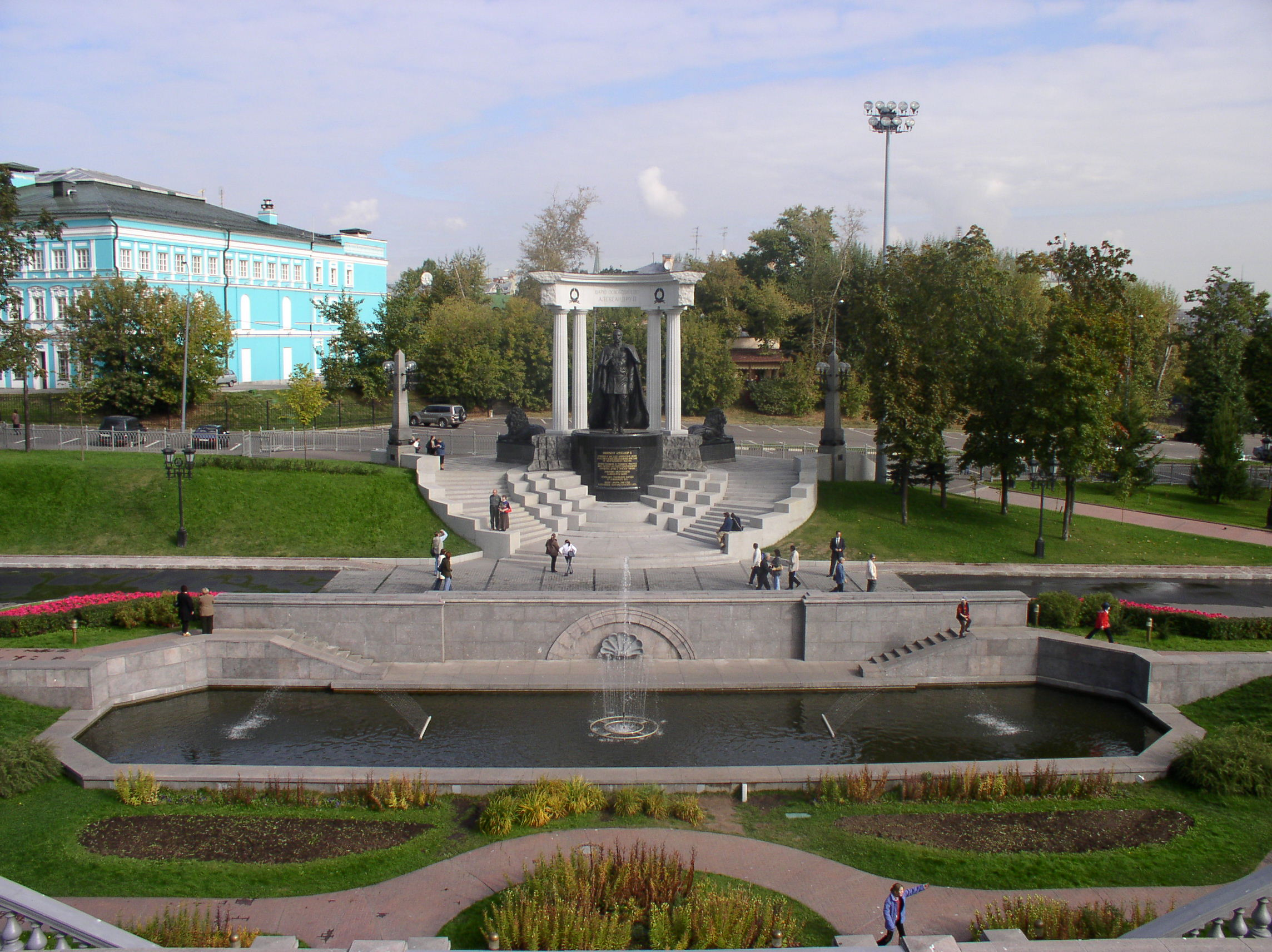
New monument

On June 2, 2004, Moscow Mayor Yuri Luzhkov signed a decree about the erection of a new monument to the emperor Alexander II in Moscow. The monument envisages the full height figure of the Emperor — 5 meters high and standing on a 5-meter pedestal. The new monument is located in a slope, made use of it in such a way that, from one side, the emperor is elevated on a pedestal and, from the other side, it seems that the emperor is standing right on the ground, portraying a man who is just standing and looking into the distance, facing the cathedral. The memorial was designed by professor Alexander Rukavishnikov, a member of the Russian Academy of Arts. At first, the monument was supposed to be set by the Kremlin's Kutafya Tower; however, a new place was found for it around Christ the Savior Cathedral. The Moscow Government reserved 60 million rubles for financing works on design, making of the granite pedestal, setting of the monument and finishing of the surrounding territory. On June 7, 2005 Alexius II, Patriarch of Moscow and all Russia, performed the consecration of the new monument.

Alexander II is probably best known for his 1861 order to end serfdom, and an inscription on the monument listing his accomplishments says he "freed millions of peasants from centuries of slavery". The inscription on the memorial mentions Alexander's military, judicial and administrative reforms, changes aimed at establishing a more Western-style system based on elements such as the rule of law and individual rights. It claims that he ended the war in the Caucasus. The monument also references Alexander freeing Slavs from "the Ottoman yoke", based on the Balkan war against Turkey in the 1870s, during which Russia freed Bulgaria from the Ottoman Empire's hegemony.

== Sources ==
- Kirychenko, Yevgeniya Ivanovna (1977). Moscow architectural monuments of the 1830–1910s. Moscow.
- Monument to Alexander II to be Erected in Moscow, in the Kommersant, June 2, 2004.
- Dmitrieva, Marina (July 2006). "Moscow Architecture between Stalinism and Modernism". International Review of Sociology. 16 (2): 427–450. doi:10.1080/03906700600709350. S2CID 145440120.
