= Kremlin Presidium =

Former building in Moscow, Russia

- Административный корпус Кремля №14
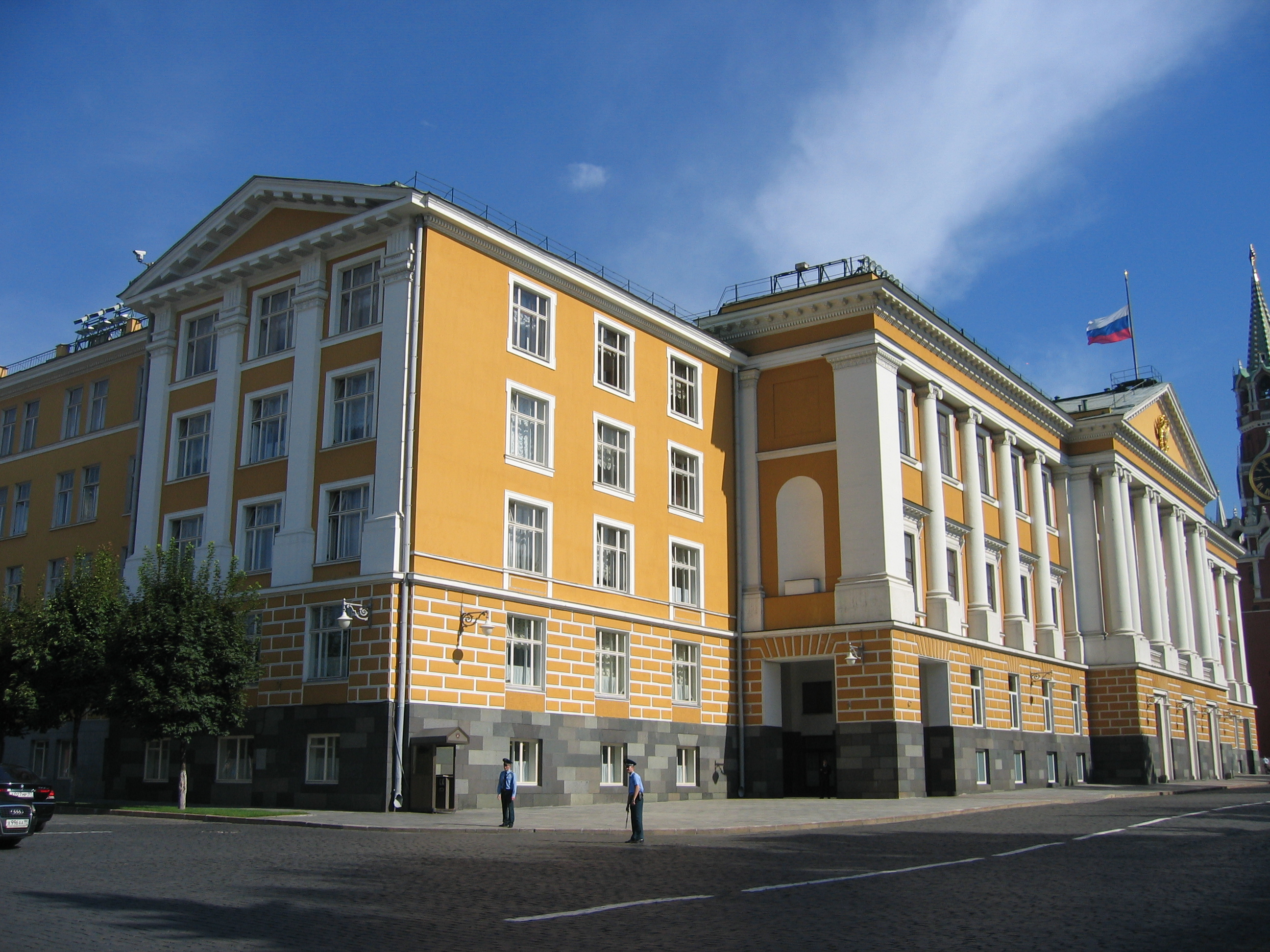
- Interactive map of the Kremlin Presidium area
- Alternative names: Building 14

General information
- Architectural style: Neoclassical
- Coordinates: 55°45′8.05″N 37°37′12.61″E
- Construction started: 1932
- Completed: 1934
- Demolished: 2016

Design and construction
- Architect: Ivan Rerberg

The Kremlin Presidium (The Administrative Building of the Kremlin, Russian: Административный корпус Кремля, romanized: Administrativnyy korpus Kremlya), also denominated Building 14 (Russian: 14-й корпус), was an edifice within the Moscow Kremlin in Russia. Constructed on the site of the demolished historic cathedrals in 1934, until 2011 it housed, first, the Supreme Soviet, i.e. the supreme legislative body of the Soviet Union until its dissolution in 1991, and, second, the offices of the Presidential Administration of Russia. It was dismantled in 2016.

== Building ==
The Kremlin Presidium was located in the northern part of the Kremlin, adjacent to the Kremlin Senate and forming one side of Ivanovskaya Square. The edifice of four storeys had three wings opening toward the Senate, which a central building which faced Taynitskaya Garden to the south connected. The southern facade had an Ionic colonnade and a gabled roof in the center, reflecting the Neoclassical style of the adjacent Senate Building. However, the halls of the wings were much simpler and less conspicuous. The building had three floors and was painted in the same yellow color as many of the other administrative buildings in the Moscow Kremlin.

== History ==
The Presidium was on the site of the former Chudov Monastery which Metropolitan Alexius of Moscow founded in 1365, Ascension Convent, and Lesser Nicholas Palace. These were among the historic edifices in the Kremlin that Joseph Stalin ordered demolished as part of the state atheism campaign, pursuant to which religious structures throughout Russia were razed. Ivan Rerberg, a prominent architect of Moscow who had designed the Kiyevsky Rail Terminal, was assigned to design a new administrative building for the Soviet government, and its construction began almost immediately.

The new edifice was completed in 1934, two years after Rerberg's death. Initially it was not named, and it hosted the Red Commanders School, which was a military academy for Red Army leaders. The School was relocated in 1935, and from 1938 the building housed the offices of the Presidium of the Supreme Soviet, whose head was the de jure head of state of the Soviet Union.

From 1958-61, part of the building was converted into the 1,200-seat Kremlin Theatre (Кремлёвский театр). However, it proved to be an awkward venue, and its functions were transferred to the newly built State Kremlin Palace.

== Demolition ==
In 2001 the Presidium was slated for repair. After the relocation of the Presidential Administration to the Staraya Ploschad in 2011, important renovations began that were originally planned to be completed by 2015. Despite several years of renovation work, which was criticized as an imprudent expenditure of public funds, alternative proposals were made. It was decided to discontinue the renovation and demolish the building entirely.

In 2014 President Vladimir Putin proposed the restoration of the former Chudov Monastery, Ascension Convent, and Small Nicholas Palace. This proposal, if approved, would radically change the plan of the Kremlin and restore the historical vista of Ivanovskaya Square. At the same time experts doubt the possibility of such an authentic reconstruction.

Meanwhile a plan to build a new park on the site was announced. In April 2016 the Presidium was demolished. A little earlier the closed public entrance through Spasskaya Tower was opened to allow direct passage between Red Square and Alexander Garden; it was previously closed to the public after the Bolshevik Government relocated there in 1918.
