= Ivan Rerberg =

Russian civil engineer, architect and educator

Ivan Ivanovich Rerberg
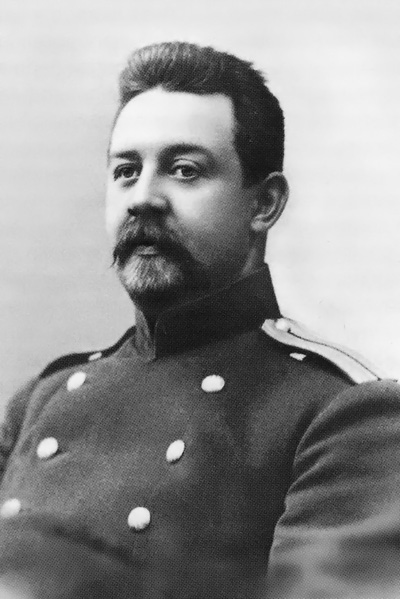
- Born: 4 October 1869; Moscow
- Died: October 15, 1932 (aged 63); Moscow
- Resting place: Vvedenskoye Cemetery, Moscow
- Occupation: Architect
- Practice: Roman Klein firm (1897–1909); Own practice
- Buildings: Central Telegraph and Kiyevsky Rail Terminal (Moscow)

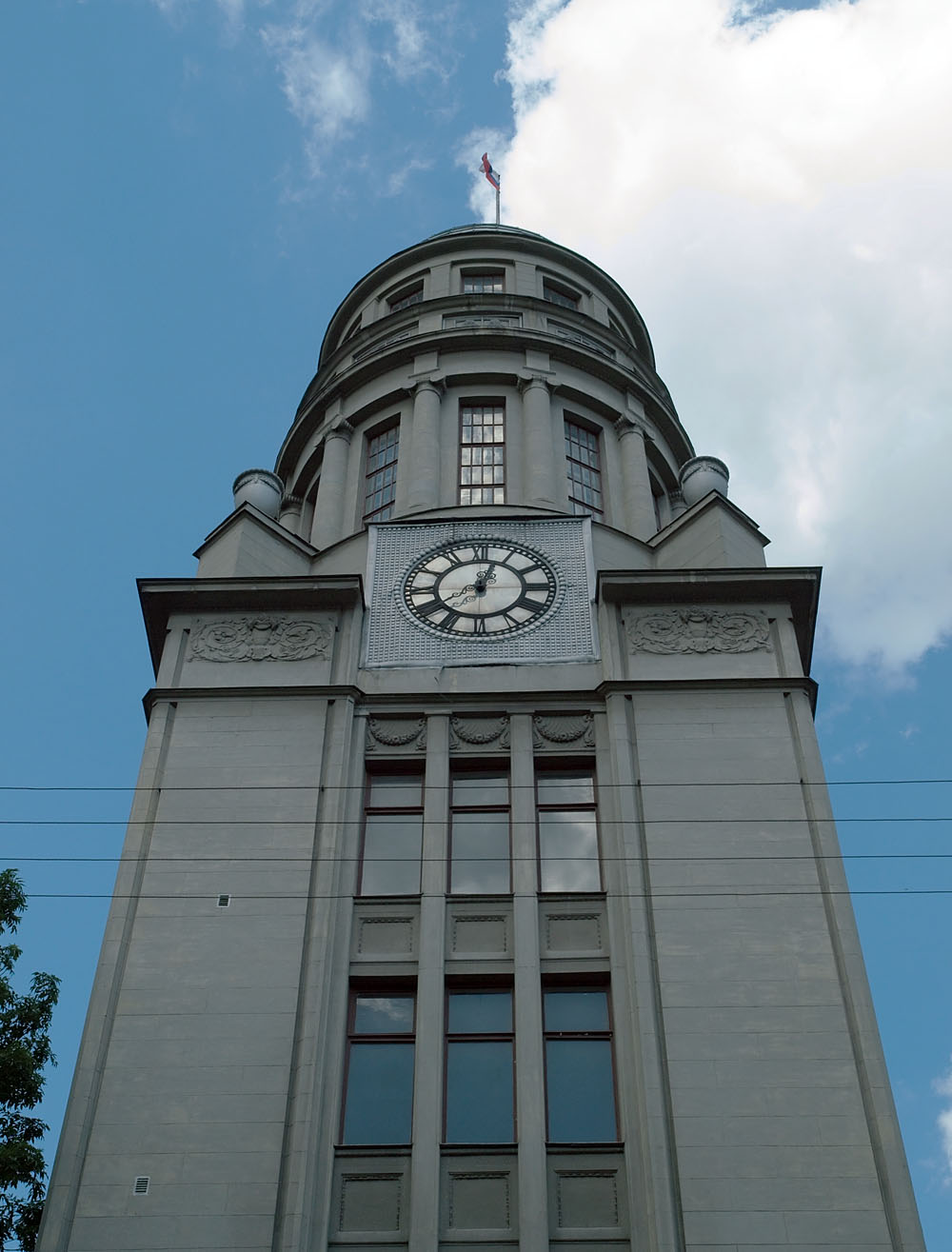
Northern Insurance clock tower, 1909–1912

Ivan Ivanovich Rerberg (October 4, 1869 – October 15, 1932) was a Russian civil engineer, architect and educator active in Moscow in 1897–1932. Rerberg's input to present-day Moscow include Kiyevsky Rail Terminal, Central Telegraph building and the Administration building of Moscow Kremlin. Rerberg, a fourth member in a dynasty of engineers, was credited with innovative approach to structural frames and despised the title of an architect, always signing his drafts Engineer Rerberg.

== Biography ==
Rerberg's father, Ivan Fyodorovich Rerberg (1831—1917), was a railroad engineer who became executive director of Moscow-Nizhny Novgorod railroad. Founder of Rerberg dynasty came to Russia from Denmark in Petrine period, and since then first-born sons in the family always were named either Ivan or Fyodor. Ivan's elder brother, Fyodor (1863—1938), became a painter.

Ivan was educated in a Cadet Corps, was commissioned into military engineers, and graduated from Saint Petersburg Academy of military engineers in 1896. By this time he had solid practical experience in building dams and roads. In the same year he dropped out of military service and joined the construction team of Kharkov locomotive works. In 1887, Rerberg was hired by Roman Klein as Klein's deputy for structural engineering on the site of Museum of Fine Arts in Moscow. Rerberg worked on the museum site for 12 years (1897—1909) and was awarded an honorary title of its lifetime architect. Simultaneously Rerberg managed other projects of Klein's firm — Muir & Mirrielees department store (1907—1908), Moscow State University expansion, Devichye Pole clinics (1897—1900s), Miusskaya Square college (1903).

In 1906—1909 Rerberg, still an associate of Klein, was gradually switching to independent work. In 1906 he won a contest for the first stage of a large apartment building in Meshchansky District funded by the estate of the late G. G. Solodovnikov. The second stage was designed by Marian Peretyatkovich; construction was managed by Traugott Bardt who completed the project in 1909. This building was styled in a mix of Victorian architecture and Art Nouveau; all subsequent work by Rerberg belonged to the school of Russian neoclassical revival.

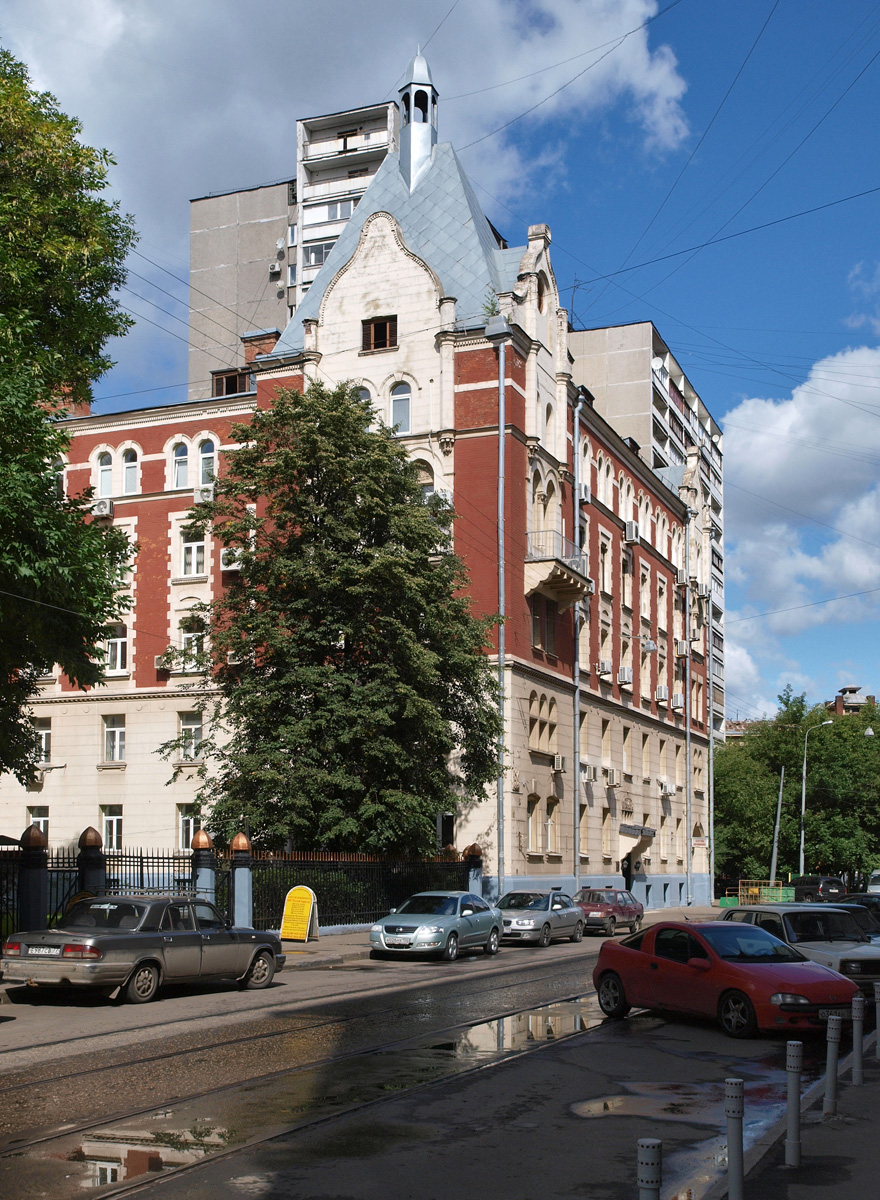
Solodovnikov apartments, 1907—1909

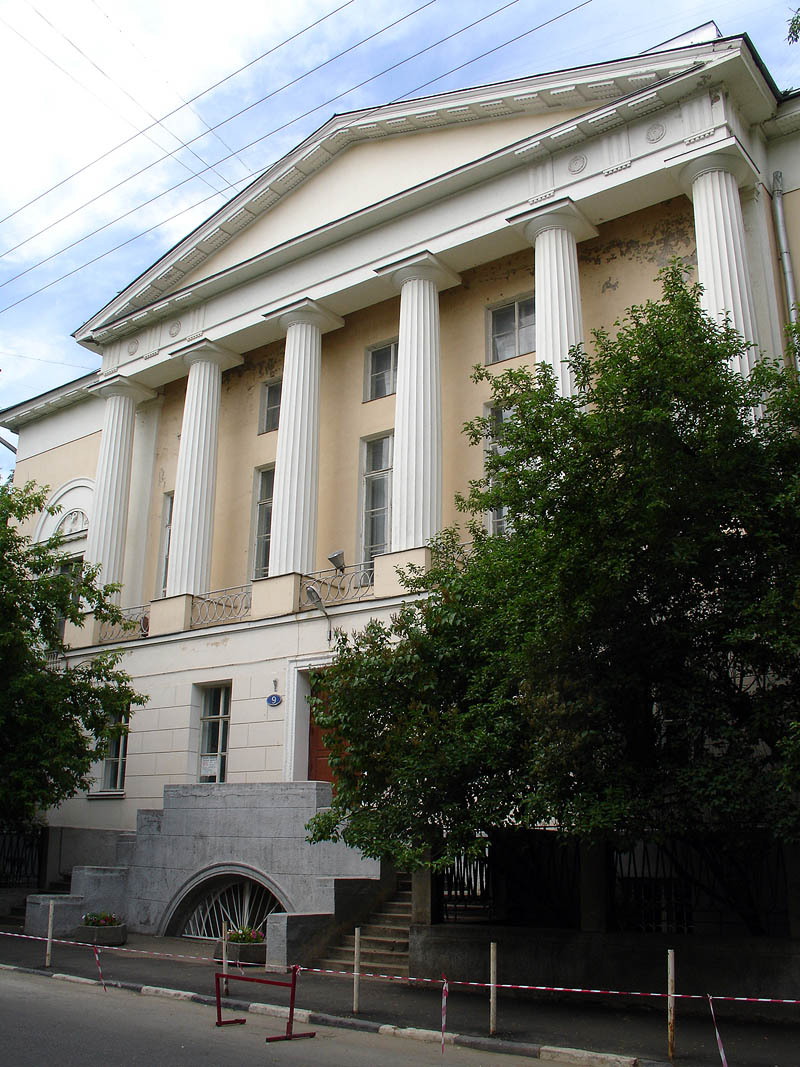
School in Basmanny District, 1912

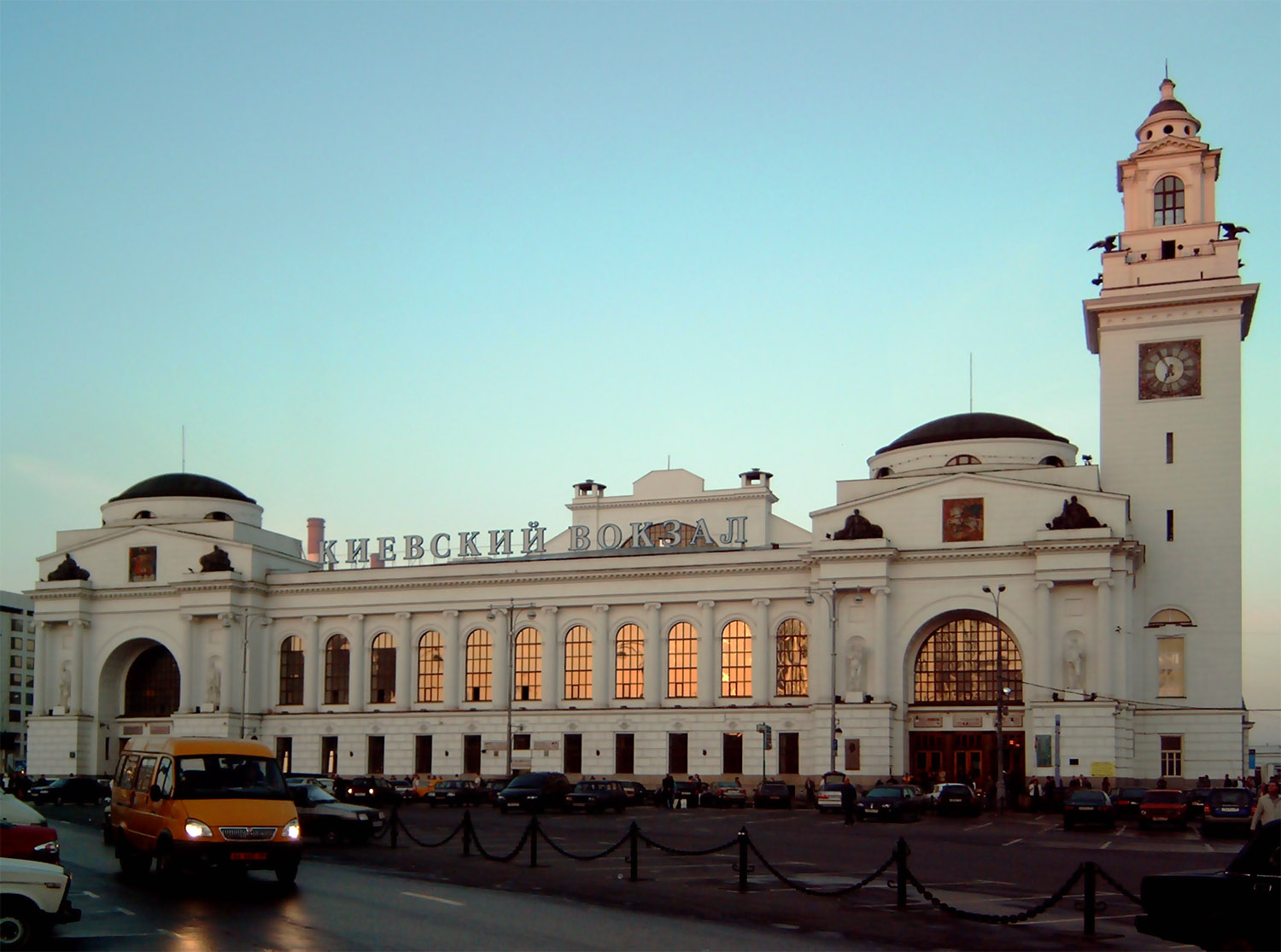
Kievsky rail terminal, 1914—1921

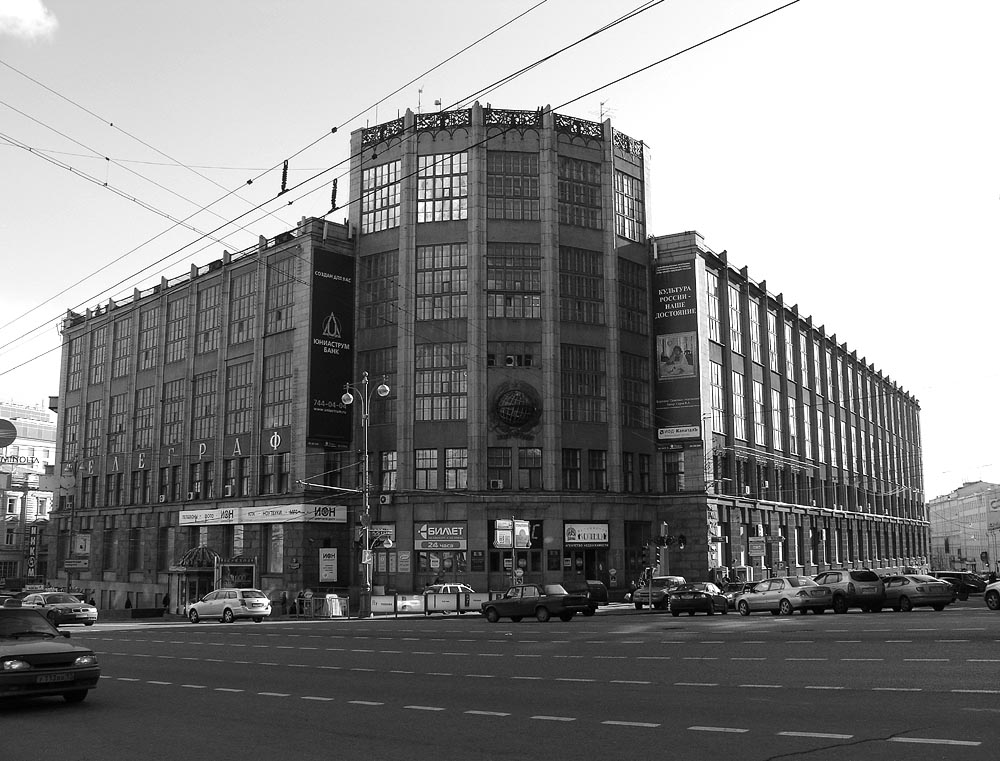
Central Telegraph, 1926–1927

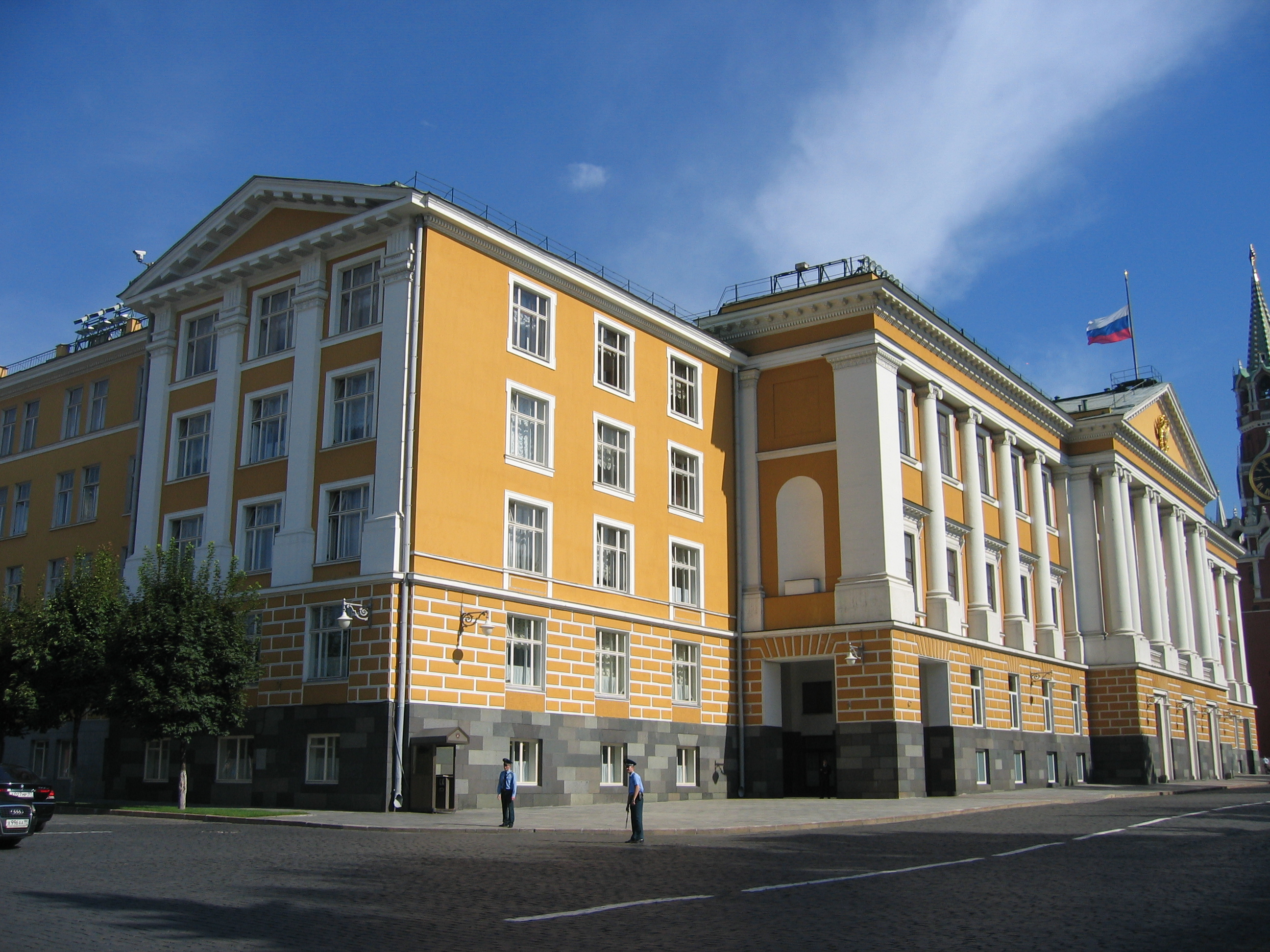
Kremlin Presidium, 1932-1934

In March 1909 Peretyatkovich and Rerberg teamed together to design the Northern Insurance buildings in Kitai-Gorod. Peretyatkovich soon left Moscow, and final, as-build, exterior of the building was shaped by Rerberg alone. This modernized neoclassicism project, completed in 1911, also employed Vyacheslav Oltarzhevsky and then unknown trainee Ilya Golosov. Rerberg's career peaked in the five years that preceded World War I. He designed private residences (present-day Embassy of Indonesia), hospitals, colleges, a high school and a shopping arcade. His last work conceived before World War I, Kievsky Rail Terminal, was substantially completed in 1917; interiors were completed in 1920—1921.

In the period of economic collapse that accompanied the Civil War in Russia, Rerberg was employed by three major theaters of Moscow — Bolshoi, Maly and Moscow Art Theatre. In 1921—1923 he supervised emergency works on reinforcement of Bolshoi Theater foundations that were flooded by a wash from underground Neglinnaya River. Rerberg published proposals for a thorough renovation of Bolshoy, and these were slowly implemented under his supervision until Rerberg's death.

In 1925 Rerberg secured a contract to design Central Telegraph building in Tverskaya Street; the state clients initially opted for a public contest, but were dissatisfied with avant-garde entries and preferred to hire an old school professional. Rerberg's draft was authorized in March 1926, and the building was completed in 1927. Rerberg used reinforced concrete frame and moved all staircases outside of main building shell; this resulted in unusually spacious and well-lit open space offices, new to Moscow construction. Large public area actually accounted for only 4% of its 35,000 meters; most of the space was occupied by actual telegraph and mail-sorting equipment, while 20% were allocated to house the Commissar of Communications with his staff. Later, the space taken by equipment was gradually reduced in favor of offices. Externally, the Telegraph mixed modernist structure of glass panes and granite-clad columns with classical symmetry and quality workmanship and attention to detail associated with Art Deco. The building caused an uproar of avant-garde critics but was praised by mainstream press.

Rerberg's last project, Military College in Kremlin (present-day Administrative Building of Moscow Kremlin) was completed after his death, in 1934.

His grandson Georgy Rerberg is known as a cinematographer.
