= Presidium of the Supreme Soviet of the Soviet Union =

Former legislature of the USSR (1938–90)

Presidium of the Supreme Soviet Президиум Верховного Совета

Type
- Type: Unicameral

History
- Established: 17 January 1938; 88 years ago
- Disbanded: 25 May 1989; 37 years ago
- Preceded by: Central Executive Committee of the Soviet Union
- Succeeded by: President of the Soviet Union (as head of state)
- Seats: 39

Elections
- Voting system: Election by joint session of both houses of the Supreme Soviet

Meeting place
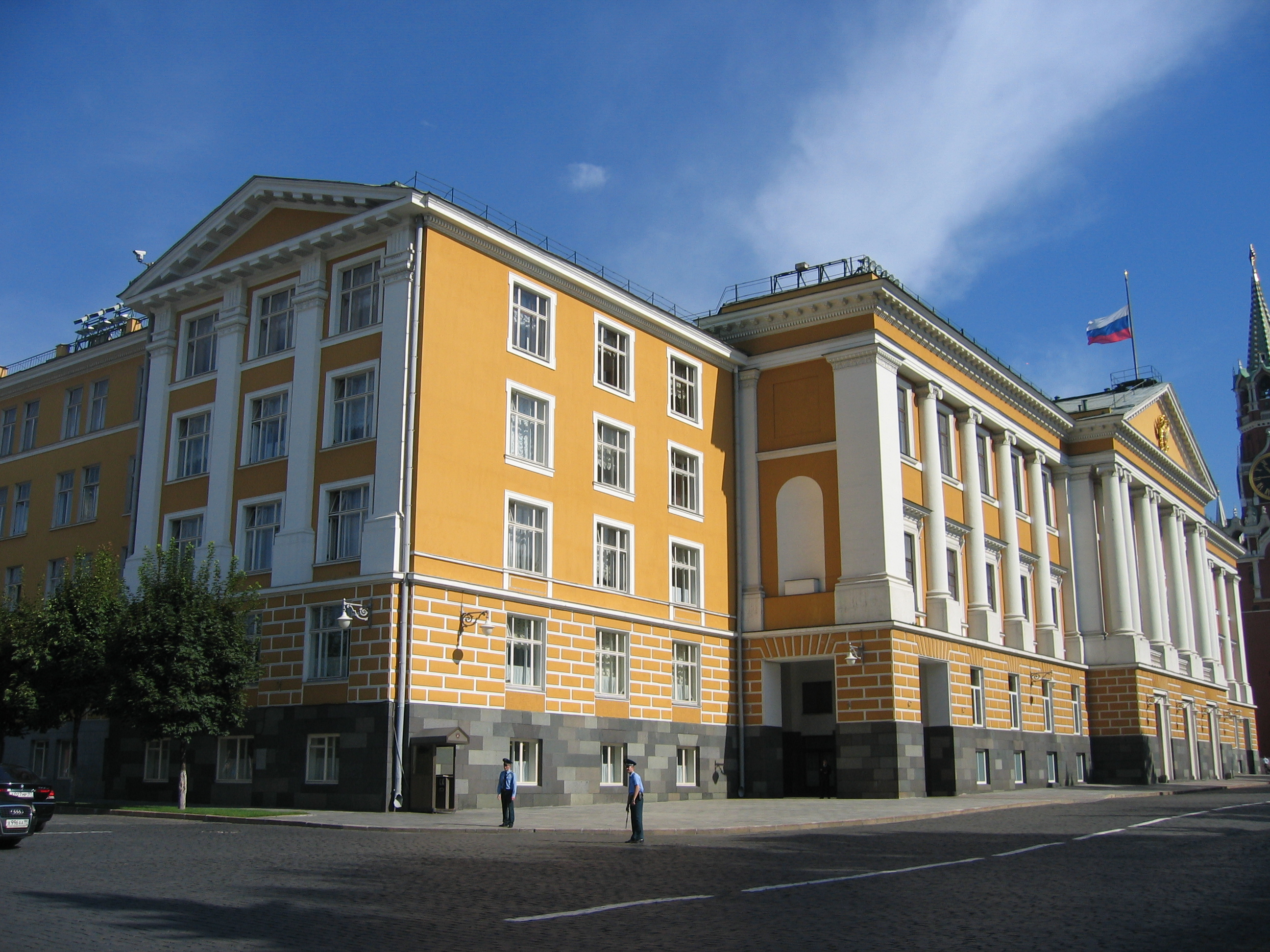
- Kremlin Presidium, Moscow Kremlin; 55.7523°N 37.6200°E

Badge of Deputy of the Supreme Soviet of the Soviet Union

The Presidium of the Supreme Soviet (Russian: Президиум Верховного Совета, romanized: Prezidium Verkhovnogo Soveta) was the standing organ of the highest body of state authority in the Union of Soviet Socialist Republics (USSR). The presidium was elected by joint session of both houses of the Supreme Soviet to act on its behalf while the Supreme Soviet was not in session. By the 1936 and 1977 Soviet Constitution, the Presidium of the Supreme Soviet served as the collective head of state of the USSR. In all its activities, the Presidium was accountable to the Supreme Soviet of the USSR.

Beside the all-Union body they were also in all union republics (e.g.: Presidium of the Supreme Soviet of the Russian SFSR, Presidium of the Ukrainian SSR, etc.) and other regions including autonomous republics. Structure and functions of the presidiums in these republics were virtually identical.

During discussions in regard to the adoption of the 1936 Constitution of the Soviet Union, on proposition to elect the chairman of the Presidium in a nationwide election, Stalin argued:

According to the system of our Constitution, there must not be an individual President in the U.S.S.R., elected by the whole population on a par with the Supreme Soviet and able to put himself in opposition to the Supreme Soviet. The President of the U.S.S.R. is a collegium, it is the Presidium of the Supreme Soviet, including the President of the Presidium of the Supreme Soviet, elected, not by the whole population but by the Supreme Soviet and accountable to the Supreme Soviet. Historical experience shows that such a structure of the supreme bodies is the most democratic and safeguards the country against undesirable contingencies."

== Election ==
The Presidium of the Supreme Soviet was elected by the Supreme Soviet of the USSR at a joint session of both chambers at the first session of each after convocation. The deputies of the Presidium were appointed for the duration of the term of office of the Supreme Soviet. The Presidium of the Supreme Soviet of the USSR consisted of a chairman, a first vice-chairman (after 1977), his 15 deputies (one from each republic), a secretary, and 20 additional deputies from its two constituent chambers, for a total of 39. The Presidium was accountable to the Supreme Soviet of the USSR for all its activities.

From 1938 to 1989, the chairman of the Presidium was regarded as the USSR/Soviet Union's head of state and was sometimes referred to as the "President of the USSR/Soviet Union" in non-Soviet sources.

== The building of the Presidium ==
Its building, situated inside the Moscow Kremlin, was appropriately named the Kremlin Presidium.

== Constitutional powers ==
=== At inception ===
According to the 1936 Constitution of the USSR, as in force as enacted originally (and thus, at the establishment of the Presidium), the basic powers of the Presidium of the Supreme Soviet of the USSR were:

- interpretation of current Soviet laws;
- dissolution of the Supreme Soviet of the USSR on the basis of Article 47 of the 1936 Constitution of the USSR and scheduling new elections: implementing a national referendum on its own initiative or at the request of one of the republics of the Union.
- abrogation of decrees, issued by the Council of Ministers and Council of Ministers of the republics of the Union in case there is a discrepancy with the law;
- relieving the Chairman of the Council of Ministers of his job and appointing Ministers of the USSR (between sessions of the Supreme Soviet) with the subsequent submittal for the Supreme Soviet's approval;
- establishment of orders and medals of the USSR and implementing the awarding procedures.
- establishment of honorary titles of the USSR and their assignment.
- realization of the right to pardon;
- appointment and dismissal of the executive command of the Soviet Armed Forces;
- establishment of military and diplomatic ranks and other special ranks;
- declaration of the general and partial mobilization;
- declaration of war in case of an attack on the USSR or in case when it was necessary to implement obligations of international mutual defense treaties;
- ratification and denunciation of international treaties, signed by the USSR;
- representation of the Supreme Soviet of the USSR (between its sessions) in its relations with parliaments of foreign countries;
- appointment and dismissal of Soviet plenipotentiaries in foreign countries;
- receiving of Letters of Credence and Letters of Recall from foreign diplomatic representatives, accredited in the USSR;
- declaration of the martial law in a given region or across the USSR in the interest of defending the USSR or preserving public order and state security.

The presidium also dealt with questions regarding the acquisition of the Soviet citizenship, its forfeiting or voluntary rejection.

When the Supreme Soviet was not in session, the Presidium carried out the Supreme Soviet's ordinary functions. It was also empowered to issue decrees in lieu of law, which were to be submitted to the Supreme Soviet at its next session. If such decrees were not ratified by the Supreme Soviet, they were to be considered revoked. In practice, the Supreme Soviet's infrequent sessions (it usually sat for only one week per year) and the principles of democratic centralism meant that Presidium decrees de facto had the force of law. It was not unheard of for the CPSU Politburo to bypass the full Supreme Soviet and enact major laws as Presidium decrees. While the Supreme Soviet's power of veto was almost never exercised in practice, it was not unheard of for the Politburo to enact Presidium decrees into legislation without even the formality of submitting them to the full Supreme Soviet for ratification.

As party members made up the majority of members of the presidium, in such plenary sessions or extraordinary ones wherein the Chairman of the Presidium or any high ranking CC-CPSU introduces a relevant CC decision for the resolution of the Presidium or if any decrees would be passed by it, they voted thus in the manner prescribed by the Constitution and laws to wilt that any absolute majority of deputies voting in favor thus approved the law, the same number voting not in favor (not unlike the ones as mentioned before) produced a veto on the draft legislation.

=== At abolition ===
According to the 1977 Constitution of the USSR, as in force at the union's dissolution (and thus, at the abolition of the Presidium), the basic powers of the Presidium of the Supreme Soviet of the USSR were:

- organization of the work of the Supreme Soviet;
- preparation of meetings of the Congress of People's Deputies and sessions of the Supreme Soviet;
- coordination of the work of the committees of the Supreme Soviet;
- organization of nationwide discussion of legislative bills and "other very important matters" in the national level provided that these would be dealt by a plenary of the whole of the Supreme Soviet.

By then, most of the Presidium's former powers were reassigned to the whole Supreme Soviet and to the President of the USSR.

== List of chairmen ==
No. (Note: Repeat head of state and vice heads of state are numbered only once; subsequent terms are marked with their original number italicised. Acting heads of state are not numbered. These numbers are not official.)	Name (Birth–Death)	Portrait	Term of office	Supreme Soviet Convocations (Note: A convocation in the Soviet sense of the word were elected members of Parliament in between elections.)
Chairman of the Presidium of the Supreme Soviet (1938–1989)
1	Mikhail Kalinin (1875–1946)		17 January 1938 – 19 March 1946	1st Convocation
2	Nikolai Shvernik (1888–1970)	A picture taken by the Soviet Government of Nikolai Shvernik in grey	19 March 1946 – 15 March 1953	2nd–3rd Convocation
3	Kliment Voroshilov (1881–1969)		15 March 1953 – 7 May 1960	3rd–5th Convocation
4	Leonid Brezhnev (1906–1982)		7 May 1960 – 15 July 1964	5th–6th Convocation
5	Anastas Mikoyan (1895–1978)		15 July 1964 – 9 December 1965	6th Convocation
6	Nikolai Podgorny (1903–1983)		9 December 1965 – 16 June 1977	6th–9th Convocation
(4)	Leonid Brezhnev (1906–1982)		16 June 1977 – 10 November 1982	9th–10th Convocation
—	Vasily Kuznetsov (1901–1990)		10 November 1982 – 16 June 1983	10th Convocation
7	Yuri Andropov (1914–1984)		16 June 1983 – 9 February 1984	10th Convocation
—	Vasily Kuznetsov (1901–1990)		9 February 1984 – 11 April 1984	10th Convocation
8	Konstantin Chernenko (1911–1985)		11 April 1984 – 10 March 1985	11th Convocation
—	Vasily Kuznetsov (1901–1990)		10 March 1985 – 27 July 1985	11th Convocation
9	Andrei Gromyko (1909–1989)		27 July 1985 – 1 October 1988	11th Convocation
10	Mikhail Gorbachev (1931–2022)		1 October 1988 – 25 May 1989	11th–12th Convocation
10	Chairman of the Supreme Soviet (1989–1990) (Note: On 15 March 1990 most constitutional powers were transferred to the newly created office of President of the Soviet Union. Anatoly Lukyanov was elected Chairman of the Supreme Soviet to replace Mikhail Gorbachev. Although the Chairman's office retained its name, it was now that of a parliamentary speaker, not a head of state. Real executive powers were retained by Gorbachev.)			
10	Mikhail Gorbachev (1931–2022)		25 May 1989 – 15 March 1990	12th Convocation
11	Anatoly Lukyanov (1930–2019)		15 March 1990 – 4 September 1991	12th Convocation

== List of vice chairmen ==
No.	Name (Birth–Death)	Portrait	Term of office	Convocations
First Vice Chairman of the Presidium of the Supreme Soviet (1944–1946) (1977–1989)
1	Nikolai Shvernik (1888–1970)		4 March 1944 – 25 June 1946	1st Convocation
2	Vasily Kuznetsov (1901–1990)		7 October 1977 – 18 June 1986	9th–11th Convocation
3	Pyotr Demichev (1917–2010)		18 June 1986 – 1 October 1988	11th Convocation
4	Anatoly Lukyanov (1930–2019)		1 October 1988 – 25 May 1989	11th–12th Convocation
4	Vice Chairman of the Supreme Soviet (1989–1990)			
4	Anatoly Lukyanov (1930–2019)		25 May 1989 – 15 March 1990	12th Convocation

== See also ==
- List of heads of state of the Soviet Union
- General Secretary of the Communist Party of the Soviet Union
- Presidium of the Supreme Soviet of the Russian Soviet Federative Socialist Republic
- Presidium of the Supreme Soviet of the Ukrainian Soviet Socialist Republic
- Standing Committee of the National People's Congress
