= Small Nicholas Palace =

Former palace within the Moscow Kremlin

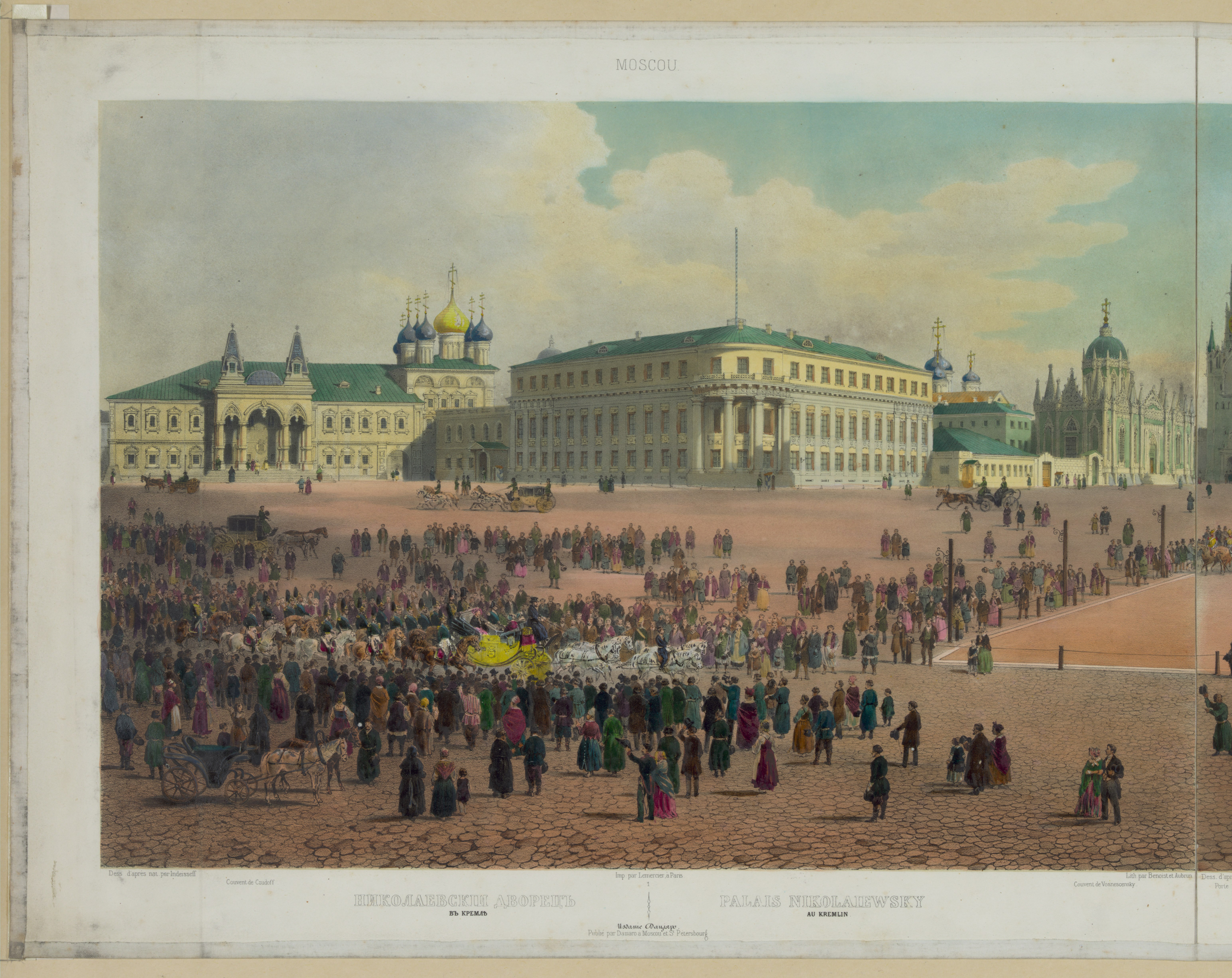
The Small Nicholas Palace, flanked by the Chudov Monastery on the left and the Ascension Convent on the right

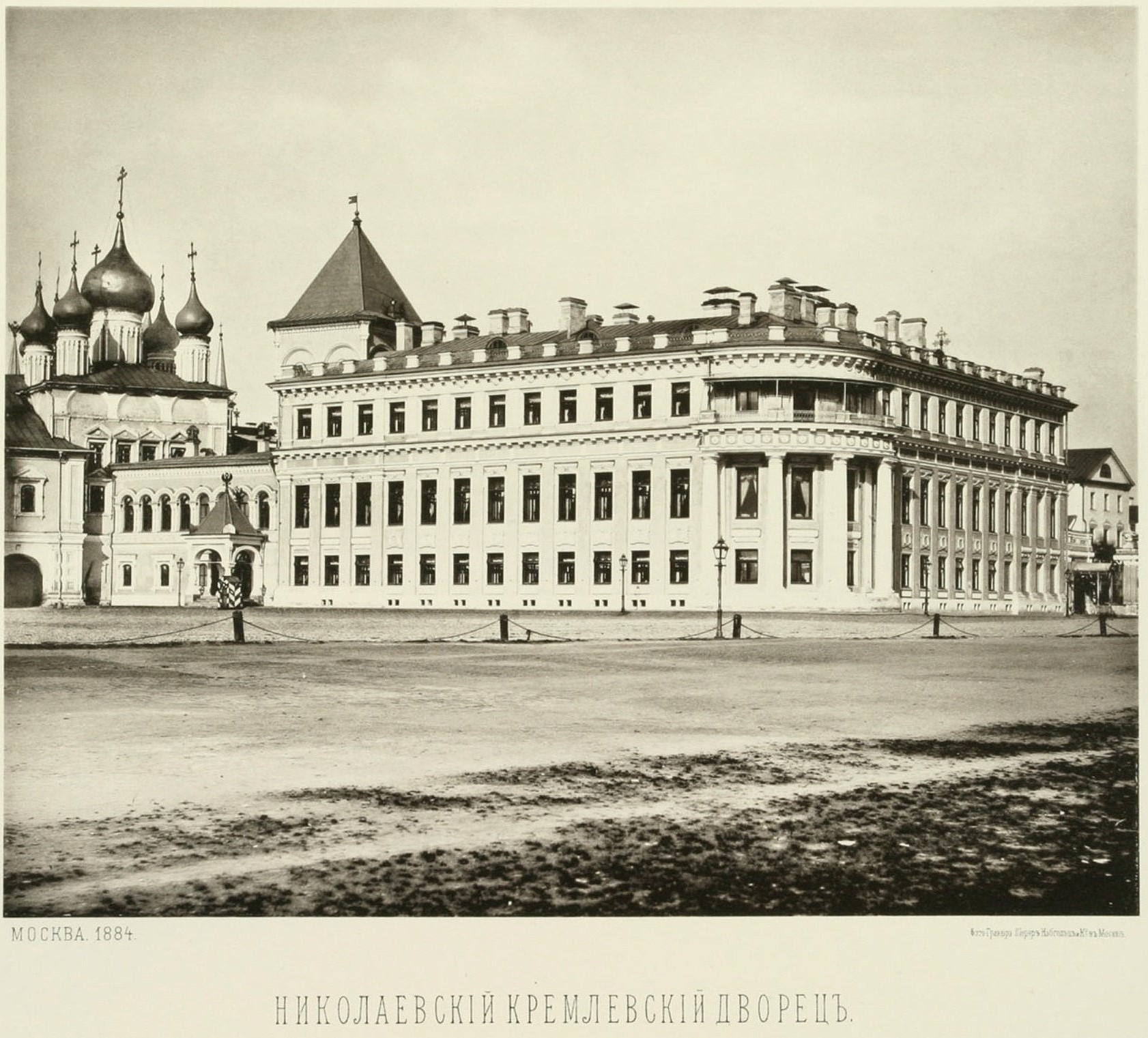
The Small Nicholas Palace in 1884

The Small Nicholas Palace (also known as the Maly Nikolayevsky Palace) (Russian: Малый Николаевский дворец) was a three-storey neoclassical building situated within the Moscow Kremlin, at the corner of Ivanovskaya Square. Constructed in 1775 as the residence of the head of the Moscow Eparchy, it was later converted into the official Moscow residence of the Imperial family. Until the construction of the Grand Kremlin Palace between 1838 and 1849, it served as the principal residence of the Russian monarchs during their stays in Moscow. The palace was particularly associated with Grand Duke Nicholas Pavlovich, the future Emperor Nicholas I, and remained closely linked to the imperial household throughout the nineteenth century.

As part of the historic Kremlin ensemble adjoining the Chudov and Ascension monasteries, the palace occupied a prominent position within the medieval heart of Moscow. Like many architectural monuments within the Kremlin, it did not survive the Soviet period. In 1929, the Small Nicholas Palace was demolished together with the neighbouring monasteries. Between 1932 and 1934, the Kremlin Presidium (also known as Building No. 14) was erected on the site. The new structure housed key institutions of the Soviet Union, including the Supreme Soviet of the USSR—the highest legislative body of the Soviet Union until its dissolution in 1991—and later offices of the Presidential Administration of the Russian Federation until 2011. The Kremlin Presidium itself was dismantled in 2016.

Today, only archaeological remains mark the former presence of the Small Nicholas Palace within the Kremlin.

== History ==
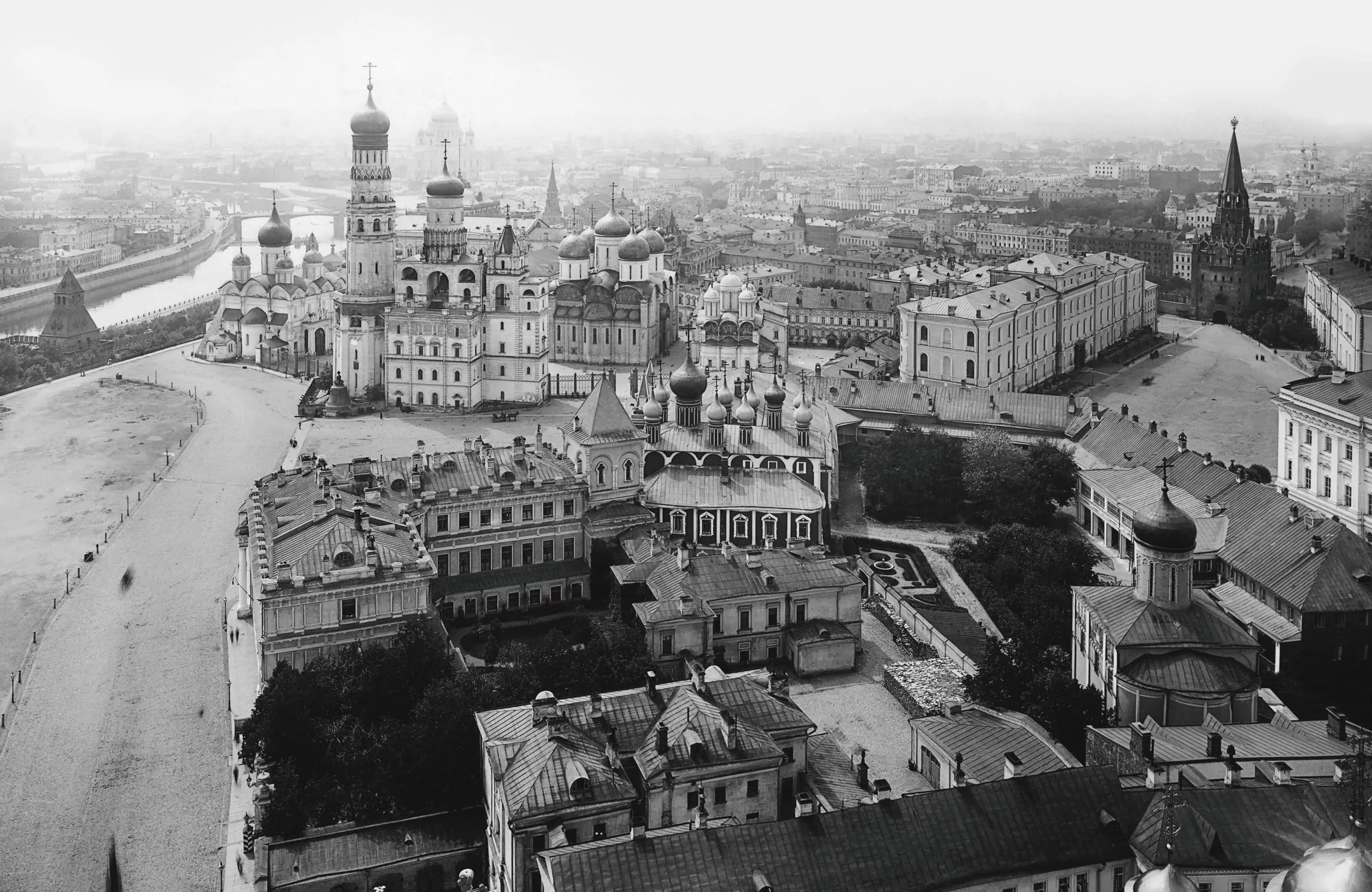
The Small Nicholas Palace seen from above (1910)

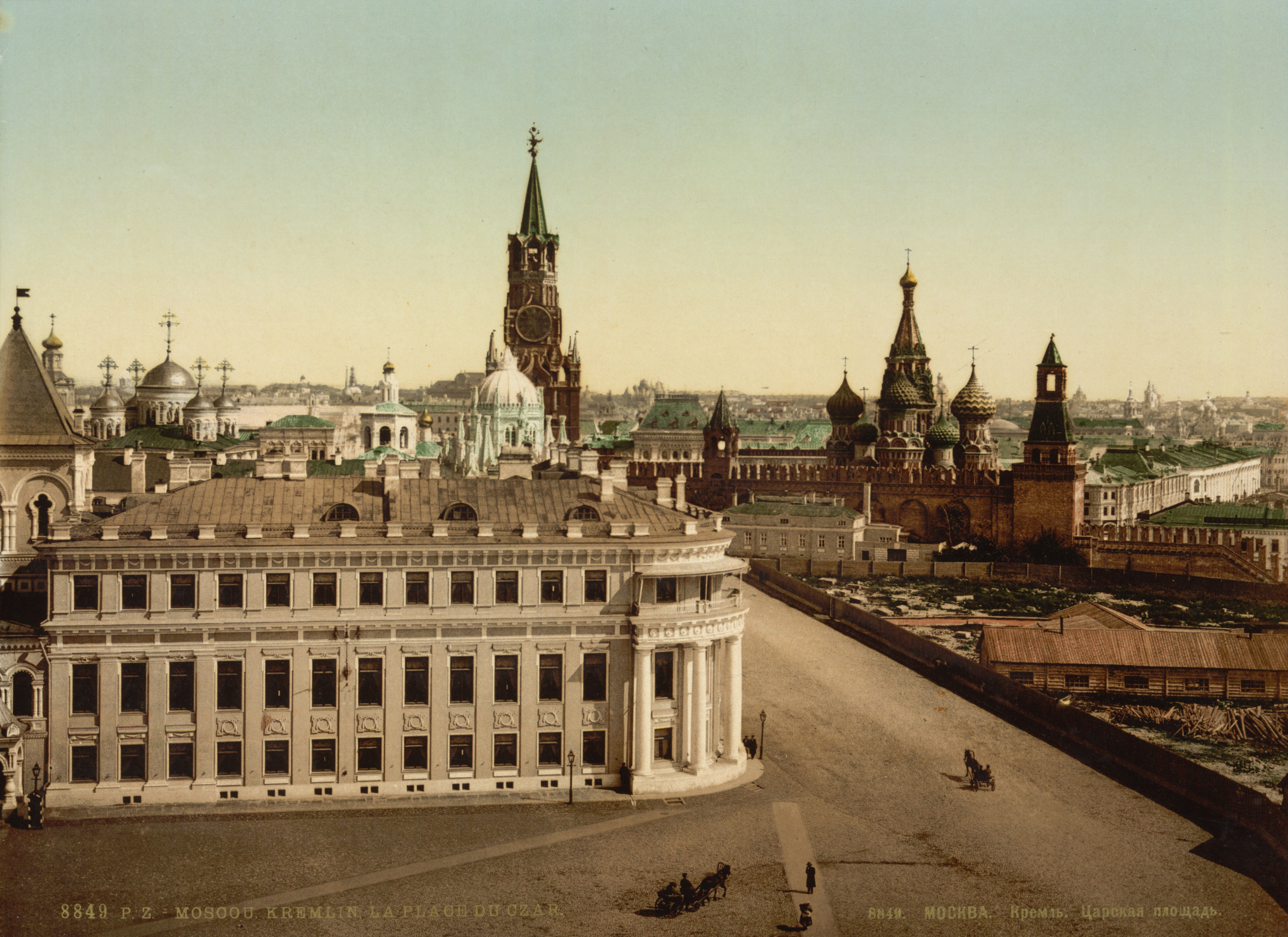
The Small Nicholas Palace seen from the Ivan the Great Bell Tower (1896-1897)

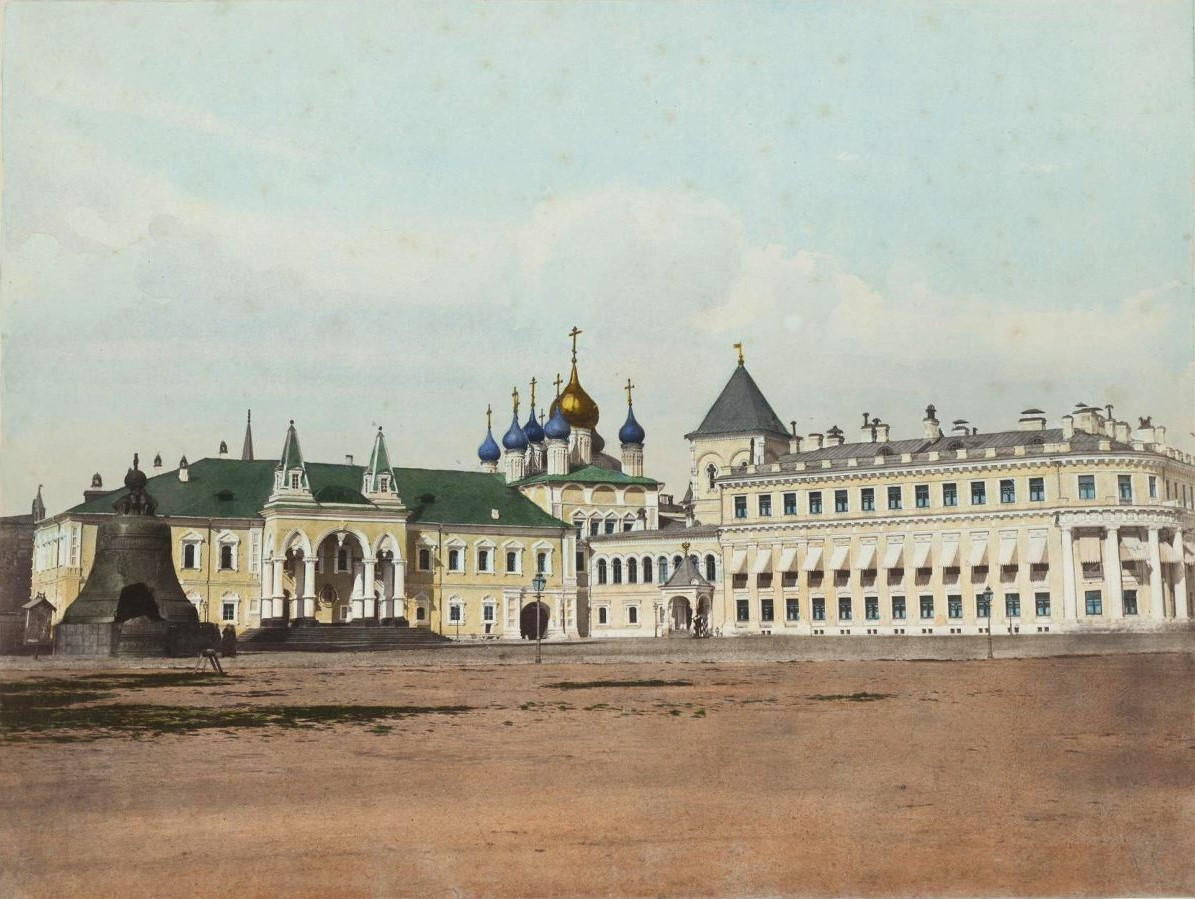
The Small Nicholas Palace in 1880

=== Early history ===
Presumably, in the early 14th century, the site later occupied by the Small Nicholas Palace contained a residence for the ambassador of the Golden Horde.

In 1365, the land was granted to Metropolitan Alexius, who founded the Chudov Monastery on most of the plot. During the reign of Ivan III of Russia, the remaining portion was occupied by a palace built for his younger son, Prince Yury Ivanovich.

In the autumn of 1560, during the reign of Ivan the Terrible, Yuri of Dmitrov’s residence was demolished and replaced with a palace for Prince Yuri of Uglich. After the latter’s death in 1563, the residence was purchased by the voivode and okolnichy boyar Ivan Sheremetev, who paid the exceptionally large sum of 7,800 rubles for the Kremlin property. Under Tsar Michael Romanov, the estate belonged to the prominent landowner Boris Morozov.

=== The Bishop’s Palace and the Plague Riot of 1771 ===
In 1667, the site passed into the possession of the Chudov Monastery. By decree of the Holy Synod, a residence for the head of the Diocese of Moscow was constructed there in 1744. The Bishop’s Palace had an angular layout; its principal façade faced Ivanovskaya Square and was separated from it by a stone wall. According to a plan drawn up by the archaeologist Alexander Veltman, the building stood somewhat apart from the monastery’s churches and other structures.

In 1771, a plague epidemic broke out in Moscow. In an effort to slow the spread of the disease, Archbishop Ambrose of Moscow attempted to limit the mass gatherings of worshippers venerating sacred relics. By his order, the highly revered Bogolubovo Icon of the Mother of God was removed from the chapel at the Varvarsky Gate. This action provoked an enraged crowd to storm the Kremlin and devastate the Bishop’s Palace. Ambrose managed to take refuge in the Donskoy Monastery but was captured and killed the following day. By the time troops under Pyotr Eropkin suppressed the uprising, the palace had been completely destroyed.

=== Kazakov’s neoclassical Palace ===
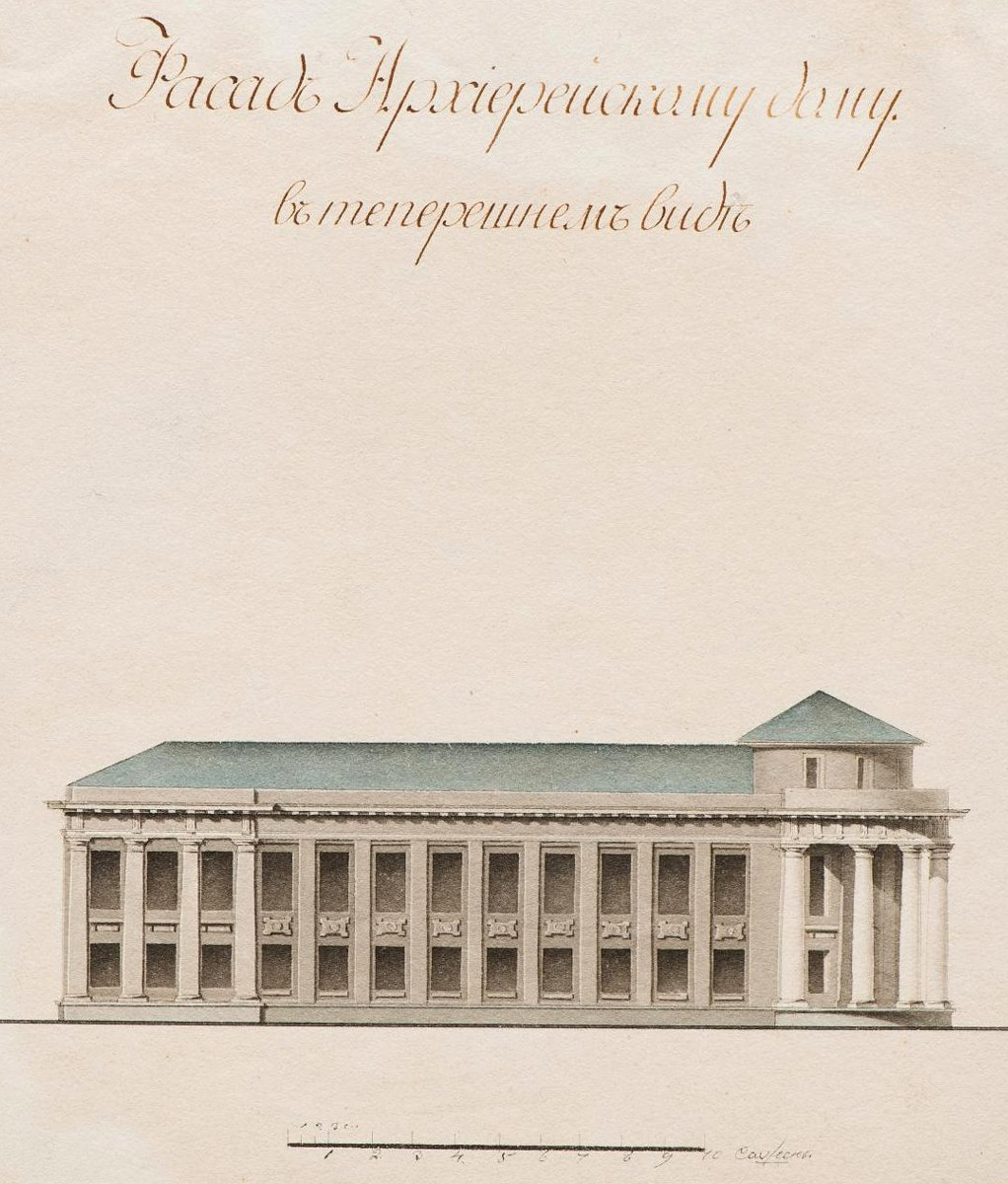
The Chudov Palace was originally constructed as a two-storey building

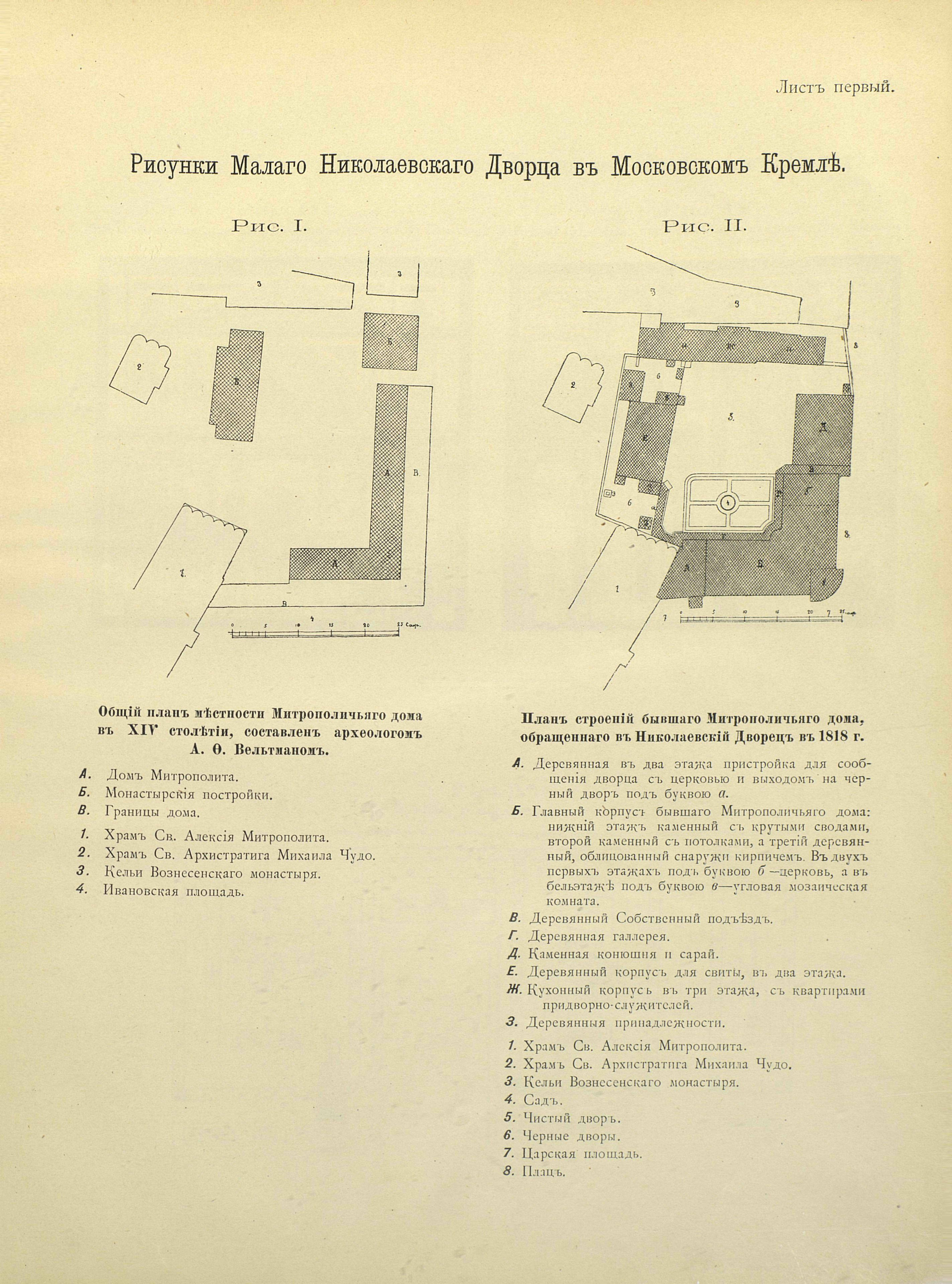
Plan of the Small Nicholas Palace

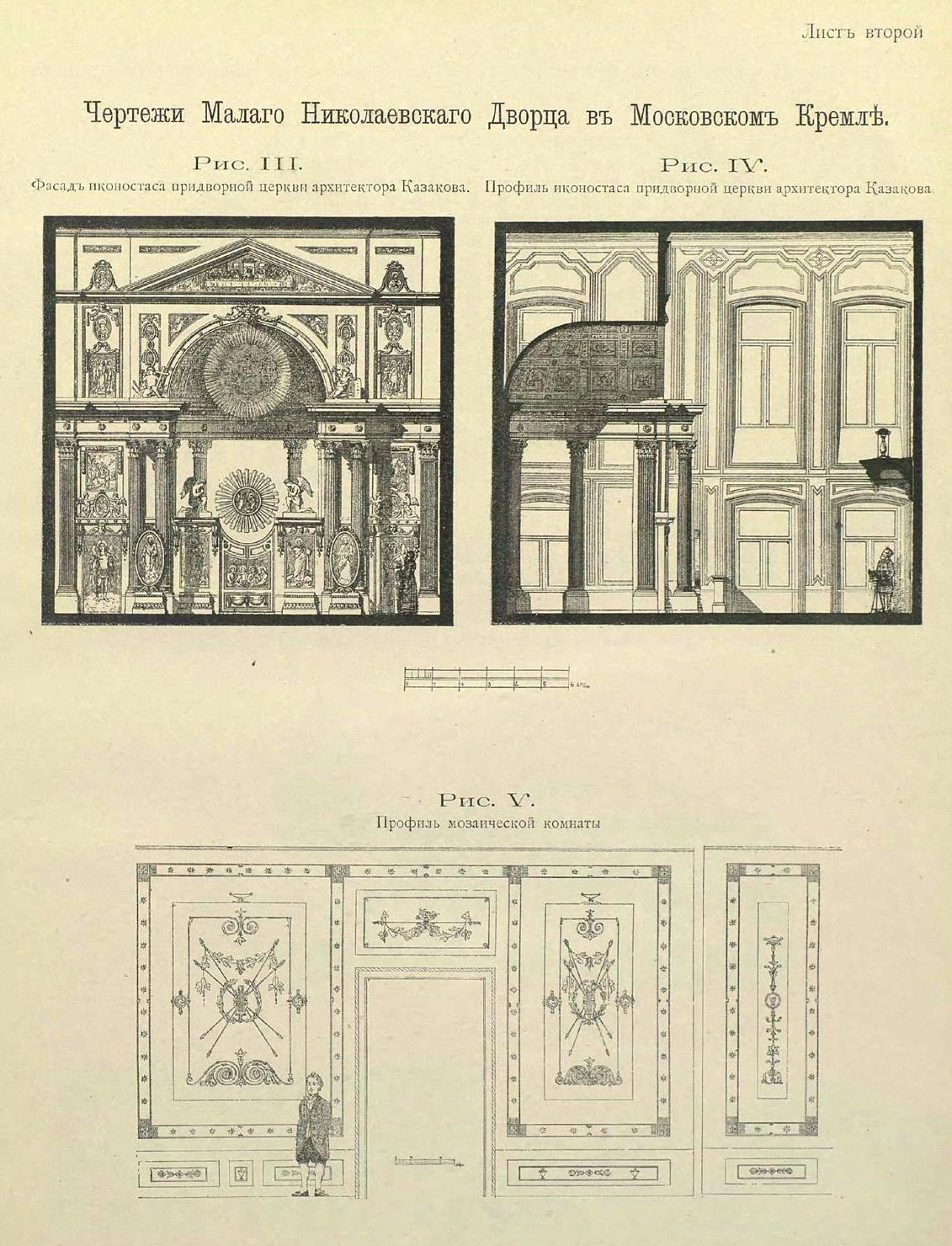
Interior drawings of the palace

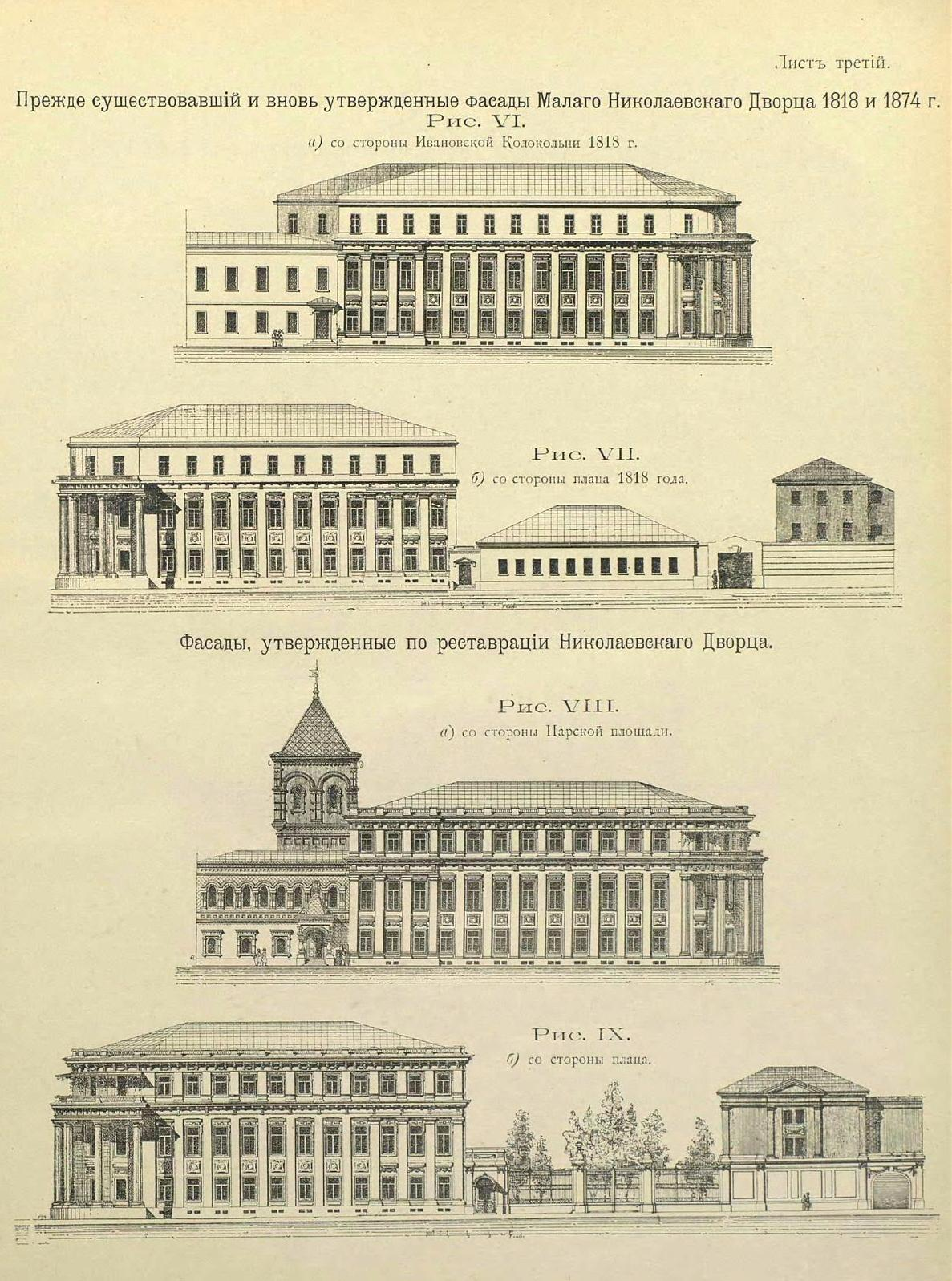
Exterior drawings of the palace

In 1775, Catherine the Great appointed Platon Levshin—formerly court preacher and tutor to the heir to the throne, the future Paul I—as head of the Moscow Eparchy. Upon assuming office, he initiated the construction of a new residence, for which the Empress allocated 40,000 rubles. The project was entrusted to the renowned architect Matvey Kazakov, who had previously built an episcopal residence for Platon in Tver.

The new palace, also situated at the corner of Ivanovskaya Square and Spasskaya Street, was designed in the neoclassical style. Its principal architectural feature was a semi-rotunda with four Tuscan columns, crowned by a belvedere bearing the archbishop’s monogram. The ground floor, with its low vaulted ceilings, was used primarily for storage, while the metropolitan’s apartments were located on the piano nobile. In the eastern corner stood a private Church of Saints Peter and Paul, whose iconostasis was designed by Kazakov. The building stood almost flush with the monastery walls and was therefore popularly known as the Chudov Palace. Members of the imperial family frequently stayed there as guests of Platon. In 1797, during the coronation of Paul I of Russia, the Tsarevich Alexander Pavlovich, the future Emperor Alexander I, resided in the Bishop’s House.

In 1811, Metropolitan Platon fell gravely ill and was compelled to leave both his office and his residence. During the French occupation of Moscow in 1812, the vacant building was selected by Napoleon as his military headquarters.

=== Conversion into the Small Nicholas Palace ===
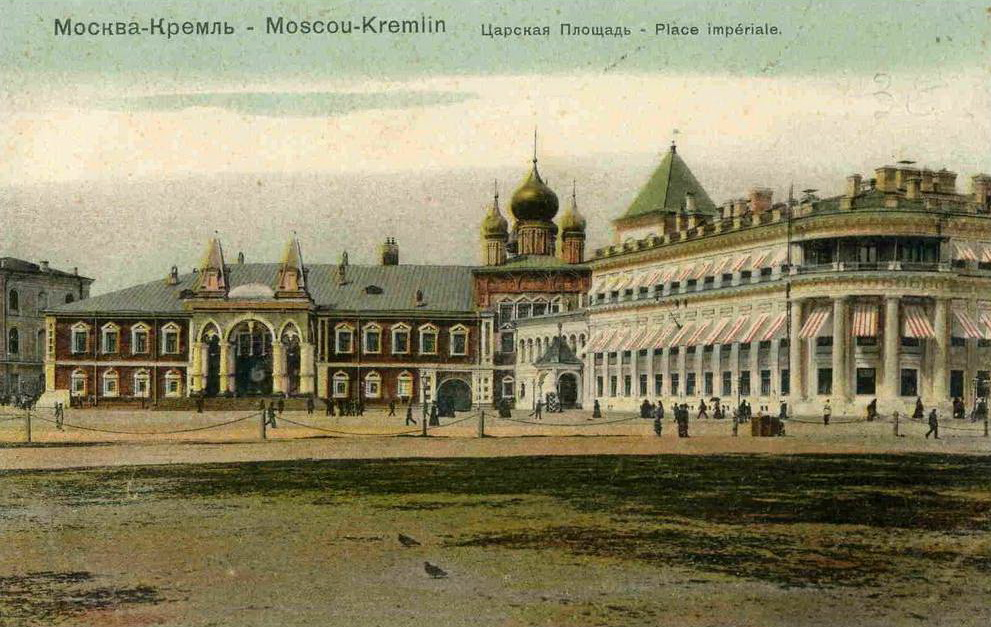
The Chudov Monastery and the Small Nicholas Palace

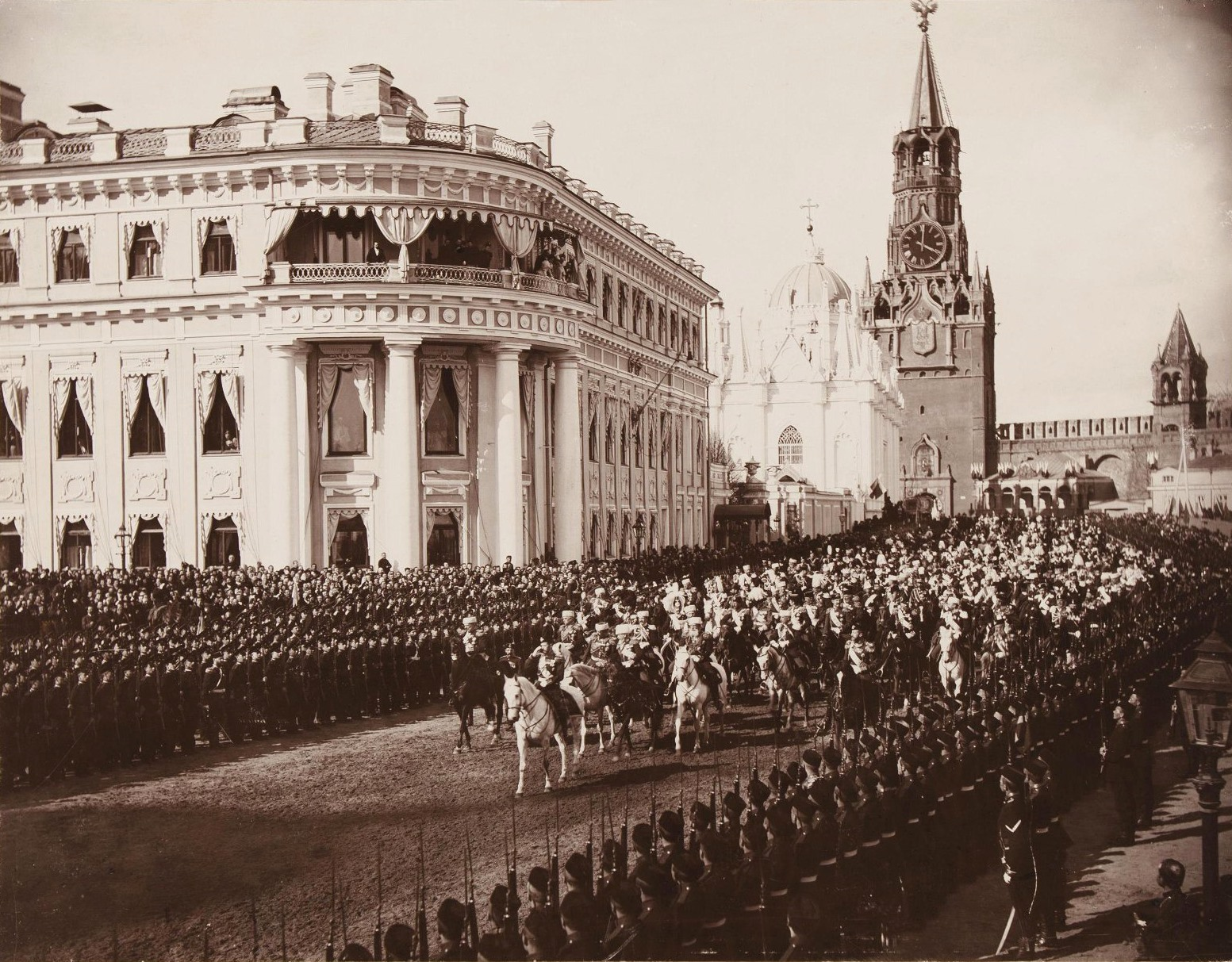
The ceremonial entry of Nicholas II into the Kremlin during the coronation celebrations, with the Small Nicholas Palace in the background, 9 May 1896

After the liberation of Moscow, the building—damaged by explosions—was restored and, by 1817, transferred to the Palace Administration. At the command of Alexander I, it was converted into the personal residence of his brother Grand Duke Nicholas Pavlovich, the future Emperor Nicolas I of Russia. By long-standing custom, it continued to be known as the Chudov Palace; from 1831 it was also referred to as the Nicholas Palace or the Small Kremlin Palace, designations that were later combined.

Until the construction of the Grand Kremlin Palace, it served as the principal residence of the Russian monarchs during their stays in Moscow. On 17 (29) April 1818, the firstborn son of Grand Duke Nicholas Pavlovich and Alexandra Feodorovna—the future Emperor Alexander II of Russia—was born in the Small Nicholas Palace. He would later regard it as the home of his childhood.

In 1824, the building underwent substantial remodelling. By order of Prince Pyotr Volkonsky, Minister of the Imperial Court, the work was entrusted to Ivan Mironovsky. According to the approved design, a third wooden storey, externally clad in brick, was added to accommodate children’s rooms and dressing rooms. The ground floor housed members of the imperial retinue, while the second floor contained the private apartments of the imperial family. These rooms were finished with artificial marble and upholstered in silk. A corner room above the semi-rotunda featured glazed niches from which the residents could greet the public assembled below. Its walls were likewise faced with marble and decorated in the Pompeian style by the artist-decorator Giuseppe Artari.

To connect the palace with the Church of Saint Alexius of the Chudov Monastery, two-storey wooden passageways were constructed. On the eastern side, a single-storey wooden corridor was added along the rear façade, opening onto the square; this became known as His Majesty’s Private Entrance.

On 8 September 1826, a historic meeting took place in the palace between Tsar Nicholas I and Alexander Pushkin following the poet’s exile to Mikhaylovskoye. Art historians regard this encounter as a decisive turning point in Pushkin’s literary career. Nicholas I also received the poet Alexander Polezhayev there; after their conversation, the young man was sent into military service.

Toward the end of his reign, Nicholas I conceived plans to remodel the palace in the Russian Revival style. In 1851 architect Konstantin Thon prepared a redesign that proposed lowering the roof, erecting a tower with a spiral staircase, replacing the wooden passageways with stone structures, and adding a porch crowned by a tented dome. Of these proposals, only the last two were implemented.

Following Nicholas I’s death, funding for further works was discontinued, as Alexander II preferred to preserve the building’s historic appearance, declaring:

It is far more pleasing to me to have the old palace repaired without alteration than a newly built one with Thon’s façade.

=== Restoration under Alexander II ===
Subsequent reconstruction proposals for the aging structure were submitted by Nikolai Chichagov (1857), Fyodor Richter (1866), and Pyotr Gerasimov (1868), but all were rejected because they envisaged a complete rebuilding of the palace.

In 1872, the restoration was entrusted to the architect-restorer Nikolai Shokhin. The principal requirements were the preservation of the palace’s historic exterior and interior decoration, and the assurance that the emperor could occupy the residence at any time. Shokhin reinforced the foundations, replaced the wooden ceilings of the third storey with stone vaulting, installed a lifting mechanism in the vestibule, remodeled the basement rooms, and modernized the water supply. During the works, mass graves were discovered and subsequently reinterred behind the inner garden near the Cathedral of the Miracle of the Archangel Michael. At the request of Empress Maria Alexandrovna, military engineer Genrikh Voynitsky designed a heating system comparable to that of the Winter Palace. The restoration, completed in 1878, cost 400,000 rubles.

In 1905, Grand Duke Sergei Alexandrovich of Russia took up residence in the Small Nicholas Palace. Having received repeated threats, he believed that security could be more effectively ensured within the Kremlin. Nevertheless, on 4 February he was assassinated while traveling from the palace to the residence of the Moscow Governor-General.

=== Revolution, Soviet Reuse, and Demolition ===
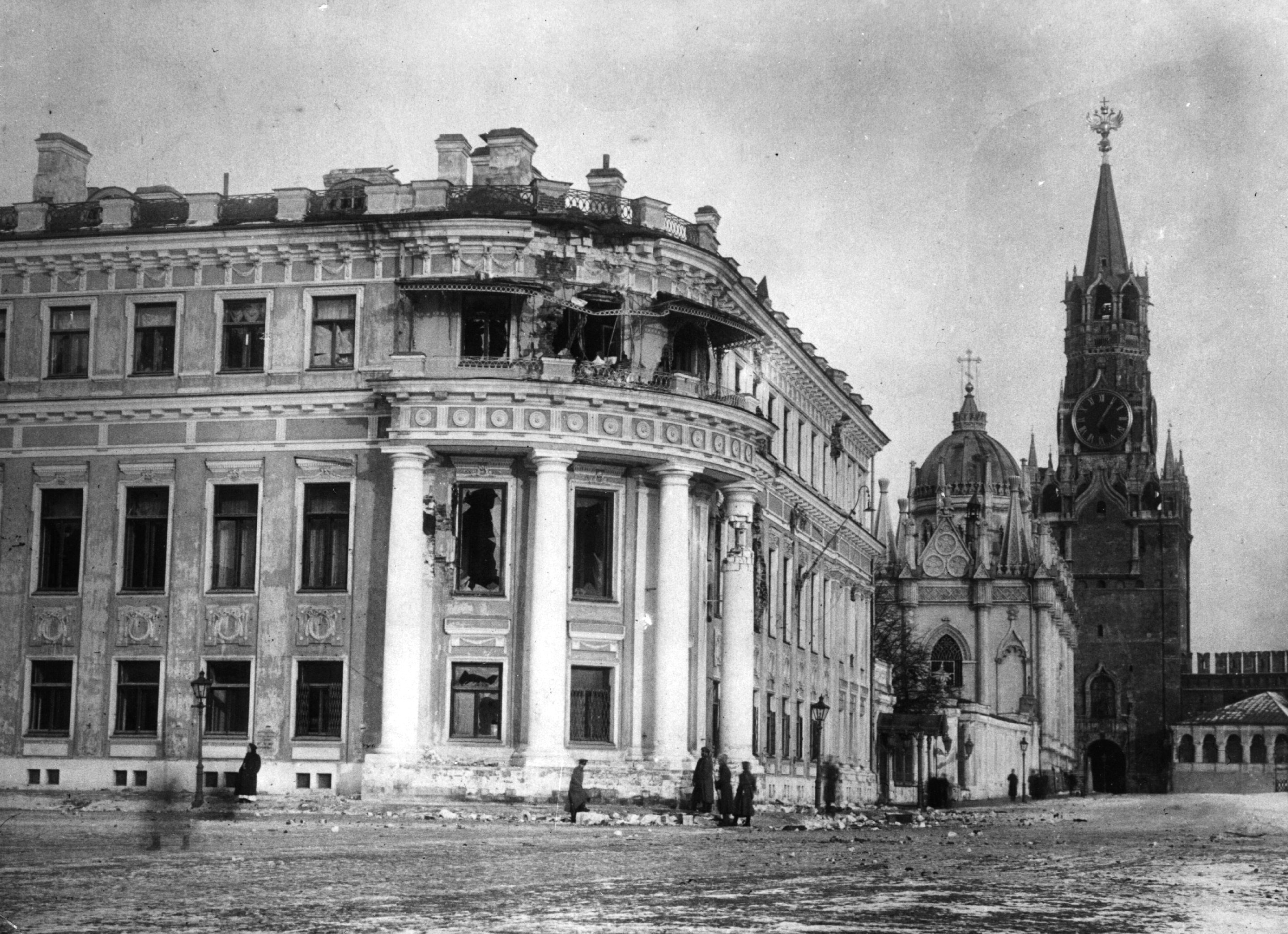
The Small Nicholas Palace in the aftermath of the 1917 shelling

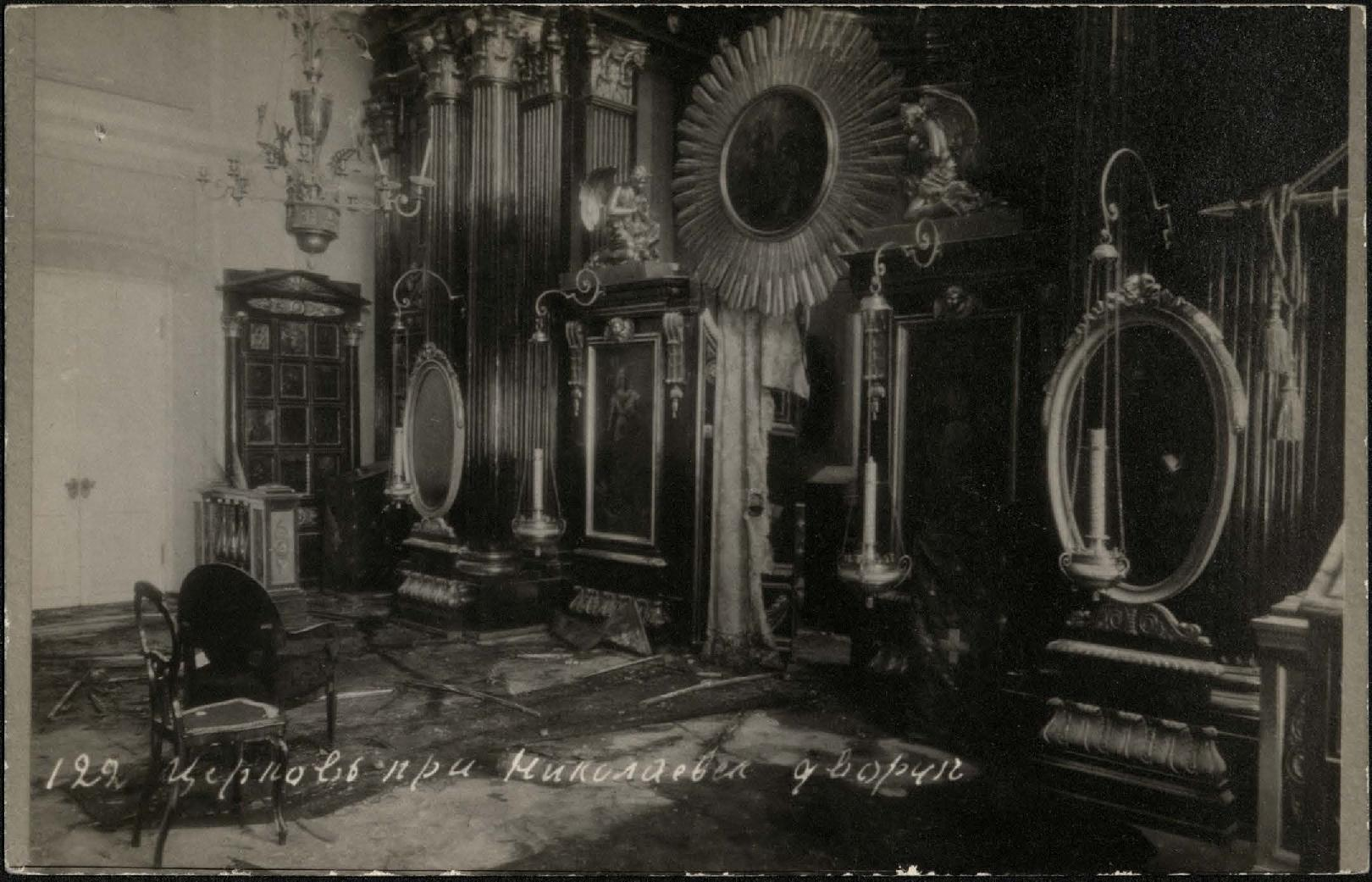
Iconostasis of the Church of Saints Peter and Paul in the Small Nicholas Palace after the shelling of 1917

During the October Armed Uprising of 1917 in Moscow, the Small Nicholas Palace served as the headquarters of the Junkers (a military rank in the Russian Guard and Army, until 1918) who supported the Committee of Public Safety. Consequently, it became a primary target for the Red Guards and sustained heavier damage than most other buildings within the Kremlin. Two 48-line artillery guns, from which the palace and the Spasskaya Tower were shelled, were positioned on the southwestern slope of Tagansky Hill, known as Shvivaya Gorka. Metropolitan Nestor later described the devastation:

The Small Nicholas Palace… suffered greatly from artillery bombardment. Enormous gaping breaches are visible on the exterior. Inside, too, everything was destroyed; when I had to walk through all the rooms, I beheld a scene of total ruin. Huge mirrors and other furnishings of the palace were barbarously smashed and wrecked. Cabinets were broken open; books, files, and papers lay scattered throughout the rooms… The church was struck by a shell and laid waste. The iconostasis was shattered; the force of the explosions flung open the Royal Doors, and the church curtain was torn in two. Many valuable icons were looted from here.

On 6 July 1918, the palace was again damaged during the shelling of the Kremlin by insurgent Left Socialist-Revolutionaries. In the summer of that year, the building was restored on the orders of Vladimir Lenin, and in 1919 it became the premises of the First Moscow Soviet Machine-Gun Courses for the training of Red Army commanders. The private Church of Saints Peter and Paul was converted into an auditorium and later housed art and sculpture workshops of the staff club of the All-Russian Central Executive Committee. Efforts by the People's Commissariat for Education to preserve the iconostasis designed by Kazakov proved unsuccessful, and it was dismantled in 1923.

=== Demolition and construction of the Kremlin Presidium ===
In 1929, the Small Nicholas Palace was demolished despite protests from museum professionals who emphasized its high artistic and historical value. Between 1932 and 1934, the Kremlin Presidium also known as Building No. 14 was erected on the site, becoming the first new structure constructed within the Kremlin after the Russian Revolution. The project is most commonly attributed to Ivan Rerberg, although some researchers have argued that the architect was Vladimir Apyshkov.

. Initially, Building No. 14 housed a joint military school of the Red Army. From 1968 onward, the Round Hall of the building served as a meeting place for the chambers of the Supreme Soviet of the Soviet Union. In later years, it accommodated a reserve presidential office and the Presidential Administration of Russia.

== Present day ==
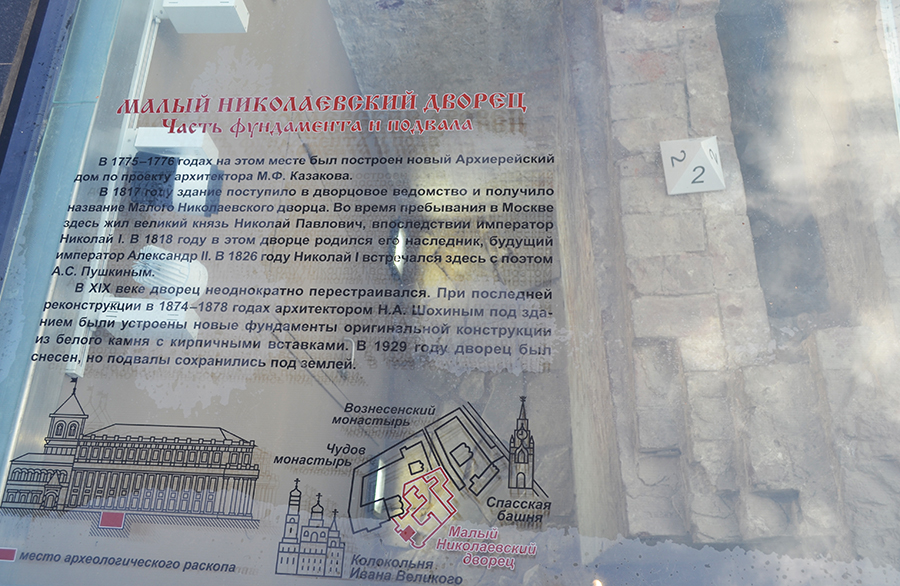
Glazed archaeological trenches expose fragments of the palace

In 2014, restoration work on the Kremlin Presidium, which had been in progress for two years, was suspended following the decision to dismantle the building. For some time, there had been speculation about the possible reconstruction of the architectural monuments that once occupied the site—the Chudov Monastery and the Small Nicholas Palace. However, in 2017 the Director of the Moscow Kremlin Museums announced that no new construction was planned for the area.

In May 2016, a landscaped park was inaugurated on the site of the former administrative building, forming part of a newly created tourist route through the Kremlin. Its principal features are glazed archaeological trenches that expose fragments of the foundations of the Small Nicholas Palace, as well as those of the Ascension Convent and the Chudov Monastery.

In 2017, a historical film incorporating 3D reconstructions of the palace was presented at an arts centre located on the grounds of the Cathedral of Christ the Saviour.
