= Ivanovskaya Square =

City square in Moscow Kremlin

Coordinates: 55°45′06″N 37°37′08″E

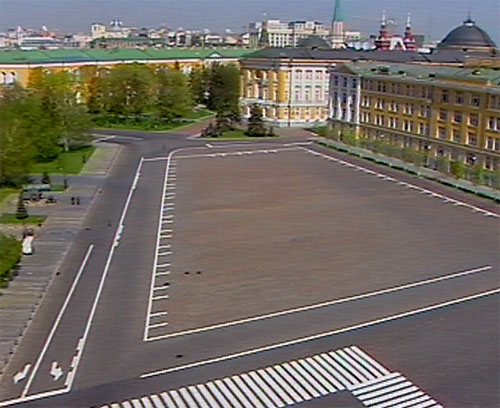
The square pictured in 2008

Ivanovskaya Square (Russian: Ивановская площадь) is the largest Moscow Kremlin square. Its name comes from the Ivan the Great Bell Tower.

In the 16th and 17th centuries, many government bodies were situated in the Ivanovskaya Square. It was the site of the prikazy, the equivalent of today's ministries. Court services and chanceries of various departments were also situated here.

At the end of the 1920s and early 1930s, the square was enlarged after the demolition of the Small Nicholas Palace and the Ascension Convent.

Today, the square is cobbled like most of the territory of the Kremlin. It offers a view of one of the three corners of the Kremlin Senate.

== Gallery ==
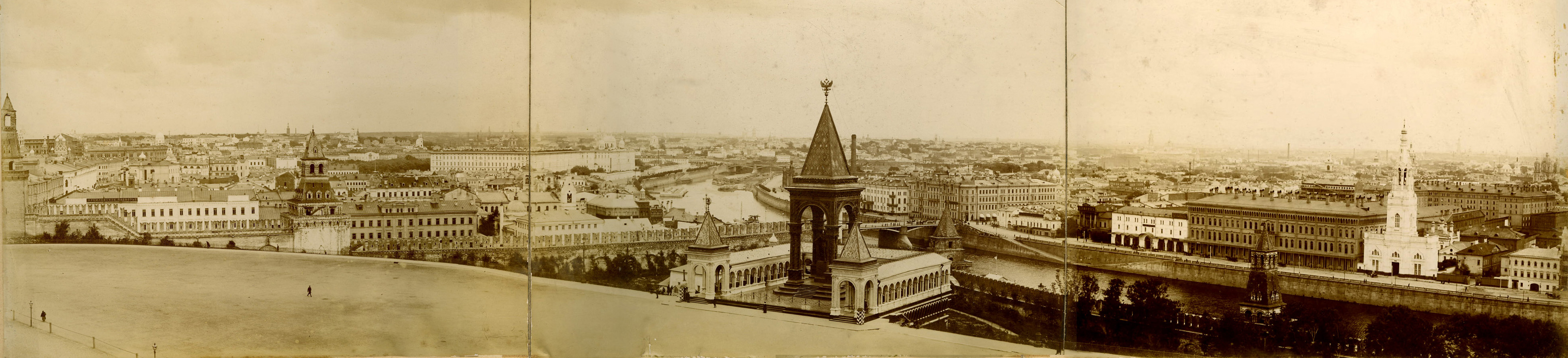
Ivanovskaya Square on a 1901 photo

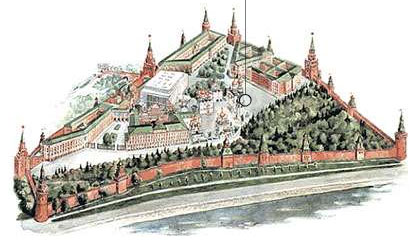
Location of the Square

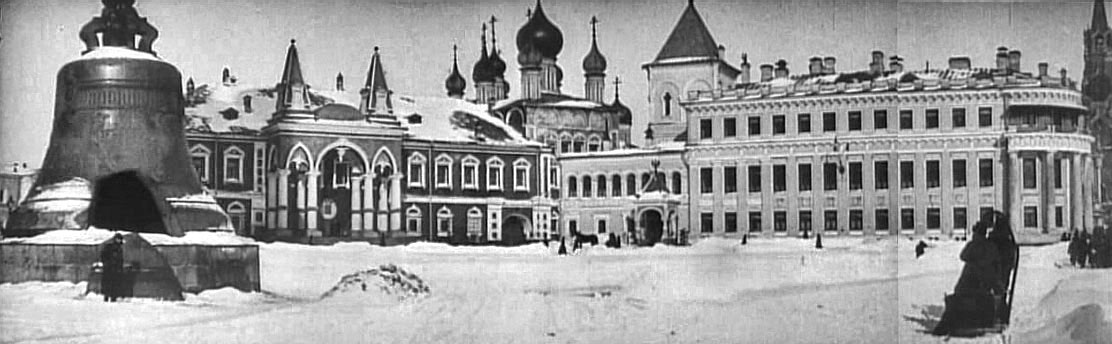
Ivanovskaya Square in 1908
