= Renaissance architecture =

15th–16th-century European architectural style

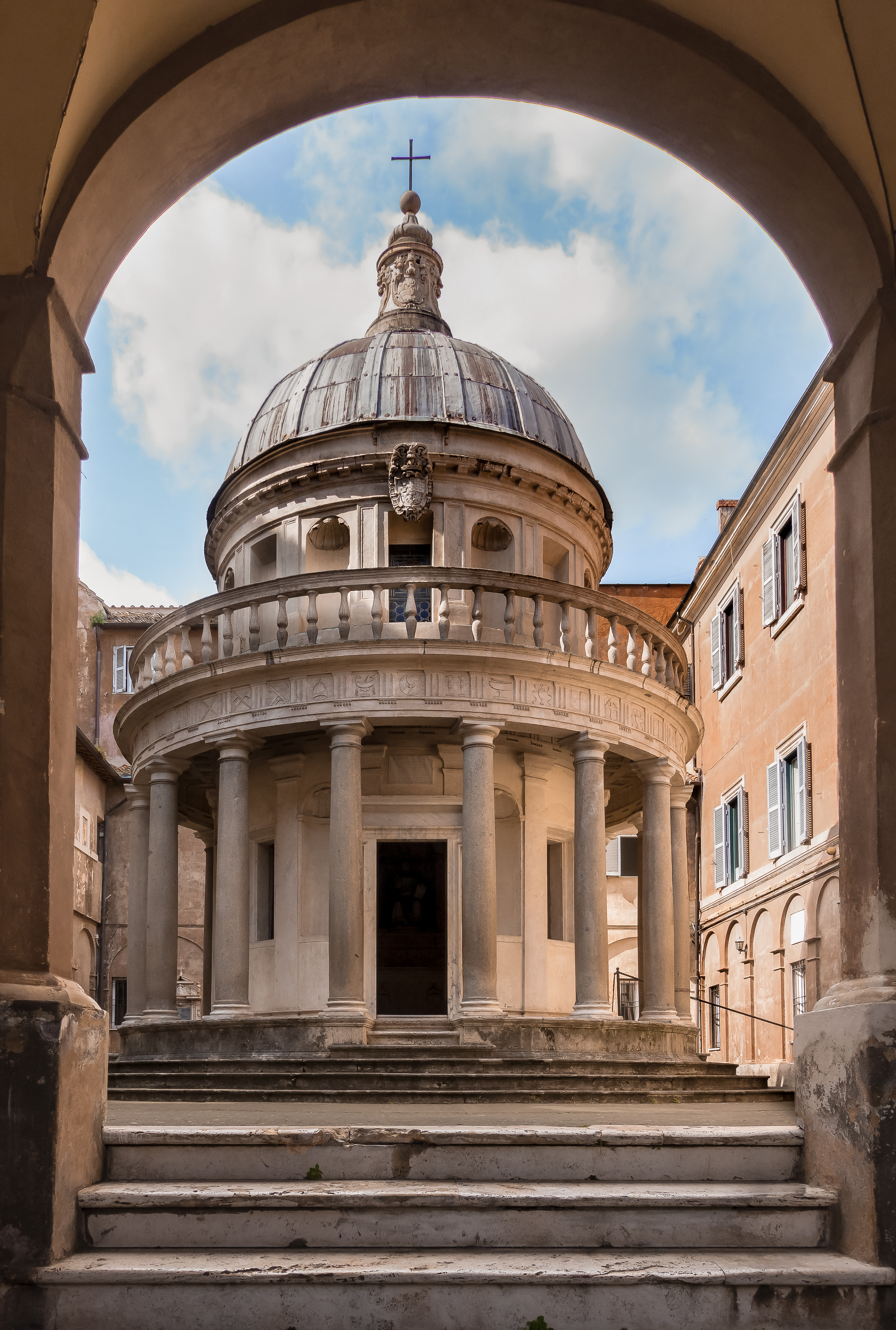
Tempietto del Bramante, San Pietro in Montorio, Rome, 1502, by Donato Bramante. This small temple marks the place where St. Peter was crucified.

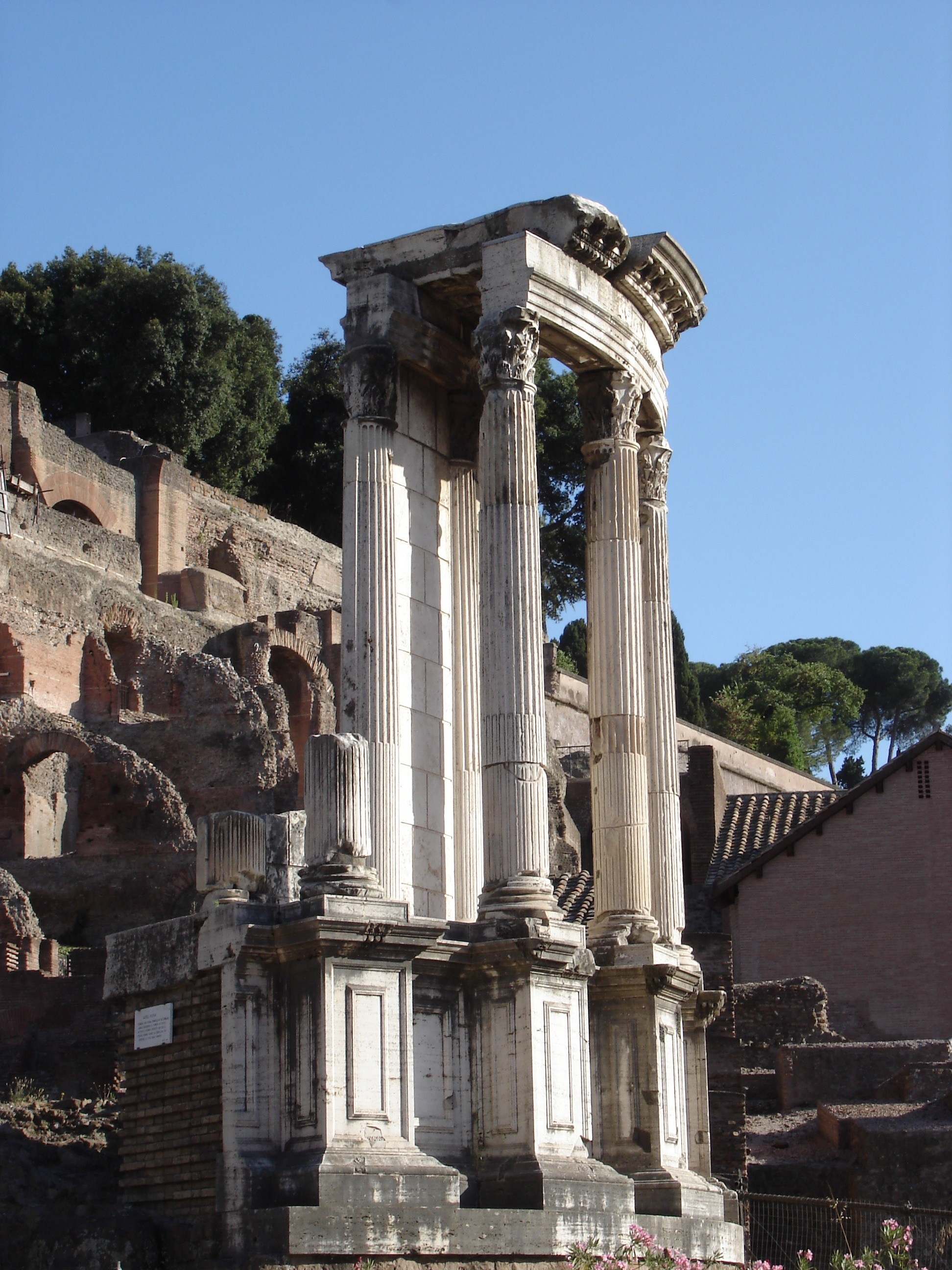
The Temple of Vesta in Rome was the model for Bramante's Tempietto.

Renaissance architecture is the European architecture of the period between the early 15th and early 16th centuries in different regions, demonstrating a conscious revival and development of certain elements of ancient Greek and Roman thought and material culture. Stylistically, Renaissance architecture followed Gothic architecture and was succeeded by Baroque architecture and neoclassical architecture.

Developed first in Florence, with Filippo Brunelleschi as one of its innovators, the Renaissance style quickly spread to other Italian cities. The style was carried to other parts of Europe at different dates and with varying degrees of impact. It began in Florence in the early 15th century and reflected a revival of classical Greek and Roman principles such as symmetry, proportion, and geometry. This movement was supported by wealthy patrons, including the Medici family and the Catholic Church, who commissioned works to display both religious devotion and political power. Architects such as Filippo Brunelleschi, Leon Battista Alberti, and later Andrea Palladio revolutionized urban landscapes with domes, columns, and harmonious facades. While Renaissance architecture flourished most in Italy, its influence spread across Europe reaching France, Spain, and the Low Countries adapting to local traditions. Public buildings, churches, and palaces became symbols of civic pride and imperial strength, linking humanism with empire-building.

Renaissance style places emphasis on symmetry, proportion, geometry and the regularity of parts, as demonstrated in the architecture of classical antiquity and in particular ancient Roman architecture, of which many examples remained. Orderly arrangements of columns, pilasters and lintels, as well as the use of semicircular arches, hemispherical domes, niches and aediculae replaced the more complex proportional systems and irregular profiles of medieval buildings.

== Historiography ==
The word "Renaissance" derives from the term rinascita, which means rebirth, first appeared in Giorgio Vasari's Lives of the Most Excellent Painters, Sculptors, and Architects, 1550.

Although the term Renaissance was used first by the French historian Jules Michelet, it was given its more lasting definition by the Swiss historian Jacob Burckhardt, whose book The Civilization of the Renaissance in Italy, 1860, was influential in the development of the modern interpretation of the Italian Renaissance. The folio of measured drawings Édifices de Rome moderne; ou, Recueil des palais, maisons, églises, couvents et autres monuments (The Buildings of Modern Rome), first published in 1840 by Paul Letarouilly, also played an important part in the revival of interest in this period. Erwin Panofsky, Renaissance and Renascences in Western Art, (New York: Harper and Row, 1960) The Renaissance style was recognized by contemporaries in the term "all'antica", or "in the ancient manner" (of the Romans).

=== Principal phases ===
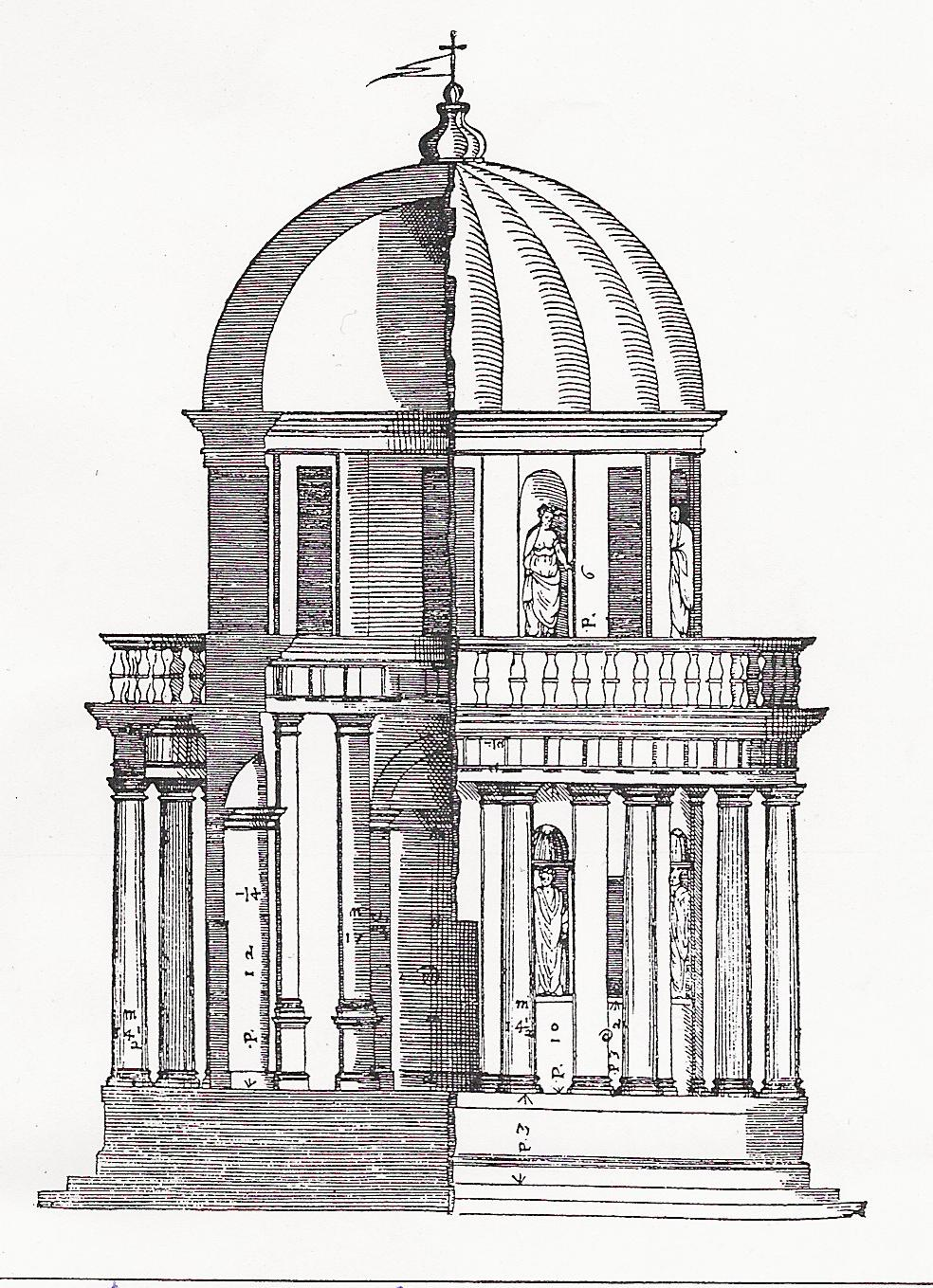
Palladio's engraving of Bramante's Tempietto

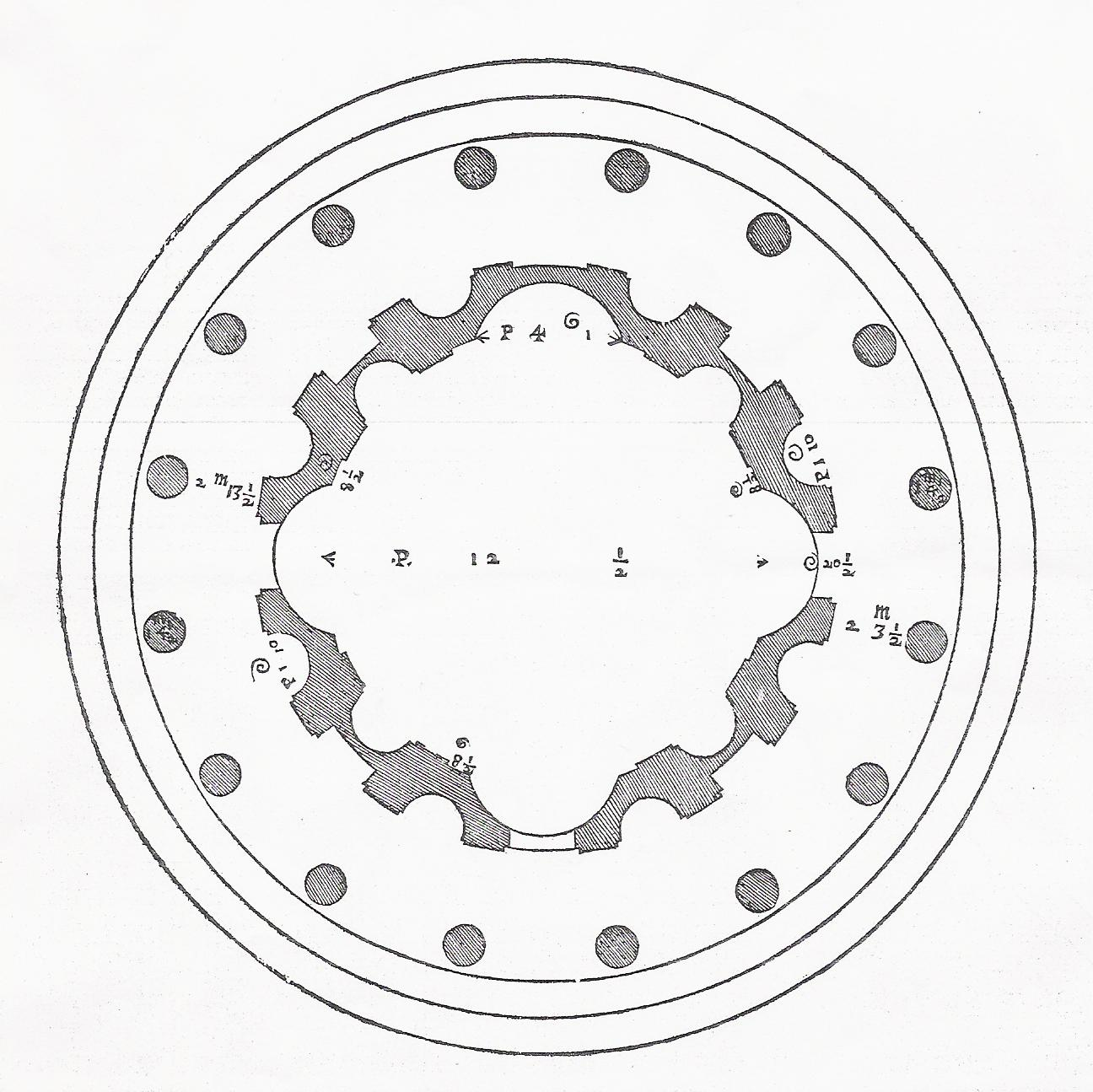
Plan of Bramante's Tempietto in Montorio

Historians often divide the Renaissance in Italy into three phases. (Note: Some architectural histories e.g. Sir Banister Fletcher, include Baroque as a phase of Renaissance architecture. Because of its extent, diversity and deviation from the Classical it is not included here and is the subject of a main article.) Whereas art historians might talk of an Early Renaissance period, in which they include developments in 14th-century painting and sculpture, this is usually not the case in architectural history. The bleak economic conditions of the late 14th century did not produce buildings that are considered to be part of the Renaissance. As a result, the word Renaissance among architectural historians usually applies to the period 1400 to c. 1525, or later in the case of non-Italian Renaissances.

Historians often use the following designations:

- Quattrocento (c. 1400–1500)

During the Quattrocento, (Note: The Italian translates literally to "fourteen-hundred" and coincides with the English "fifteenth century".) sometimes known as the Early Renaissance, (Note: The Early Renaissance in architecture is most applicable to developments in Venice, where there was a more fluid development between medieval and Renaissance styles than in Florence.) concepts of architectural order were explored and rules were formulated. The study of classical antiquity led in particular to the adoption of Classical detail and ornamentation. Space, as an element of architecture, was used differently than it was in the Middle Ages. Space was organised by proportional logic, its form and rhythm subject to geometry, rather than being created by intuition as in Medieval buildings. The prime example of this is the Basilica of San Lorenzo, Florence by Filippo Brunelleschi (1377–1446).

- High Renaissance (c. 1500–1525)

During the High Renaissance, concepts derived from classical antiquity were developed and used with greater confidence. The most representative architect is Donato Bramante (1444–1514), who expanded the applicability of classical architecture to contemporary buildings. His Tempietto di San Pietro in Montorio (1503) was directly inspired by circular Roman temples. He was, however, hardly a slave to the classical forms and it was his style that was to dominate Italian architecture in the 16th century.

- Mannerism (c. 1520–1600)

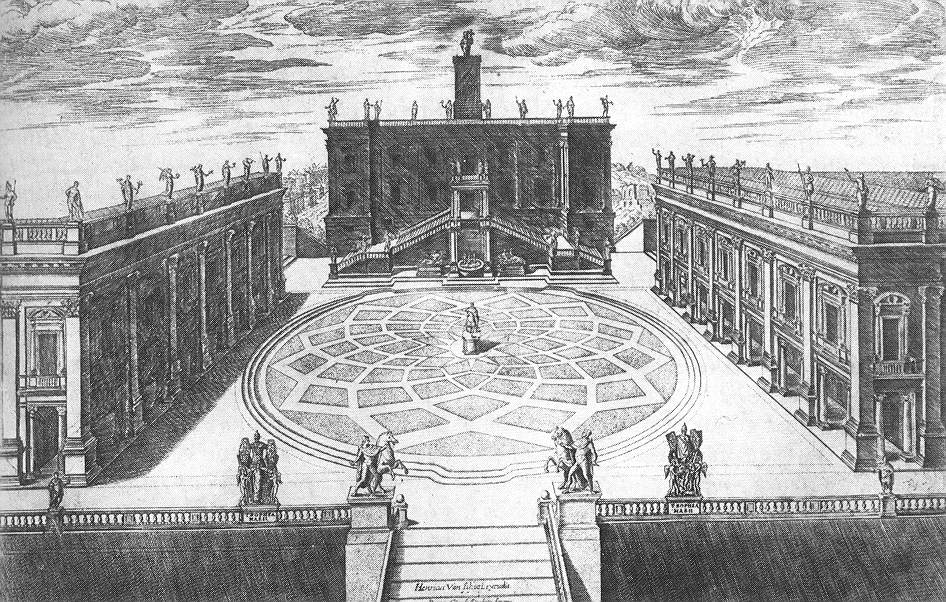
Piazza del Campidoglio, Rome

During the Mannerist period, architects experimented with using architectural forms to emphasize solid and spatial relationships. The Renaissance ideal of harmony gave way to freer and more imaginative rhythms. The best known architect associated with the Mannerist style was Michelangelo (1475–1564), who frequently used the giant order in his architecture, a large pilaster that stretches from the bottom to the top of a façade. He used this in his design for the Piazza del Campidoglio in Rome. Prior to the 20th century, the term Mannerism had negative connotations, but it is now used to describe the historical period in more general non-judgemental terms.

- From Renaissance to Baroque

As the new style of architecture spread out from Italy, most other European countries developed a sort of Proto-Renaissance style, before the construction of fully formulated Renaissance buildings. Each country in turn then grafted its own architectural traditions to the new style, so that Renaissance buildings across Europe are diversified by region. Within Italy the evolution of Renaissance architecture into Mannerism, with widely diverging tendencies in the work of Michelangelo, Giulio Romano and Andrea Palladio, led to the Baroque style in which the same architectural vocabulary was used for very different rhetoric. Outside Italy, Baroque architecture was more widespread and fully developed than the Renaissance style, with significant buildings as far afield as Mexico (Note: Cathedral of Chihuahua, 1725–1826) and the Philippines. (Note: Basilica Minore del Santo Niño, present structure 1735–39)

== History ==
=== Development in Italy ===
Italy of the 15th century, and the city of Florence in particular, was home to the Renaissance. It is in Florence that the new architectural style had its beginning, not slowly evolving in the way that Gothic grew out of Romanesque, but consciously brought to being by particular architects who sought to revive the order of a past "Golden Age". The scholarly approach to the architecture of the ancient coincided with the general revival of learning. A number of factors were influential in bringing this about.

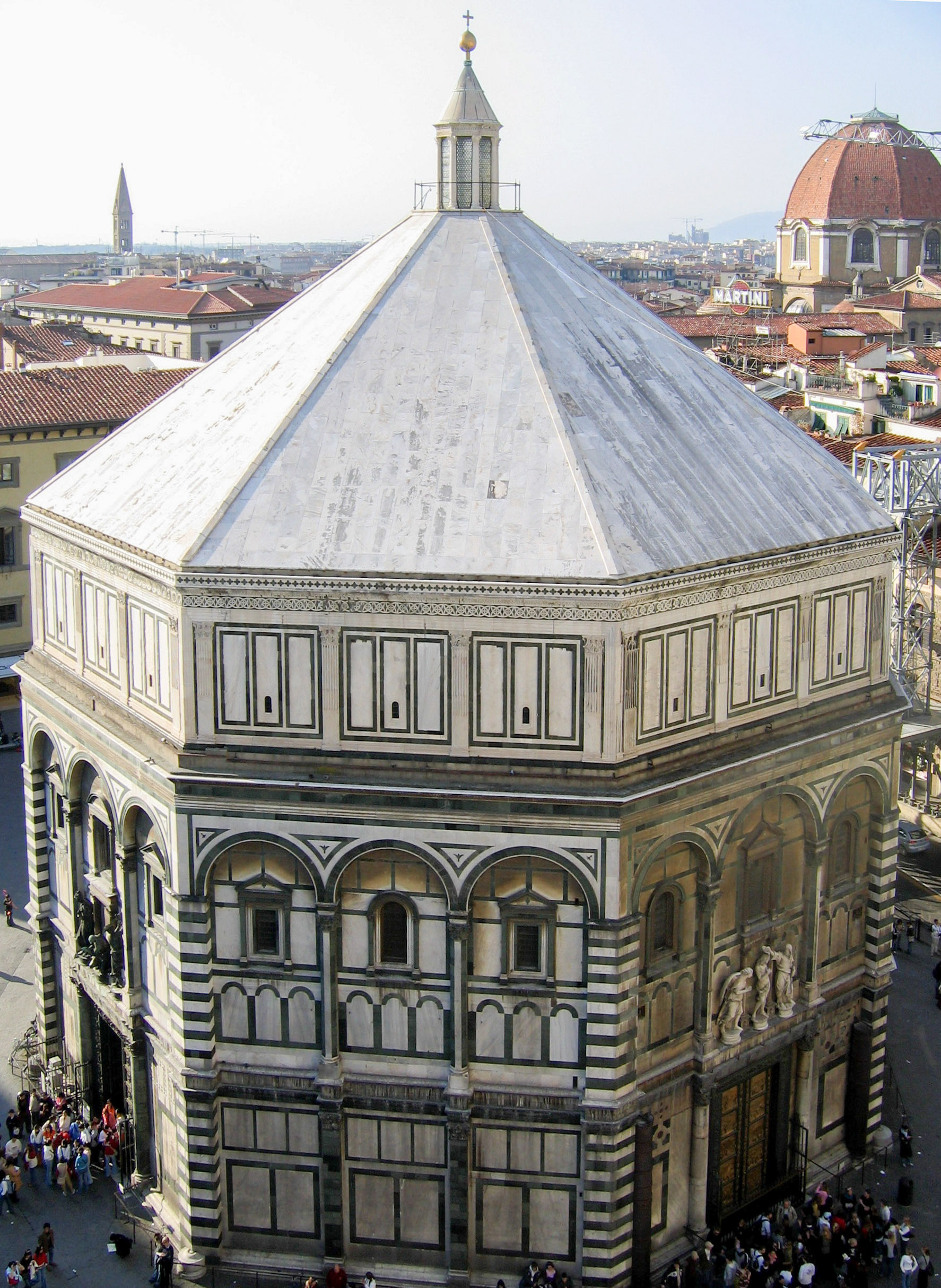
The Romanesque Florence Baptistery was the object of Brunelleschi's studies of perspective.

==== Architectural ====
Italian architects had always preferred forms that were clearly defined and structural members that expressed their purpose. Many Tuscan Romanesque buildings demonstrate these characteristics, as seen in the Florence Baptistery and Pisa Cathedral.

Italy had never fully adopted the Gothic style of architecture. Apart from Milan Cathedral, (influenced by French Rayonnant Gothic), few Italian churches show the emphasis on vertical, the clustered shafts, ornate tracery and complex ribbed vaulting that characterise Gothic in other parts of Europe.

The presence, particularly in Rome, of ancient architectural remains showing the ordered Classical style provided an inspiration to artists at a time when philosophy was also turning towards the Classical.

==== Political ====
In the 15th century, Florence and Venice extended their power through much of the area that surrounded them, making the movement of artists possible. This enabled Florence to have significant artistic influence in Milan, and through Milan, France.

In 1377, the return of the Pope from the Avignon Papacy and the re-establishment of the Papal court in Rome, brought wealth and importance to that city, as well as a renewal in the importance of the Pope in Italy, which was further strengthened by the Council of Constance in 1417. Successive Popes, especially Julius II, 1503–13, sought to extend the Papacy's temporal power throughout Italy.

==== Commercial ====
In the early Renaissance, Venice controlled sea trade over goods from the East. The large towns of Northern Italy were prosperous through trade with the rest of Europe, Genoa providing a seaport for the goods of France and Spain; Milan and Turin being centres of overland trade, and maintaining substantial metalworking industries. Trade brought wool from England to Florence, ideally located on the river for the production of fine cloth, the industry on which its wealth was founded. By dominating Pisa, Florence gained a seaport, and became the most powerful state in Tuscany. In this commercial climate, one family in particular turned their attention from trade to the lucrative business of money-lending. The Medici became the chief bankers to the princes of Europe, becoming virtually princes themselves as they did so, by reason of both wealth and influence. Along the trade routes, and thus offered some protection by commercial interest, moved not only goods but also artists, scientists and philosophers.

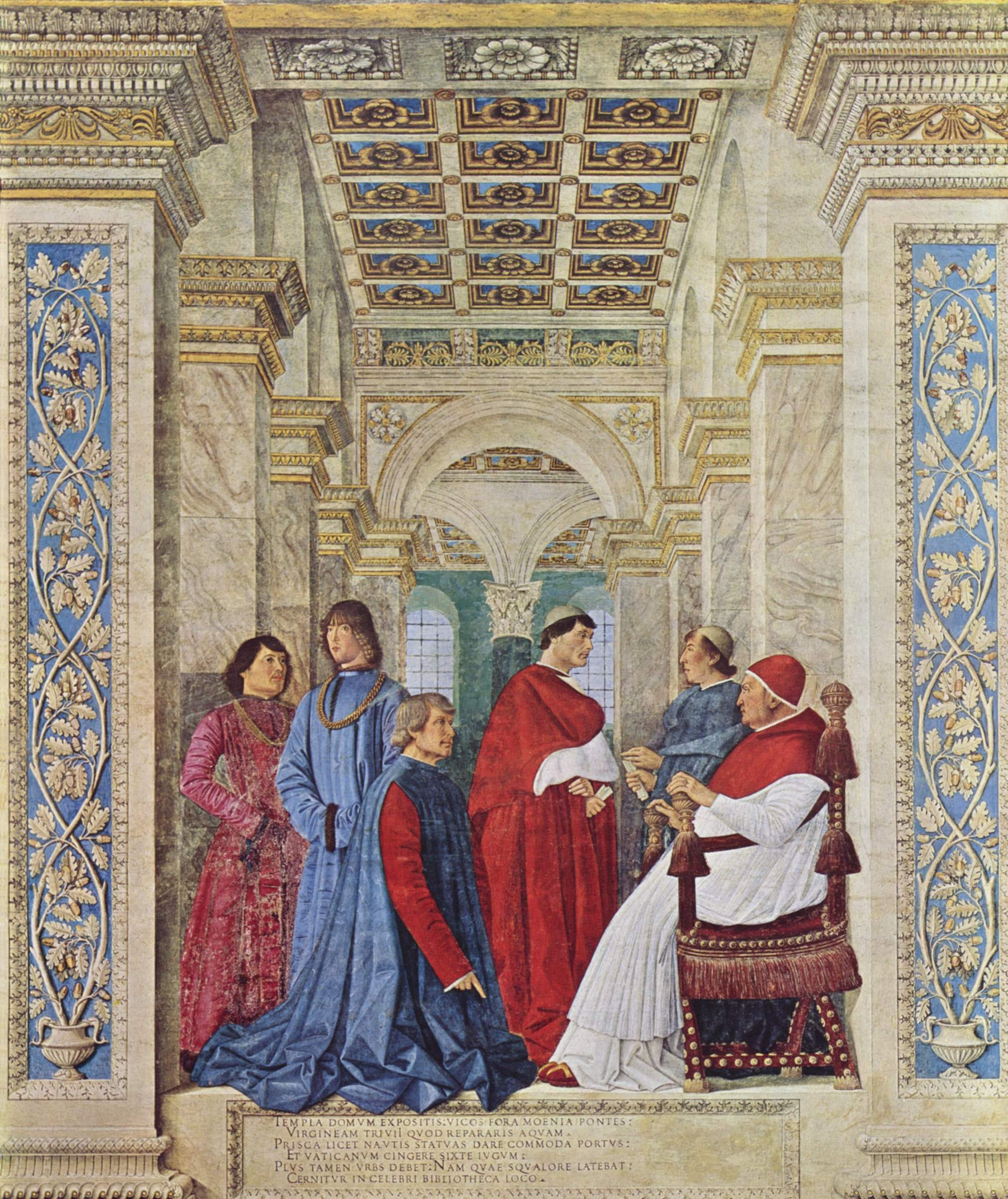
Pope Sixtus IV, 1477, builder of the Sistine Chapel. Fresco by Melozzo da Forlì in the Vatican Palace.

==== Religious ====
The return of the Pope Gregory XI from Avignon in September 1377 and the resultant new emphasis on Rome as the center of Christian spirituality, brought about a surge in the building of churches in Rome such as had not taken place for nearly a thousand years. This commenced in the mid 15th century and gained momentum in the 16th century, reaching its peak in the Baroque period. The construction of the Sistine Chapel with its uniquely important decorations and the entire rebuilding of St. Peter's Basilica, one of Christendom's most significant churches, were part of this process.

In the wealthy Republic of Florence, the impetus for church-building was more civic than spiritual. The unfinished state of the enormous Florence Cathedral dedicated to the Blessed Virgin Mary did no honour to the city under her patronage. However, as the technology and finance were found to complete it, the rising dome did credit not only to the Virgin Mary, its architect and the Church but also to the Signoria, the Guilds and the sectors of the city from which the manpower to construct it was drawn. The dome inspired further religious works in Florence.

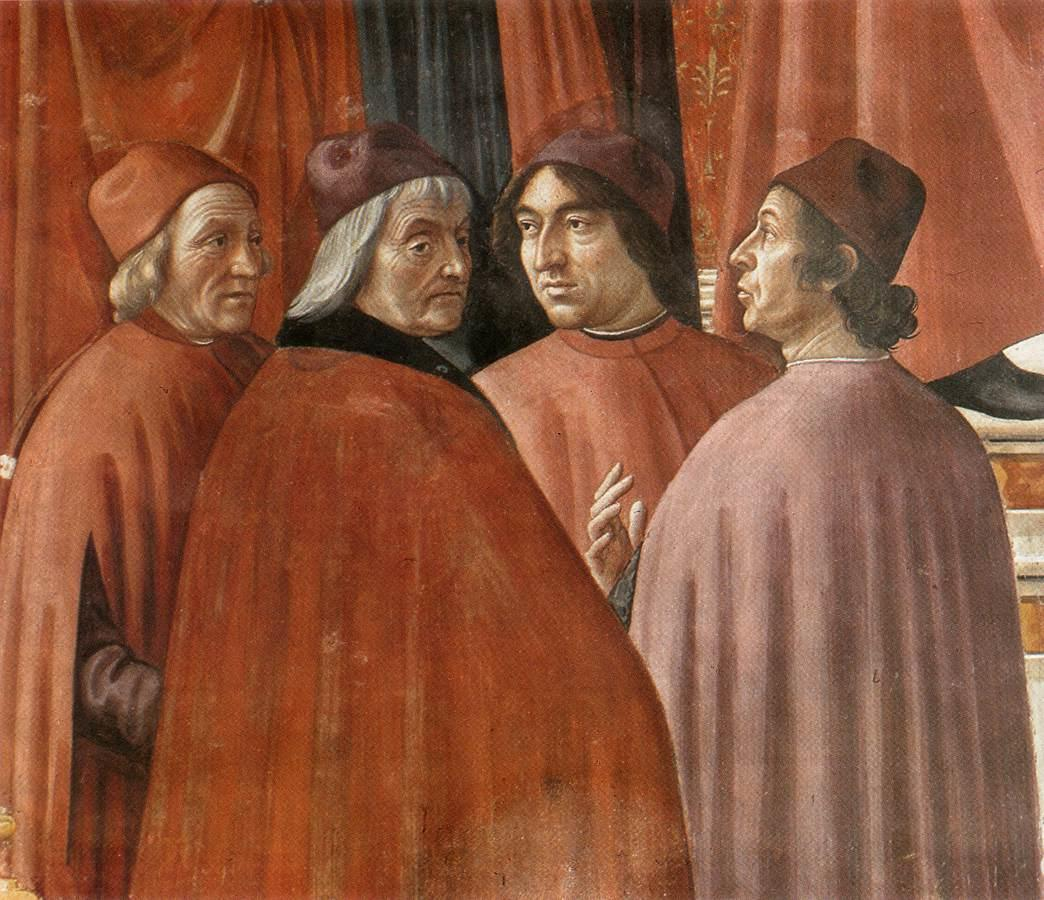
Four Humanist philosophers under the patronage of the Medici: Marsilio Ficino, Cristoforo Landino, Angelo Poliziano and Demetrius Chalcondyles. Fresco by Domenico Ghirlandaio.

==== Philosophic ====
The development of printed books, the rediscovery of ancient writings, the expanding of political and trade contacts and the exploration of the world all increased knowledge and the desire for education.

The reading of philosophies that were not based on Christian theology led to the development of humanism through which it was clear that while God had established and maintained order in the Universe, it was the role of Man to establish and maintain order in Society.

==== Civil ====
Through humanism, civic pride and the promotion of civil peace and order were seen as the marks of citizenship. This led to the building of structures such as Brunelleschi's Hospital of the Innocents with its elegant colonnade forming a link between the charitable building and the public square, and the Laurentian Library where the collection of books established by the Medici family could be consulted by scholars.

Some major ecclesiastical building works were also commissioned, not by the church, but by guilds representing the wealth and power of the city. Brunelleschi's dome at Florence Cathedral, more than any other building, belonged to the populace because the construction of each of the eight segments was achieved by a different quarter of the city.

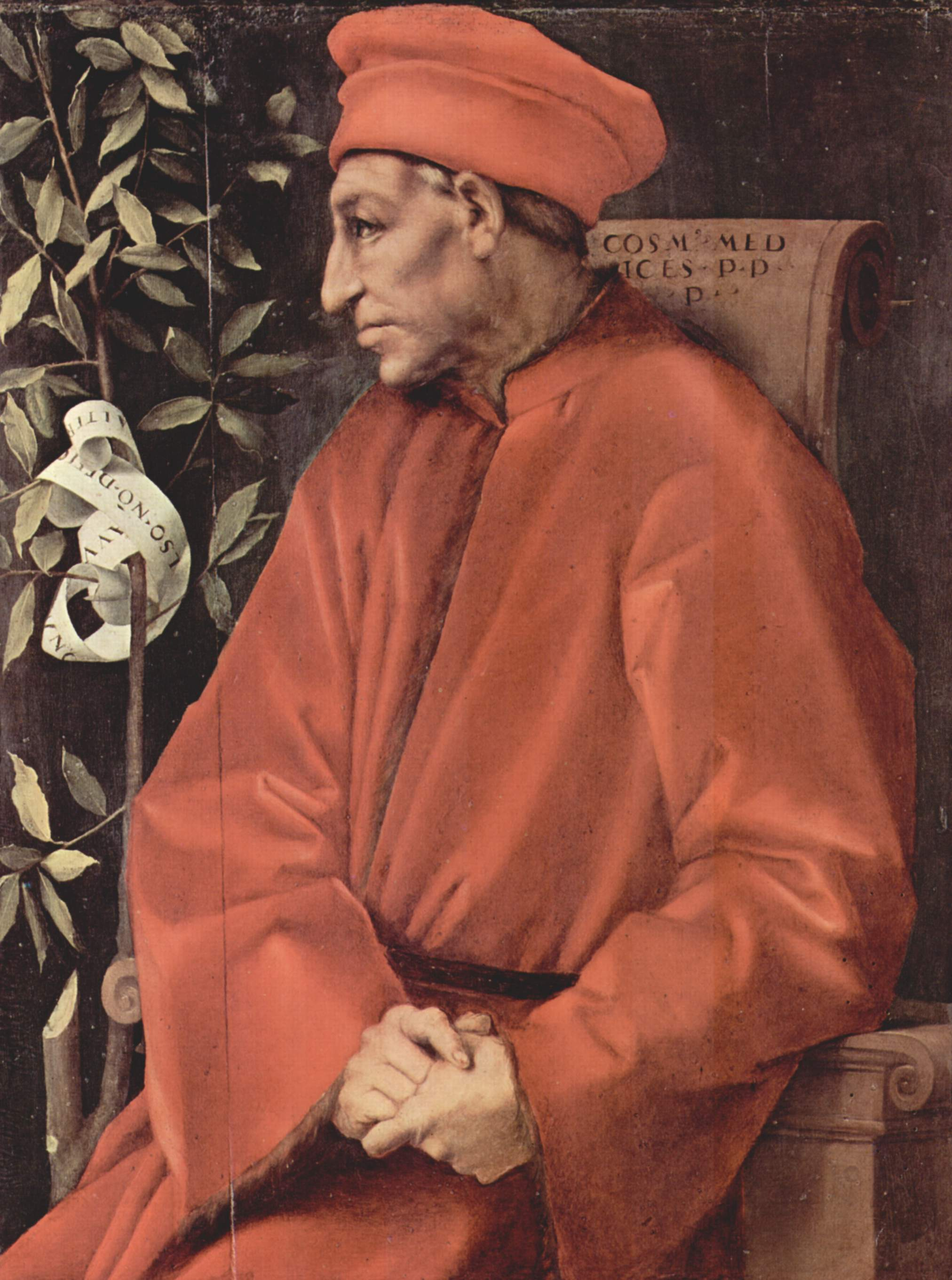
Cosimo de' Medici the Elder, head of the Medici Bank, sponsored civic building programs. Posthumous portrait by Pontormo.

==== Patronage ====
As in the Platonic Academy of Athens, it was seen by those of Humanist understanding that those people who had the benefit of wealth and education ought to promote the pursuit of learning and the creation of that which was beautiful. To this end, wealthy families—the Medici of Florence, the Gonzaga of Mantua, the Farnese in Rome, and the Sforzas in Milan—gathered around them people of learning and ability, promoting the skills and creating employment for the most talented artists and architects of their day.

=== Rise of architectural theory ===
During the Renaissance, architecture became not only a question of practice, but also a matter for theoretical discussion. Printing played a large role in the dissemination of ideas.

- The first treatise on architecture was De re aedificatoria ("On the Subject of Building") by Leon Battista Alberti in 1450. It was to some degree dependent on Vitruvius's De architectura, a manuscript of which was discovered in 1414 in a library in Switzerland. De re aedificatoria in 1485 became the first printed book on architecture.
- Sebastiano Serlio (1475 – c. 1554) produced the next important text, the first volume of which appeared in Venice in 1537; it was entitled Regole generali d'architettura ("General Rules of Architecture"). It is known as Serlio's "Fourth Book" since it was the fourth in Serlio's original plan of a treatise in seven books. In all, five books were published.
- In 1570, Andrea Palladio (1508–1580) published I quattro libri dell'architettura ("The Four Books of Architecture") in Venice. This book was widely printed and responsible to a great degree for spreading the ideas of the Renaissance through Europe. All these books were intended to be read and studied not only by architects, but also by patrons.

=== Spread of the Renaissance in Italy ===
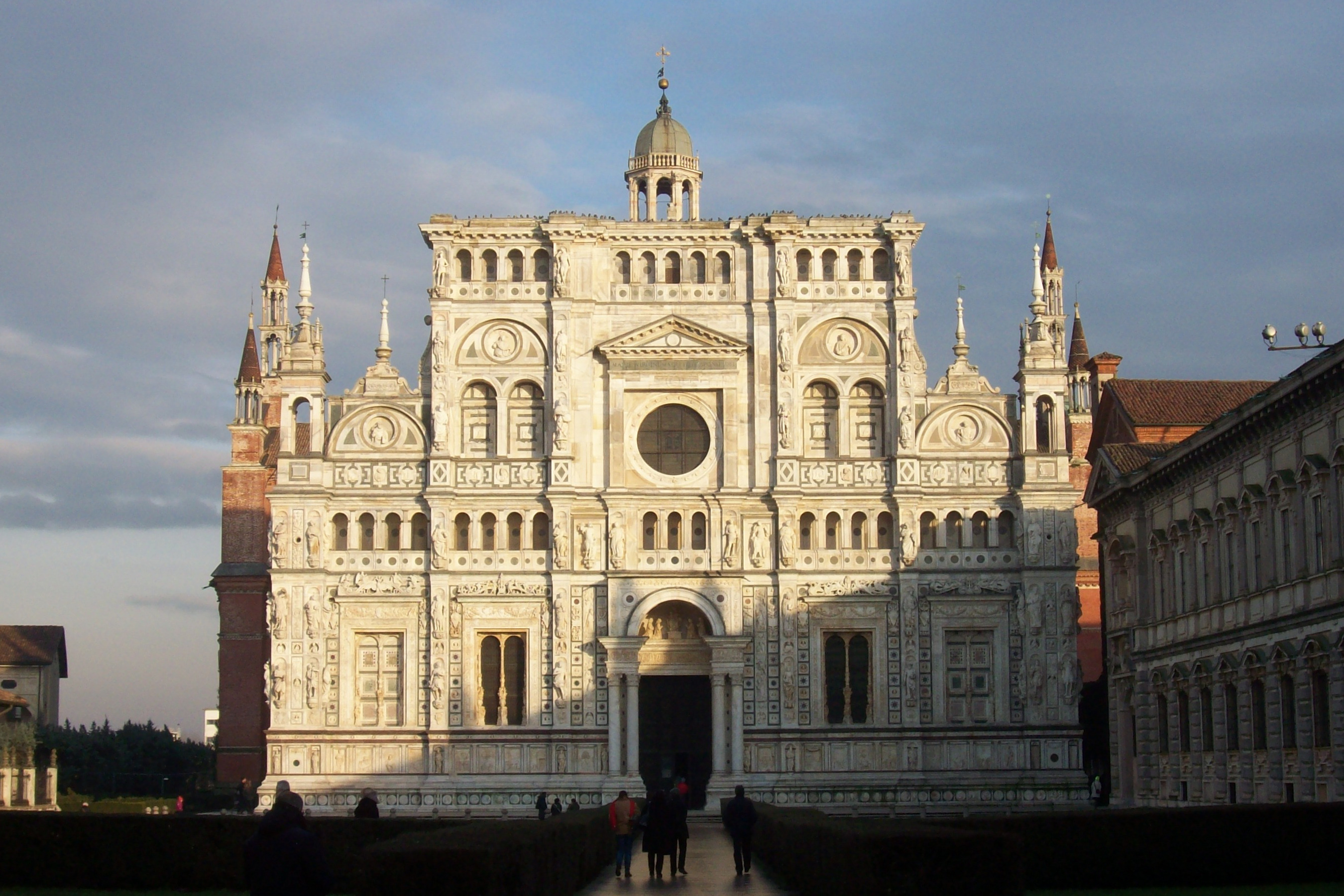
Church of the Certosa di Pavia, Lombardy

In the 15th century the courts of certain other Italian states became centres for spreading of Renaissance philosophy, art and architecture.

In Mantua at the court of the Gonzaga, Alberti designed two churches, the Basilica of Sant'Andrea and San Sebastiano.

Urbino was an important centre with the Ducal Palace being constructed for Federico da Montefeltro in the mid 15th century. The Duke employed Luciano Laurana from Dalmatia, renowned for his expertise at fortification. The design incorporates much of the earlier medieval building and includes an unusual turreted three-storeyed façade. Laurana was assisted by Francesco di Giorgio Martini. Later parts of the building are clearly Florentine in style, particularly the inner courtyard, but it is not known who the designer was.

Ferrara, under the Este, was expanded in the late 15th century, with several new palaces being built such as the Palazzo dei Diamanti and Palazzo Schifanoia for Borso d'Este.

In Milan, under the Visconti, the Certosa di Pavia was completed, and then later under the Sforza, the Castello Sforzesco was built.

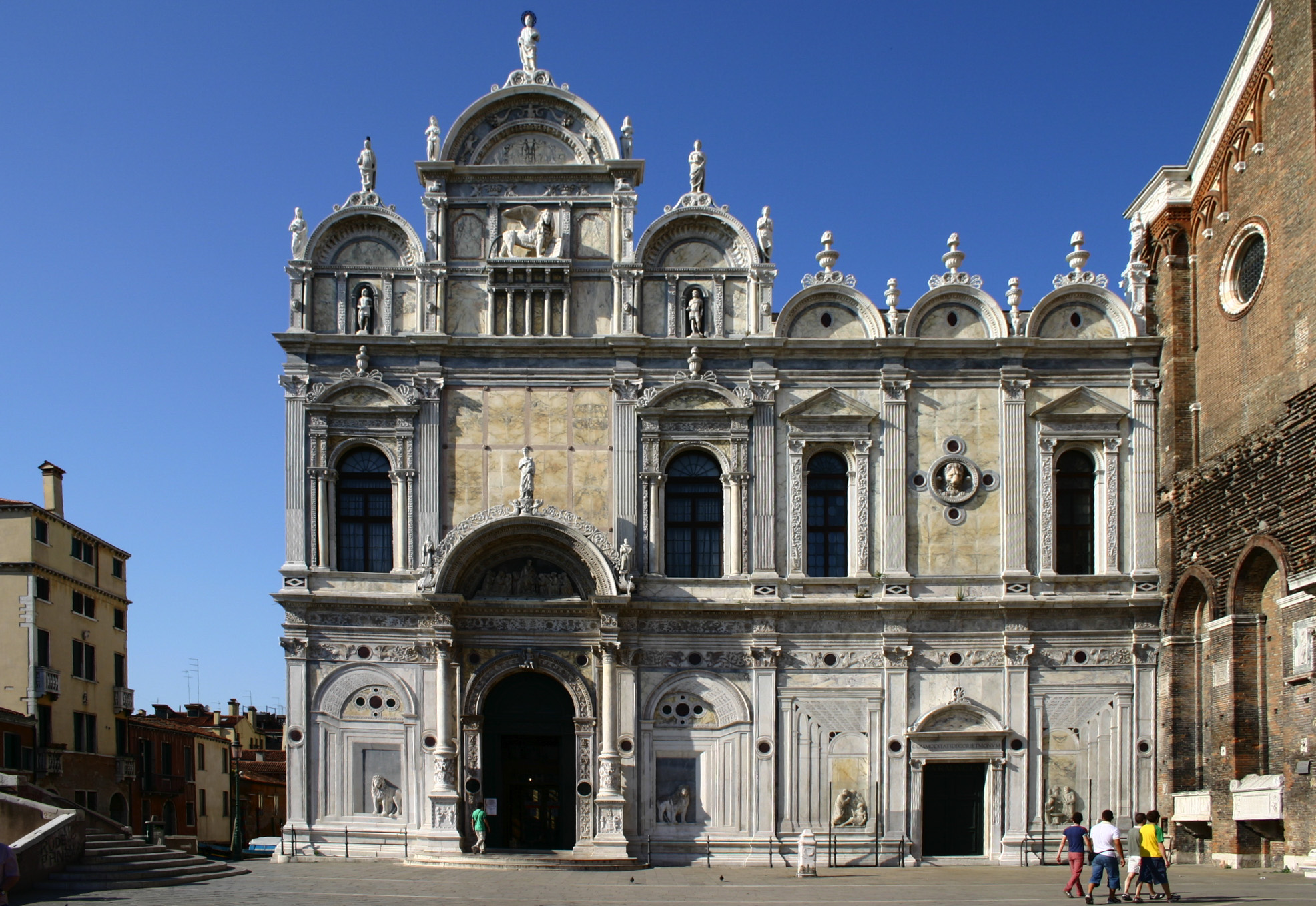
Scuola Grande di San Marco, Venice

Venetian Renaissance architecture developed a particularly distinctive character because of local conditions. San Zaccaria received its Renaissance façade at the hands of Antonio Gambello and Mauro Codussi, begun in the 1480s. Giovanni Maria Falconetto, the Veronese architect-sculptor, introduced Renaissance architecture to Padua with the Loggia and Odeo Cornaro in the garden of Alvise Cornaro.

In southern Italy, Renaissance masters were called to Naples by Alfonso V of Aragon after his conquest of the Kingdom of Naples. The most notable examples of Renaissance architecture in that city are the Cappella Caracciolo, attributed to Bramante, and the Palazzo Orsini di Gravina, built by Gabriele d'Angelo between 1513 and 1549.

== Characteristics ==
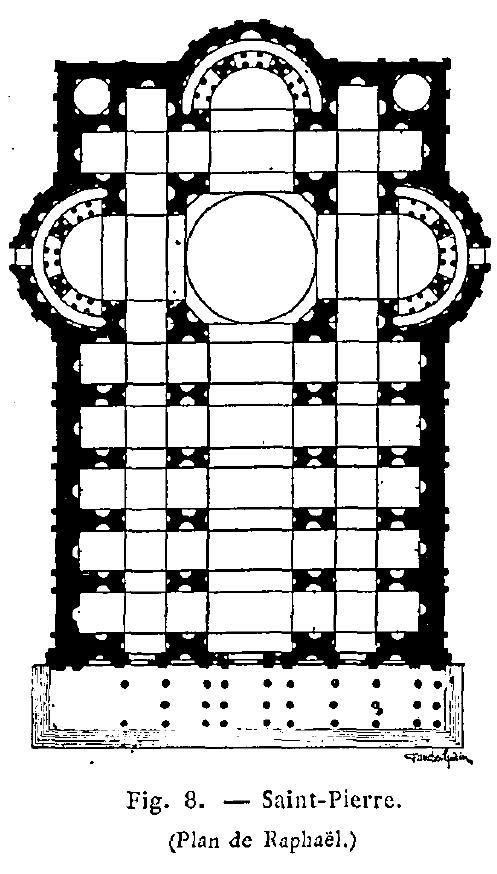
Raphael's unused plan for St. Peter's Basilica

The Classical orders were analysed and reconstructed to serve new purposes. (Note: The list of characteristics below is expanded from a list based on Banister Fletcher. See below.) While the obvious distinguishing features of Classical Roman architecture were adopted by Renaissance architects, the forms and purposes of buildings had changed over time, as had the structure of cities. Among the earliest buildings of the reborn Classicism were the type of churches that the Romans had never constructed. Neither were there models for the type of large city dwellings required by wealthy merchants of the 15th century. Conversely, there was no call for enormous sporting fixtures and public bath houses such as the Romans had built.

=== Plan ===
The plans of Renaissance buildings have a square, symmetrical appearance in which proportions are usually based on a module. Within a church, the module is often the width of an aisle. The need to integrate the design of the plan with the façade was introduced as an issue in the work of Filippo Brunelleschi, but he was never able to carry this aspect of his work into fruition. The first building to demonstrate this was Basilica of Sant'Andrea, Mantua by Leone Battista Alberti. The development of the plan in secular architecture was to take place in the 16th century and culminated with the work of Palladio.

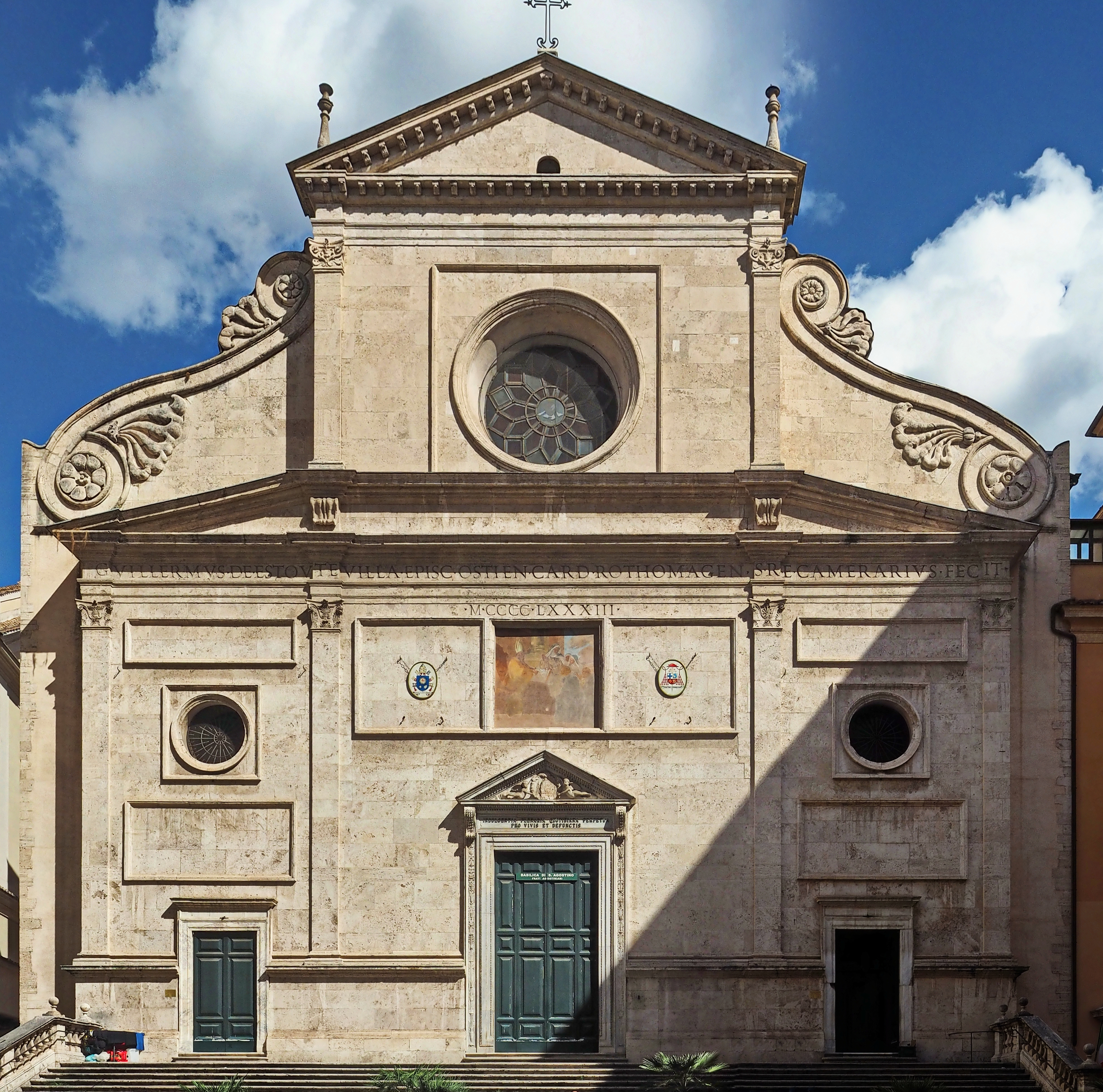
Façade of Sant'Agostino, Rome, built in 1483 by Giacomo di Pietrasanta

=== Façade ===
Façades are symmetrical around their vertical axis. Church façades are generally surmounted by a pediment and organised by a system of pilasters, arches and entablatures. The columns and windows show a progression towards the centre. One of the first true Renaissance façades was Pienza Cathedral (1459–1462), which has been attributed to the Florentine architect Bernardo Gambarelli (known as Rossellino) with Leone Battista Alberti perhaps having some responsibility in its design as well.

Domestic buildings are often surmounted by a cornice. There is a regular repetition of openings on each floor, and the centrally placed door is marked by a feature such as a balcony, or rusticated surround. An early and much copied prototype was the façade for the Palazzo Rucellai (1446 and 1451) in Florence with its three registers of pilasters.

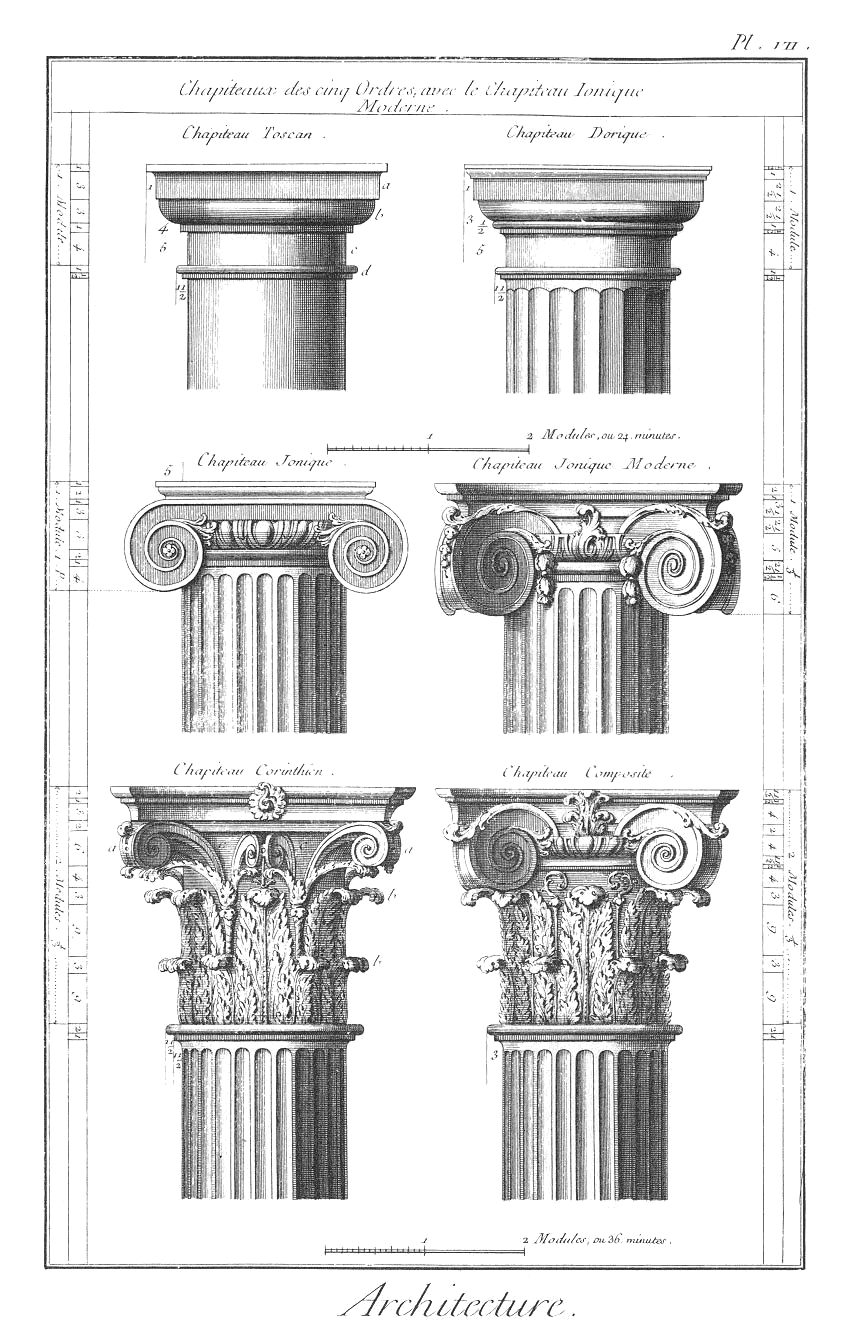
Classical Orders, engraving from the Encyclopédie vol. 18. 18th century.

=== Columns and pilasters ===
Roman and Greek orders of columns are used: Tuscan, Doric, Ionic, Corinthian and Composite. The orders can either be structural, supporting an arcade or architrave, or purely decorative, set against a wall in the form of pilasters. During the Renaissance, architects aimed to use columns, pilasters, and entablatures as an integrated system. One of the first buildings to use pilasters as an integrated system was in the Old Sacristy (1421–1440) by Brunelleschi.

=== Arches ===
Arches are semi-circular or (in the Mannerist style) segmental. Arches are often used in arcades, supported on piers or columns with capitals. There may be a section of entablature between the capital and the springing of the arch. Alberti was one of the first to use the arch on a monumental scale at the Basilica of Sant'Andrea, Mantua.

=== Vaults ===
Vaults do not have ribs. They are semi-circular or segmental and on a square plan, unlike the Gothic vault which is frequently rectangular. The barrel vault is returned to architectural vocabulary as at St. Andrea in Mantua.

=== Domes ===
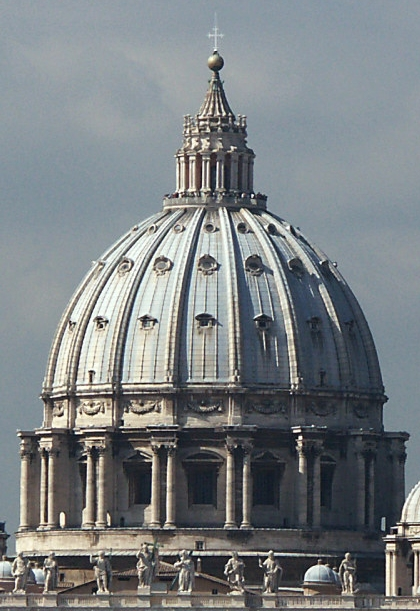
Dome of St Peter's Basilica, Rome

The dome is used frequently, both as a very large structural feature that is visible from the exterior, and also as a means of roofing smaller spaces where they are only visible internally. After the success of the dome in Brunelleschi's design for Florence Cathedral and its use in Bramante's plan for St. Peter's Basilica (1506) in Rome, the dome became an indispensable element in church architecture and later even for secular architecture, such as Palladio's Villa Rotonda. (Note: A major use of this feature is great dome of the US Capitol Building (begun 1856) in Washington, D.C. and all the subsequent State Capitals buildings in the Renaissance Revival style.)

=== Ceilings ===
Roofs are fitted with flat or coffered ceilings. They are not left open as in Medieval architecture. They are frequently painted or decorated.

=== Doors ===
Doors usually have square lintels. They may be set within an arch or surmounted by a triangular or segmental pediment. Openings that do not have doors are usually arched and frequently have a large or decorative keystone.

=== Windows ===
Windows may be paired and set within a semi-circular arch. They may have square lintels and triangular or segmental pediments, which are often used alternately. Emblematic in this respect is the Palazzo Farnese in Rome, begun in 1517.

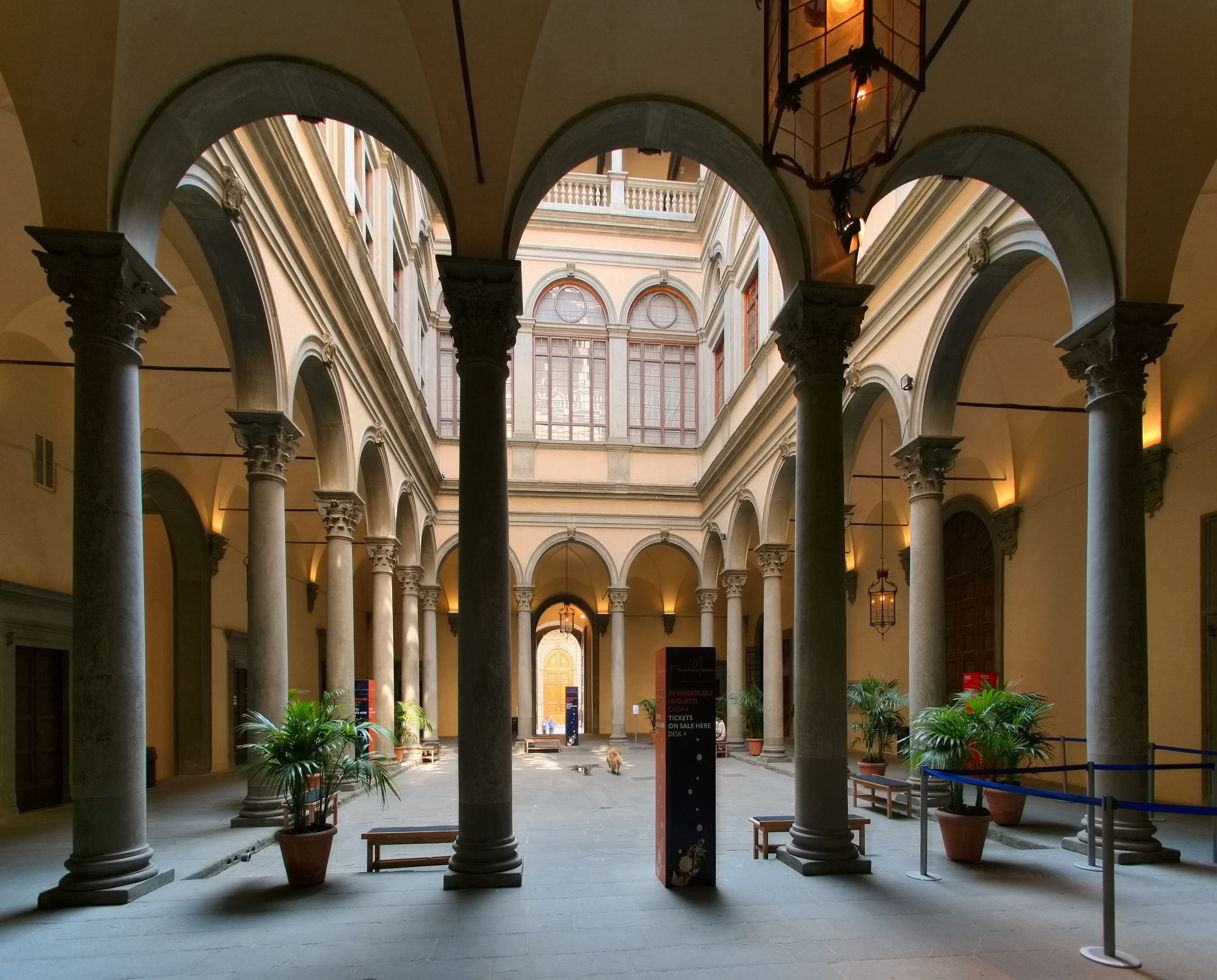
Courtyard of Palazzo Strozzi, Florence

In the Mannerist period the Palladian arch was employed, using a motif of a high semi-circular topped opening flanked with two lower square-topped openings. Windows are used to bring light into the building and in domestic architecture, to give views. Stained glass, although sometimes present, is not a feature.

=== Walls ===
External walls are generally constructed of brick, rendered, or faced with stone in highly finished ashlar masonry, laid in straight courses. The corners of buildings are often emphasized by rusticated quoins. Basements and ground floors were often rusticated, as at the Palazzo Medici Riccardi (1444–1460) in Florence. Internal walls are smoothly plastered and surfaced with lime wash. For more formal spaces, internal surfaces are decorated with frescoes.

=== Details ===
Courses, mouldings and all decorative details are carved with great precision. Studying and mastering the details of the ancient Romans was one of the important aspects of Renaissance theory. The different orders each required different sets of details. Some architects were stricter in their use of classical details than others, but there was also a good deal of innovation in solving problems, especially at corners. Mouldings stand out around doors and windows rather than being recessed, as in Gothic architecture. Sculptured figures may be set in niches or placed on plinths. They are not integral to the building as in Medieval architecture.

== Early Renaissance ==
The leading architects of the Early Renaissance or Quattrocento were Filippo Brunelleschi, Michelozzo and Leon Battista Alberti.

=== Brunelleschi ===
The person generally credited with bringing about the Renaissance view of architecture is Filippo Brunelleschi, (1377–1446). The underlying feature of the work of Brunelleschi was "order".

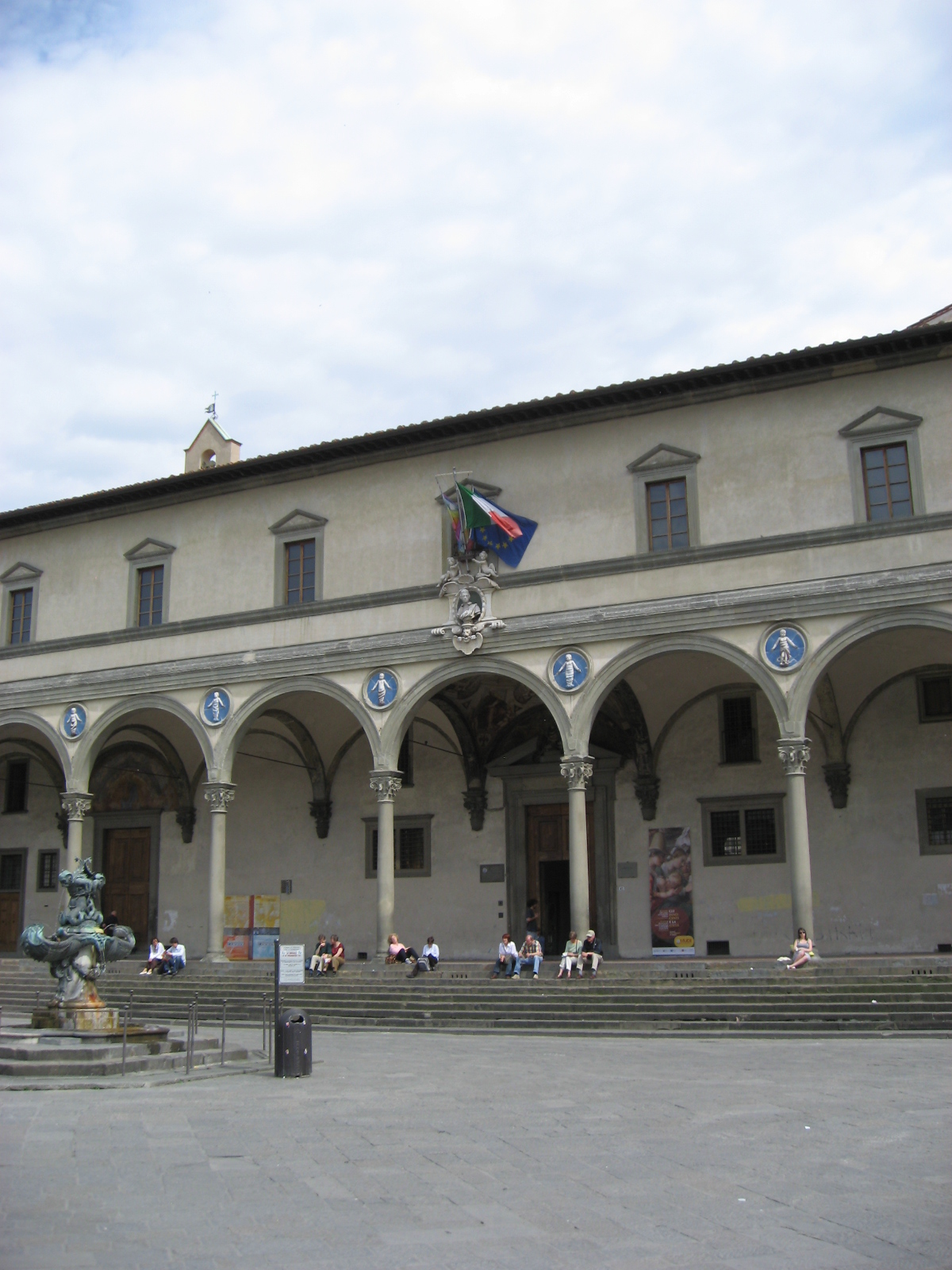
Ospedale degli Innocenti, Florence

In the early 15th century, Brunelleschi began to look at the world to see what the rules were that governed one's way of seeing. He observed that the way one sees regular structures such as the Florence Baptistery and the tiled pavement surrounding it follows a mathematical order – linear perspective.

The buildings remaining among the ruins of ancient Rome appeared to respect a simple mathematical order in the way that Gothic buildings did not. One incontrovertible rule governed all Ancient Roman architecture – a semi-circular arch is exactly twice as wide as it is high. A fixed proportion with implications of such magnitude occurred nowhere in Gothic architecture. A Gothic pointed arch could be extended upwards or flattened to any proportion that suited the location. Arches of differing angles frequently occurred within the same structure. No set rules of proportion applied.

From the observation of the architecture of Rome came a desire for symmetry and careful proportion in which the form and composition of the building as a whole and all its subsidiary details have fixed relationships, each section in proportion to the next, and the architectural features serving to define exactly what those rules of proportion are. Brunelleschi gained the support of a number of wealthy Florentine patrons, including the Silk Guild and Cosimo de' Medici.

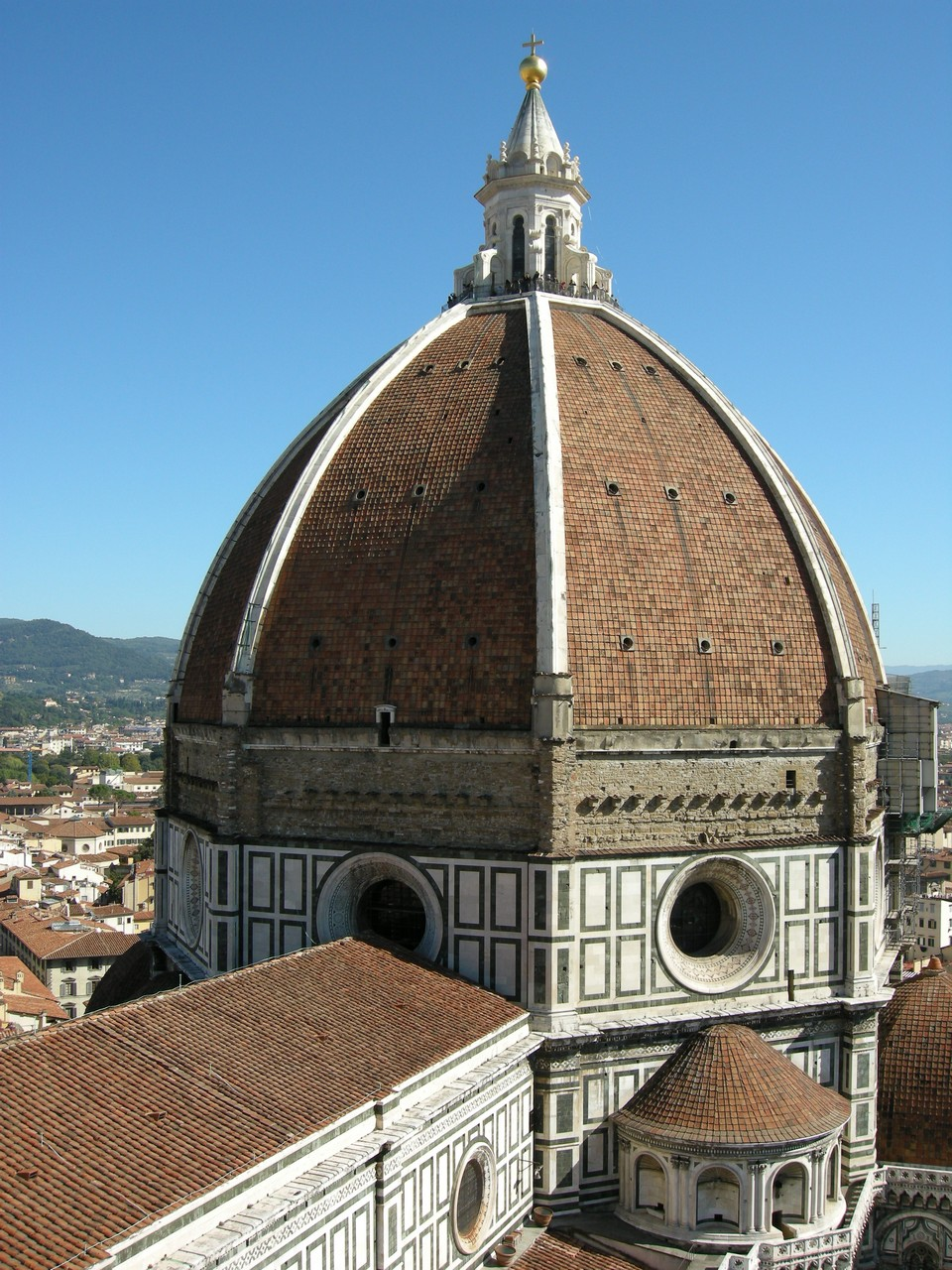
Dome of Florence Cathedral

==== Florence Cathedral ====
Brunelleschi's first major architectural commission was for the enormous brick dome which covers the central space of Florence's cathedral, designed by Arnolfo di Cambio in the 14th century but left unroofed. While often described as the first building of the Renaissance, Brunelleschi's daring design utilises the pointed Gothic arch and Gothic ribs that were apparently planned by Arnolfo. It seems certain, however, that while stylistically Gothic, in keeping with the building it surmounts, the dome is in fact structurally influenced by the great dome of Ancient Rome, which Brunelleschi could hardly have ignored in seeking a solution. This is the dome of the Pantheon, a circular temple, now a church.

Inside the Pantheon's single-shell concrete dome is coffering which greatly decreases the weight. The vertical partitions of the coffering effectively serve as ribs, although this feature does not dominate visually. At the apex of the Pantheon's dome is an opening, 8 meters across. Brunelleschi was aware that a dome of enormous proportion could in fact be engineered without a keystone. The dome in Florence is supported by the eight large ribs and sixteen more internal ones holding a brick shell, with the bricks arranged in a herringbone manner. Although the techniques employed are different, in practice, both domes comprise a thick network of ribs supporting very much lighter and thinner infilling. And both have a large opening at the top.

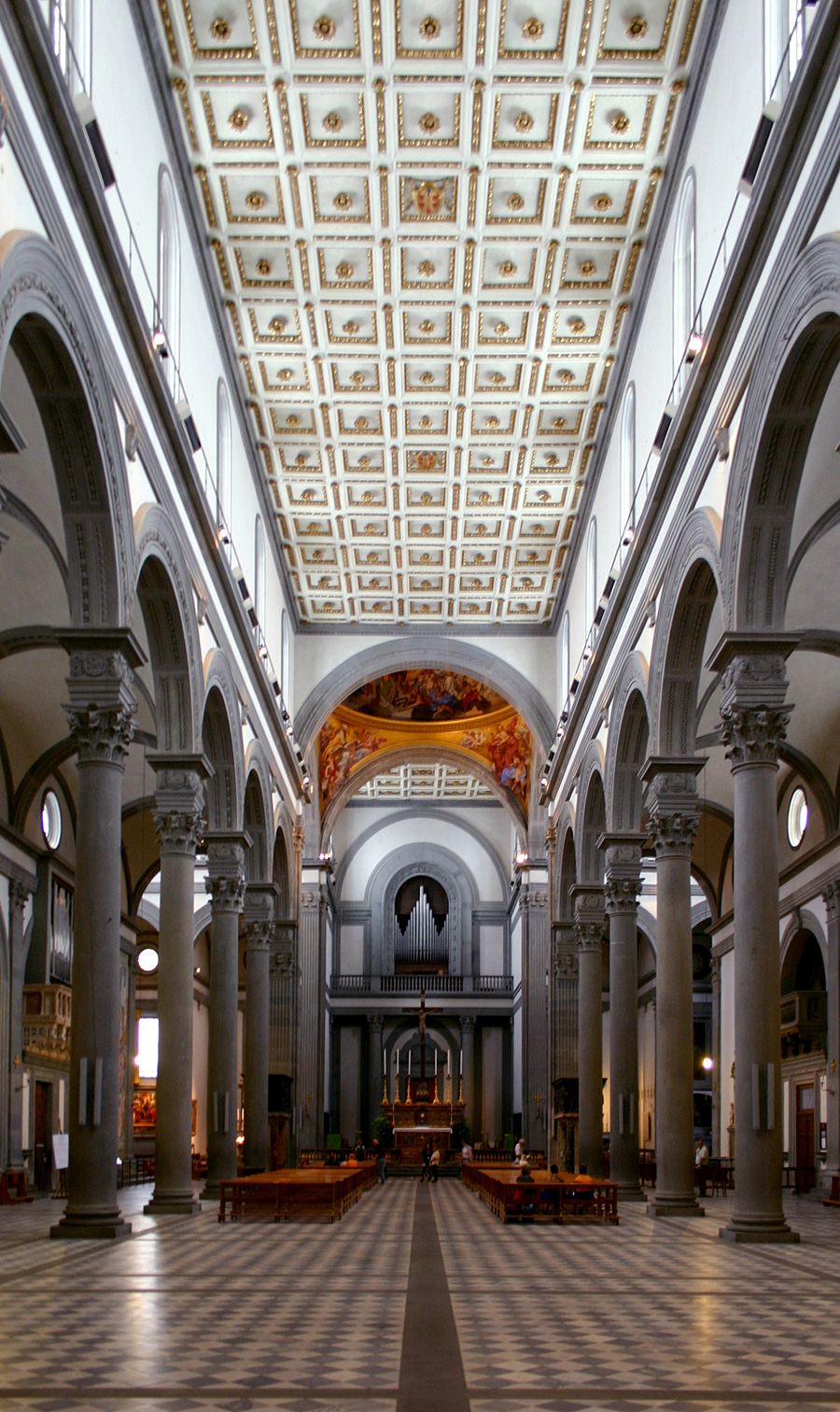
Church of San Lorenzo, Florence

==== San Lorenzo ====
The new architectural philosophy of the Renaissance is best demonstrated in the churches of San Lorenzo, and Santo Spirito, Florence. Designed by Brunelleschi in about 1425 and 1428 respectively, both have the shape of the Latin cross. Each has a modular plan, each portion being a multiple of the square bay of the aisle. This same formula controlled also the vertical dimensions. In the case of Santo Spirito, which is entirely regular in plan, transepts and chancel are identical, while the nave is an extended version of these. In 1434 Brunelleschi designed the first Renaissance centrally planned building, Santa Maria degli Angeli, Florence. It is composed of a central octagon surrounded by a circuit of eight smaller chapels. From this date onwards numerous churches were built in variations of these designs.

=== Michelozzo ===
Michelozzo Michelozzi (1396–1472), was another architect under patronage of the Medici family, his most famous work being the Palazzo Medici Riccardi, which he was commissioned to design for Cosimo de' Medici in 1444. A decade later he built the Villa Medici, Fiesole. Among his other works for Cosimo are the library at the Convent of San Marco, Florence. He went into exile in Venice for a time with his patron. He was one of the first architects to work in the Renaissance style outside Italy, building a palace at Dubrovnik.

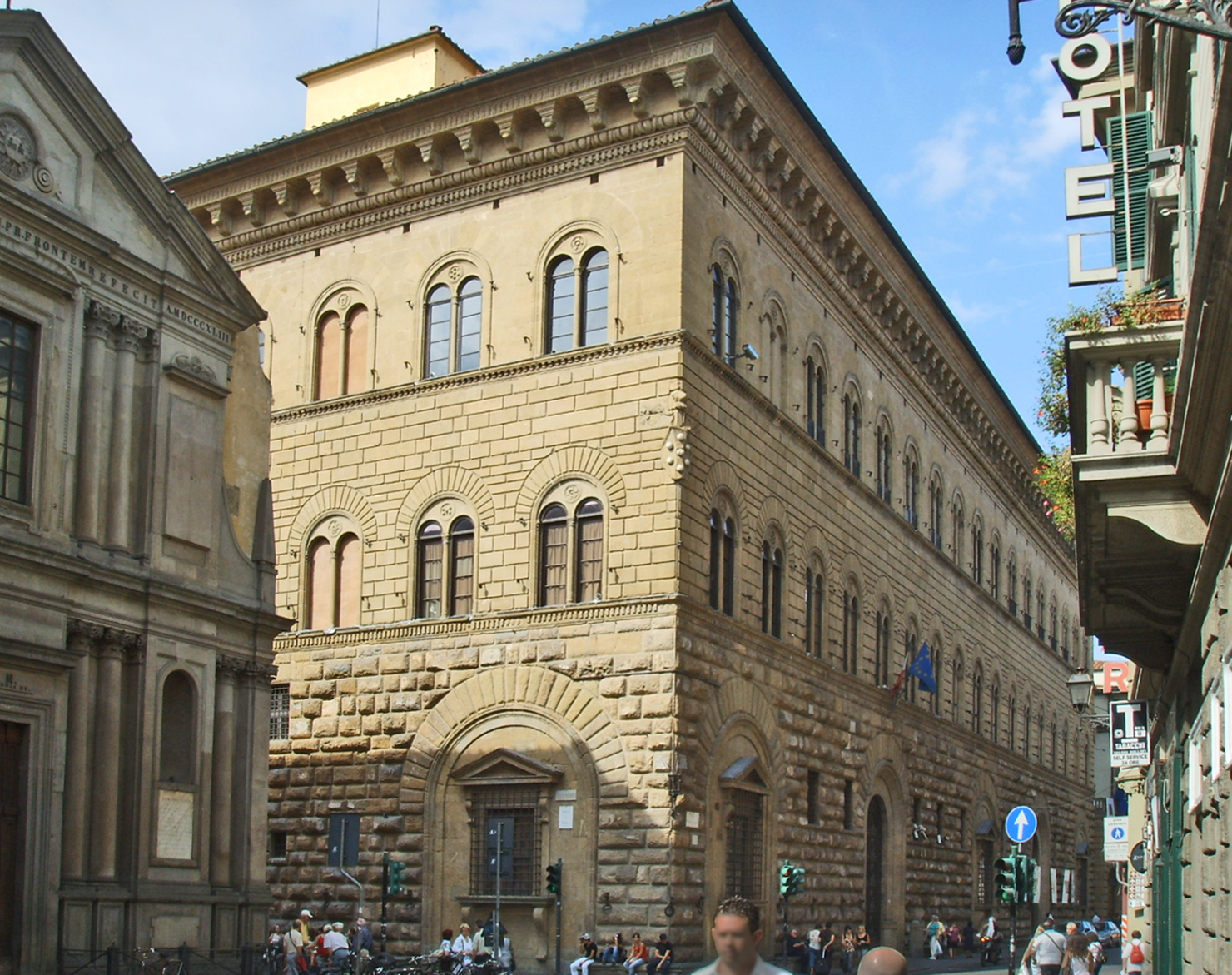
Palazzo Medici Riccardi by Michelozzo. Florence, 1444

The Palazzo Medici Riccardi is Classical in the details of its pedimented windows and recessed doors, but, unlike the works of Brunelleschi and Alberti, there are no classical orders of columns in evidence. Instead, Michelozzo has respected the Florentine liking for rusticated stone. He has seemingly created three orders out of the three defined rusticated levels, the whole being surmounted by an enormous Roman-style cornice which juts out over the street by 2.5 meters.

=== Alberti ===
Leon Battista Alberti, born in Genoa (1402–1472), was an important Humanist theoretician and designer whose book on architecture De re Aedificatoria was to have lasting effect. An aspect of Renaissance humanism was an emphasis of the anatomy of nature, in particular the human form, a science first studied by the Ancient Greeks. Humanism made man the measure of things. Alberti perceived the architect as a person with great social responsibilities.

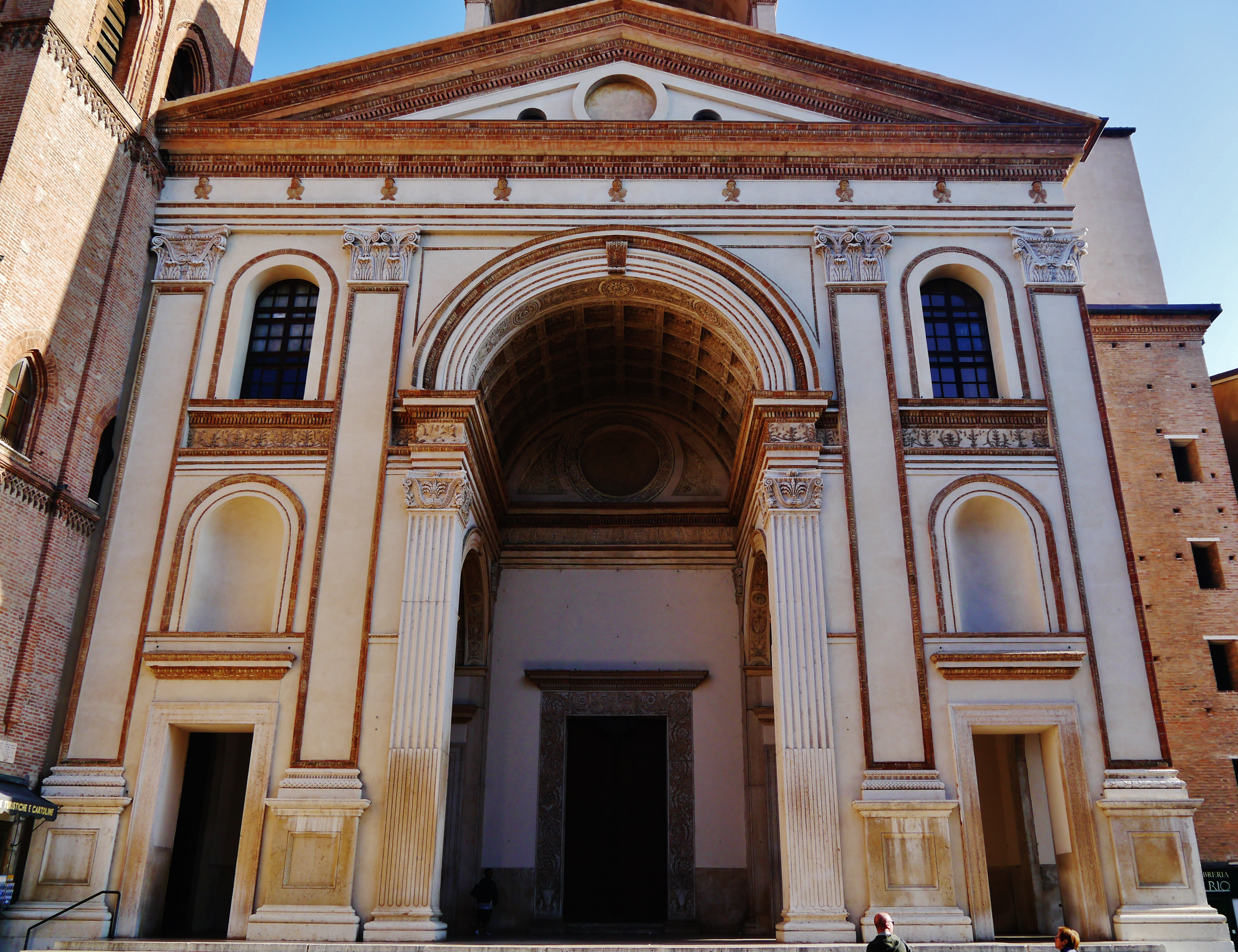
Façade of the Basilica of Sant'Andrea, Mantua

He designed a number of buildings, but unlike Brunelleschi, he did not see himself as a builder in a practical sense and so left the supervision of the work to others. Miraculously, one of his greatest designs, that of the Basilica of Sant'Andrea, Mantua, was brought to completion with its character essentially intact. Not so the Church of San Francesco in Rimini, a rebuilding of a Gothic structure, which, like Sant'Andrea, was to have a façade reminiscent of a Roman triumphal arch. This was left sadly incomplete.

Sant'Andrea is an extremely dynamic building both without and within. Its triumphal façade is marked by extreme contrasts. The projection of the order of pilasters that define the architectural elements, but are essentially non-functional, is very shallow. This contrasts with the gaping deeply recessed arch which makes a huge portico before the main door. The size of this arch is in direct contrast to the two low square-topped openings that frame it. The light and shade play dramatically over the surface of the building because of the shallowness of its mouldings and the depth of its porch. In the interior Alberti has dispensed with the traditional nave and aisles. Instead there is a slow and majestic progression of alternating tall arches and low square doorways, repeating the "triumphal arch" motif of the façade.

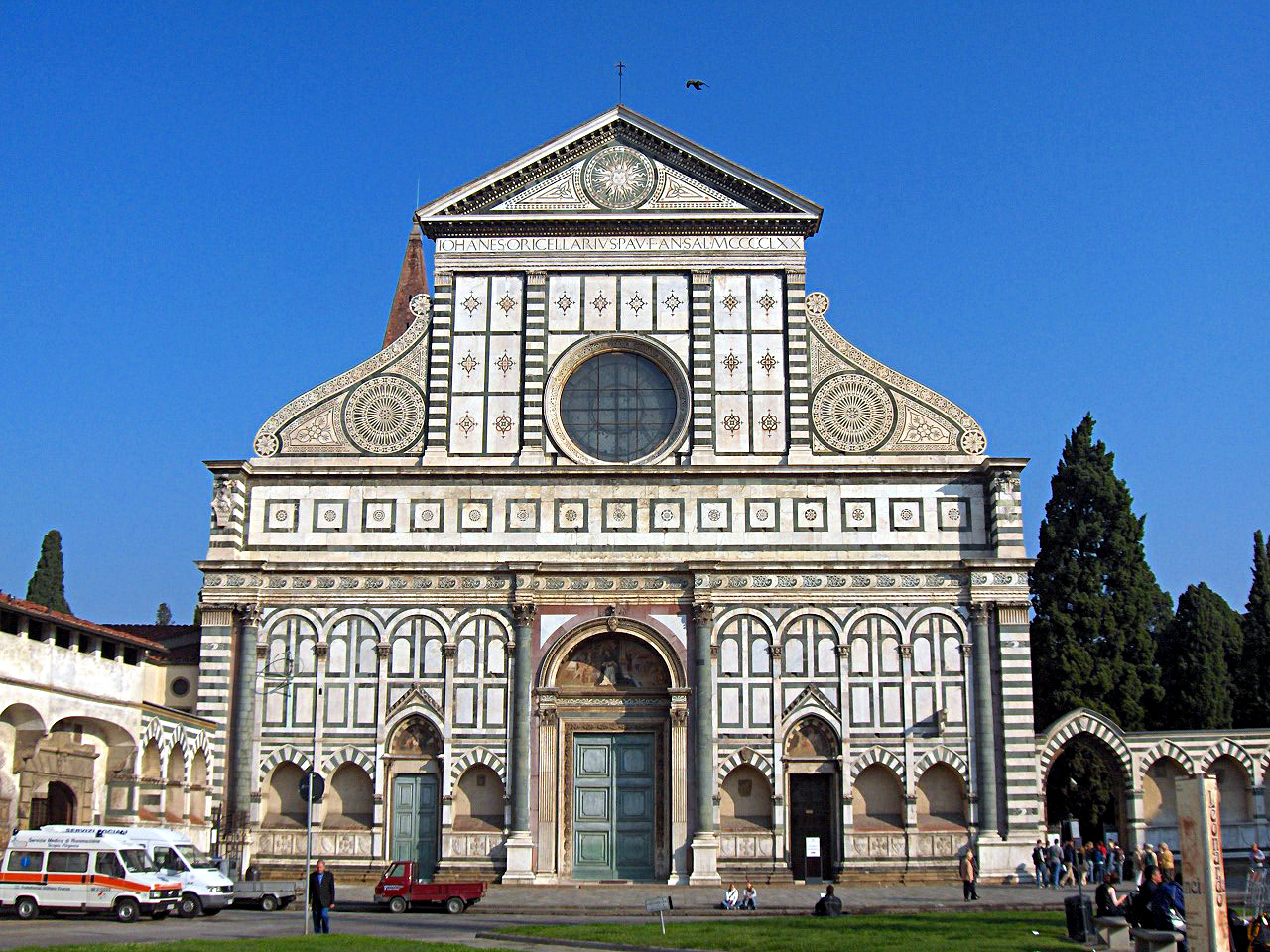
Façade of Santa Maria Novella, Florence, 1456–1470

Two of Alberti's best known buildings are in Florence, the Palazzo Rucellai and at Santa Maria Novella. For the palace, Alberti applied the classical orders of columns to the façade on the three levels, 1446–1451. At Santa Maria Novella he was commissioned to finish the decoration of the façade. He completed the design in 1456 but the work was not finished until 1470.

The lower section of the building had Gothic niches and typical polychrome marble decoration. There was a large ocular window in the end of the nave which had to be taken into account. Alberti simply respected what was already in place, and the Florentine tradition for polychrome that was well established at the Baptistery of San Giovanni, the most revered building in the city. The decoration, being mainly polychrome marble, is mostly very flat in nature, but a sort of order is established by the regular compartments and the circular motifs which repeat the shape of the round window. For the first time, Alberti linked the lower roofs of the aisles to nave using two large scrolls. These were to become a standard Renaissance device for solving the problem of different roof heights and bridge the space between horizontal and vertical surfaces.

== High Renaissance ==
In the late 15th century and early 16th century, architects such as Bramante, Antonio da Sangallo the Younger and others showed a mastery of the revived style and ability to apply it to buildings such as churches and city palazzo which were quite different from the structures of ancient times. The style became more decorated and ornamental, statuary, domes and cupolas becoming very evident. The architectural period is known as the "High Renaissance" and coincides with the age of Leonardo, Michelangelo and Raphael.

=== Bramante ===
Donato Bramante, (1444–1514), was born in Urbino and turned from painting to architecture, finding his first important patronage under Ludovico Sforza, Duke of Milan, for whom he produced a number of buildings over 20 years. After the fall of Milan to the French in 1499, Bramante travelled to Rome where he achieved great success under papal patronage.

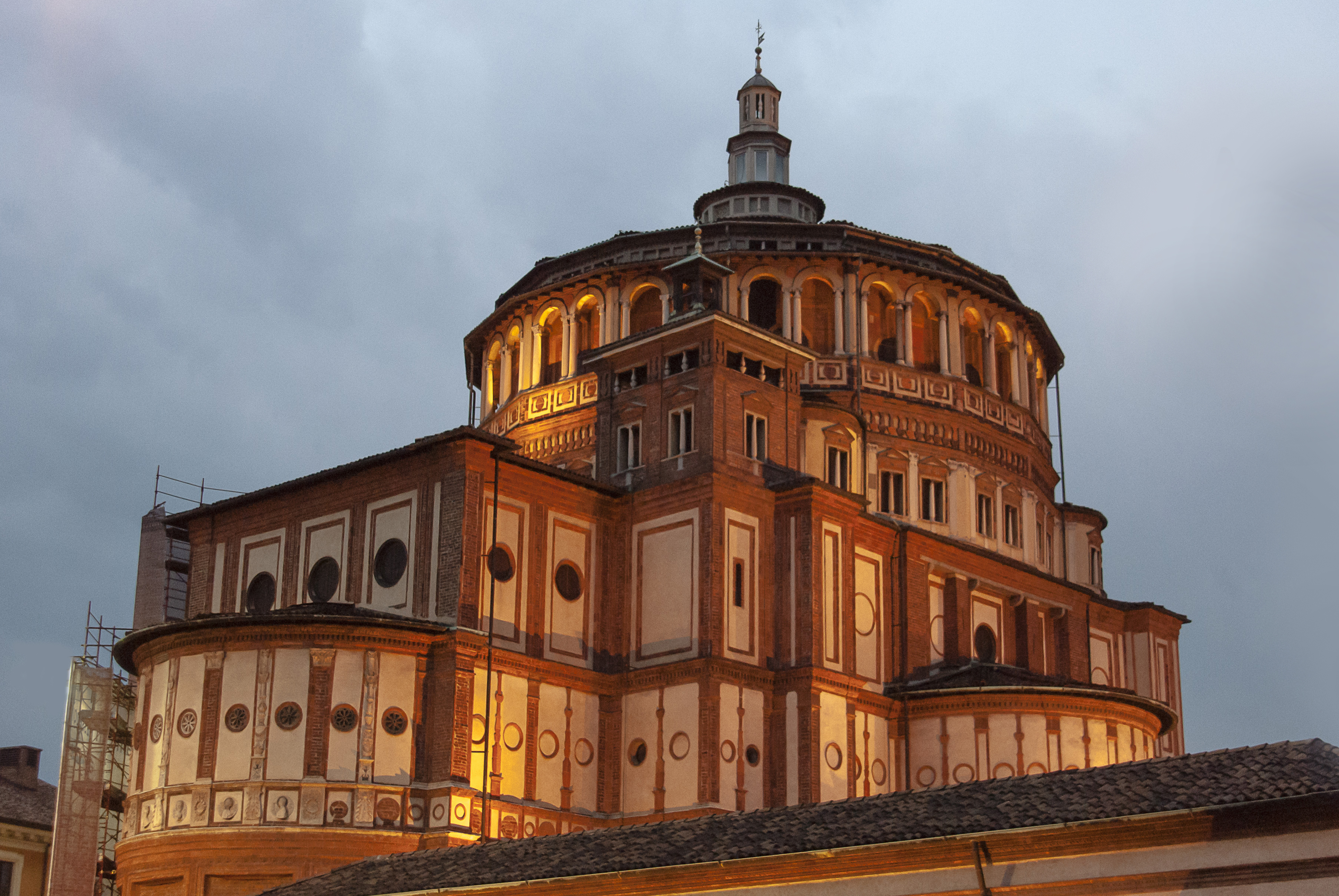
Crossing of Santa Maria delle Grazie, Milan, 1490

Bramante's finest architectural achievement in Milan is his addition of crossing and choir to the abbey church of Santa Maria delle Grazie (Milan). This is a brick structure, the form of which owes much to the Northern Italian tradition of square domed baptisteries. The new building is almost centrally planned, except that, because of the site, the chancel extends further than the transept arms. The hemispherical dome, of approximately 20 metres across, rises up hidden inside an octagonal drum pierced at the upper level with arched classical openings. The whole exterior has delineated details decorated with the local terracotta ornamentation. From 1488 to 1492 he worked for Ascanio Sforza on Pavia Cathedral, on which he imposed a central plan scheme and built some apses and the crypt, inspired by the thermal baths of the Roman age.

In Rome Bramante created what has been described as "a perfect architectural gem", the Tempietto in the Cloister of San Pietro in Montorio. This small circular temple marks the spot where St Peter was martyred and is thus the most sacred site in Rome. The building adapts the style apparent in the remains of the Temple of Vesta, the most sacred site of Ancient Rome. It is enclosed by and in spatial contrast with the cloister which surrounds it. As approached from the cloister, as in the picture above, it is seen framed by an arch and columns, the shape of which are echoed in its free-standing form.

Bramante went on to work on the Apostolic Palace, where he designed the Cortile del Belvedere. In 1506 his design for Pope Julius II's rebuilding of St. Peter's Basilica was selected, and the foundation stone laid. After Bramante's death and many changes of plan, Michelangelo, as chief architect, reverted to something closer to Bramante's original proposal.

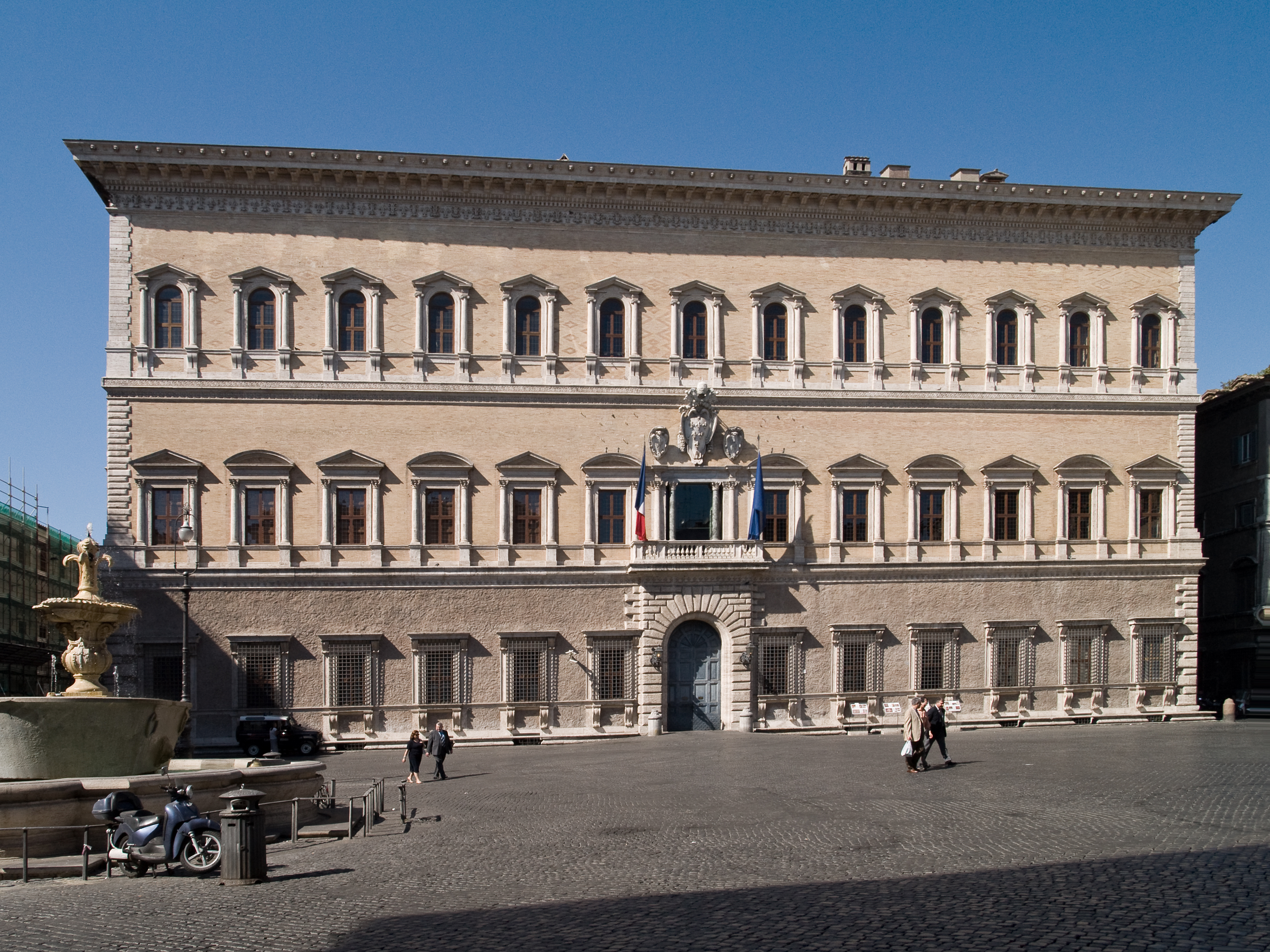
Palazzo Farnese, Rome, 1534–1545. Designed by Antonio da Sangallo the Younger and Michelangelo.

=== Sangallo ===
Antonio da Sangallo the Younger (1485–1546) was one of a family of military engineers. His uncle, Giuliano da Sangallo was one of those who submitted a plan for the rebuilding of St Peter's and was briefly a co-director of the project, with Raphael.

Antonio da Sangallo also submitted a plan for St Peter's and became the chief architect after the death of Raphael, to be succeeded himself by Michelangelo.

His fame does not rest upon his association with St Peter's but in his building of the Farnese Palace, "the grandest palace of this period", started in 1530. The impression of grandness lies in part in its sheer size, (56 m long by 29.5 meters high) and in its lofty location overlooking a broad piazza. Unusually for such a large and luxurious house of the time, it was built principally of stuccoed brick, rather than of stone. Against the smooth pink-washed walls the stone quoins of the corners, the massive rusticated portal and the repetition of finely detailed windows produce an elegant effect. The upper of the three equally sized floors was added by Michelangelo. The travertine for its architectural details came not from a quarry, but from the Colosseum.

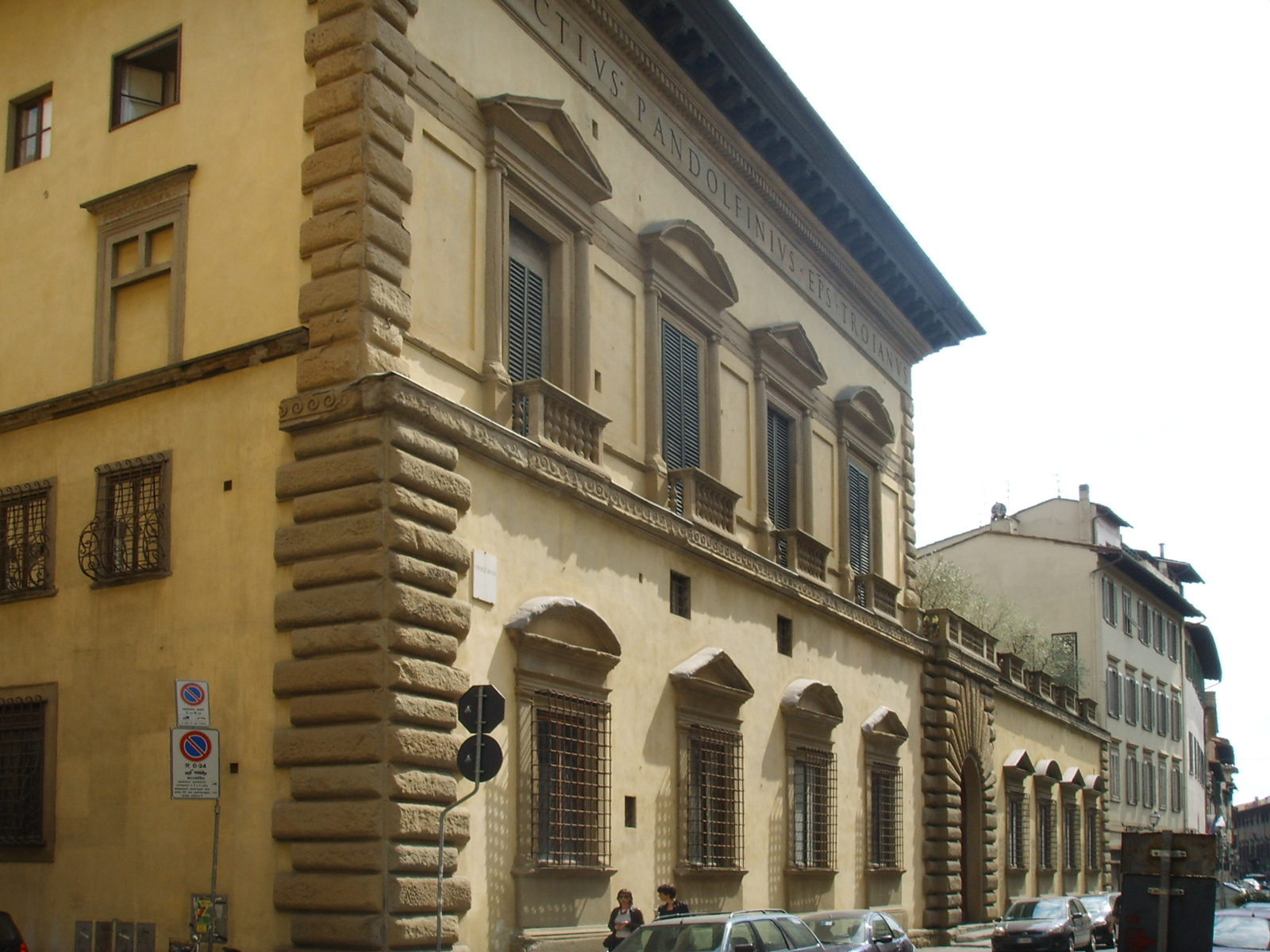
Palazzo Pandolfini, Florence, by Raphael

=== Raphael ===
Raphael (1483–1520), born in Urbino, trained under Perugino in Perugia before moving to Florence, was for a time the chief architect for St. Peter's, working in conjunction with Antonio Sangallo. He also designed a number of buildings, most of which were finished by others. His single most influential work is the Palazzo Pandolfini in Florence with its two stories of strongly articulated windows of a "tabernacle" type, each set around with ordered pilasters, cornice and alternate arched and triangular pediments.

== Mannerism ==
Mannerism in architecture was marked by widely diverging tendencies in the work of Michelangelo, Giulio Romano, Baldassare Peruzzi and Andrea Palladio, that led to the Baroque style in which the same architectural vocabulary was used for very different rhetoric.

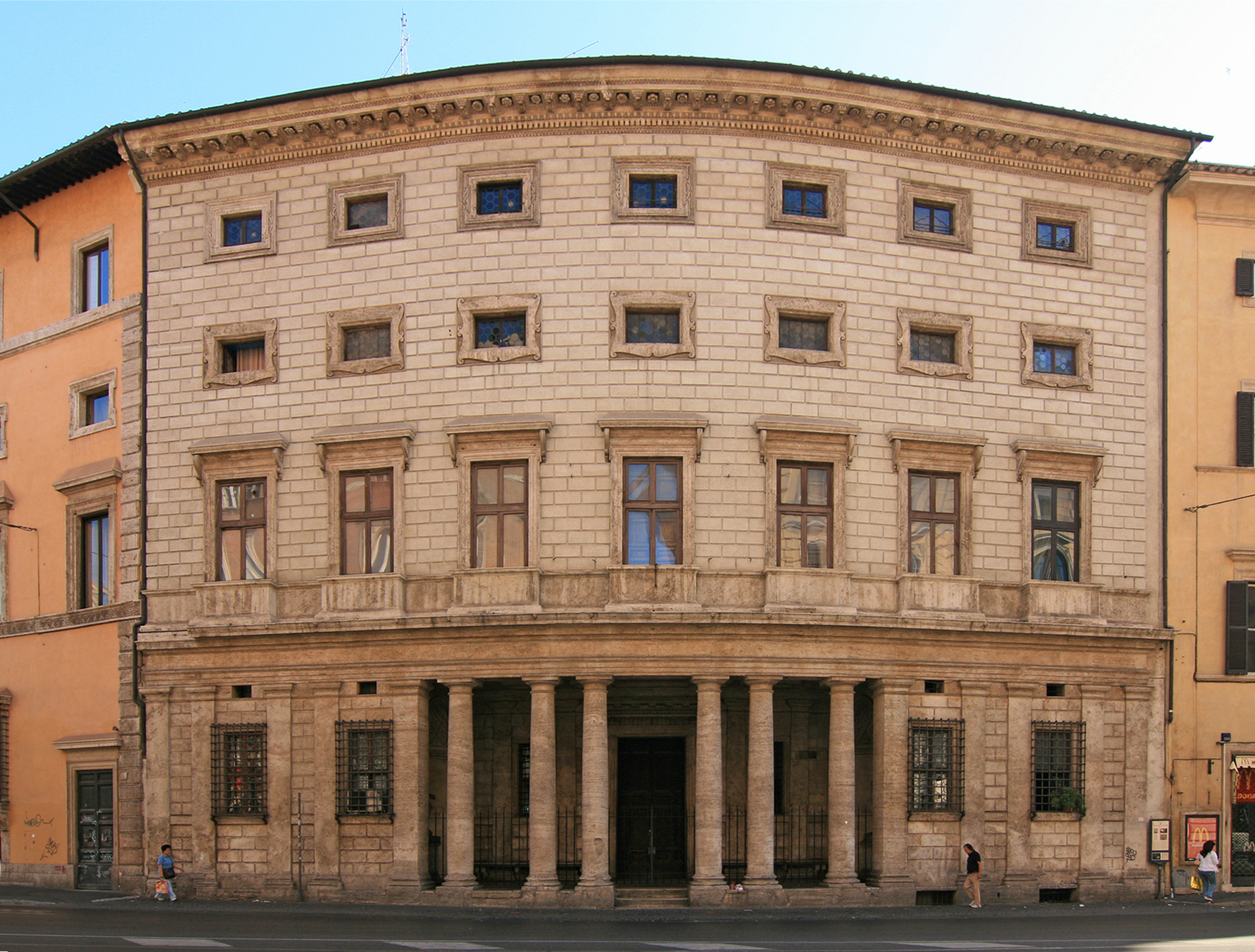
Palazzo Massimo alle Colonne, Rome

=== Peruzzi ===
Baldassare Peruzzi, (1481–1536), was an architect born in Siena, but working in Rome, whose work bridges the High Renaissance and the Mannerist period. His Villa Farnesina of 1509 is a very regular monumental cube of two equal stories, the bays being strongly articulated by orders of pilasters. The building is unusual for its frescoed walls.

Peruzzi's most famous work is the Palazzo Massimo alle Colonne in Rome. The unusual features of this building are that its façade curves gently around a curving street. It has in its ground floor a dark central portico running parallel to the street, but as a semi enclosed space, rather than an open loggia. Above this rise three undifferentiated floors, the upper two with identical small horizontal windows in thin flat frames which contrast strangely with the deep porch, which has served, from the time of its construction, as a refuge to the city's poor.

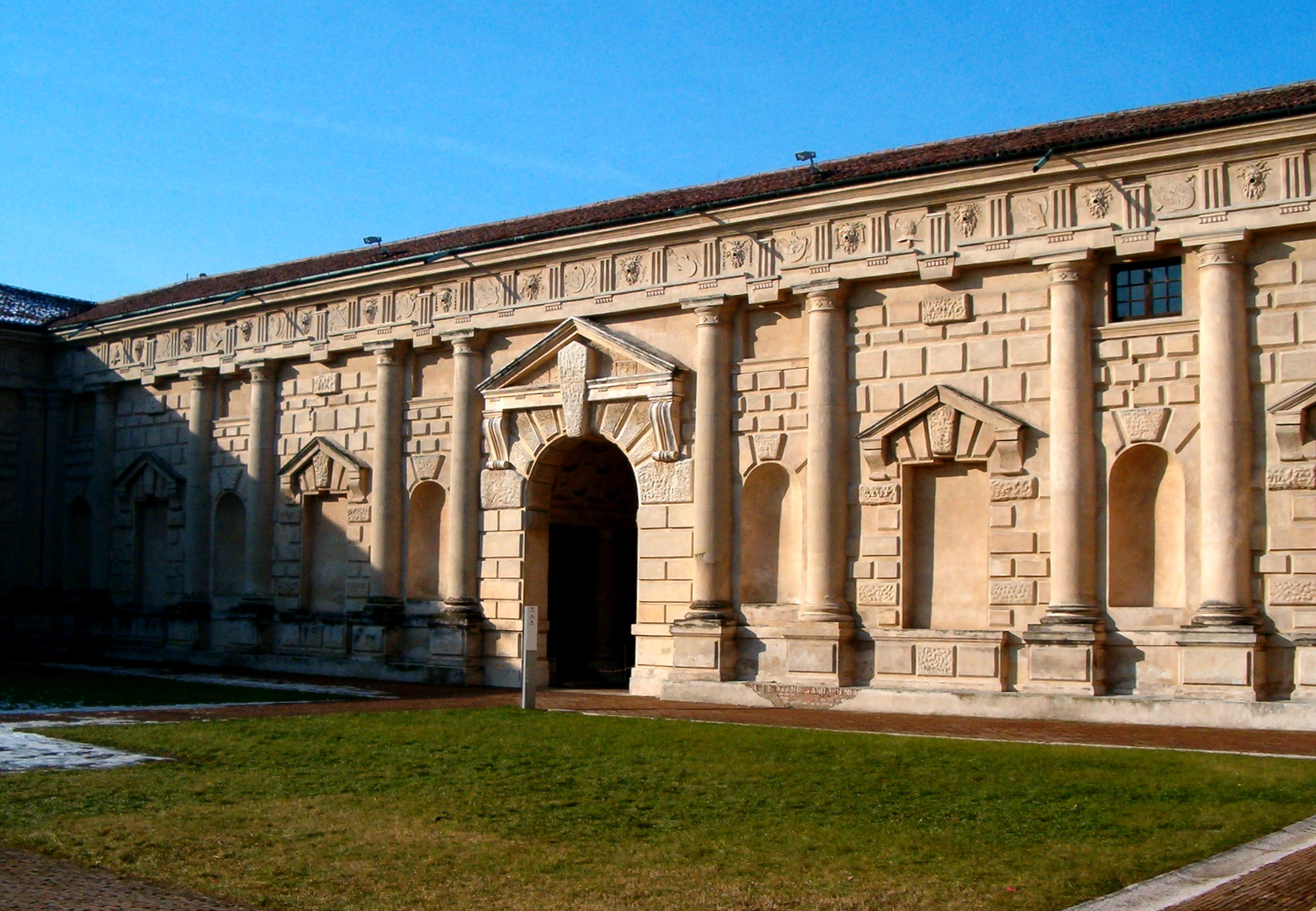
Palazzo Te, Mantua

=== Giulio Romano ===
Giulio Romano (1499–1546), was a pupil of Raphael, assisting him on various works for the Vatican. Romano was also a highly inventive designer, working for Federico II Gonzaga at Mantua on the Palazzo Te (1524–1534), a project which combined his skills as architect, sculptor and painter. In this work, incorporating garden grottoes and extensive frescoes, he uses illusionistic effects, surprising combinations of architectural form and texture, and the frequent use of features that seem somewhat disproportionate or out of alignment. The total effect is eerie and disturbing. Ilan Rachum cites Romano as "one of the first promoters of Mannerism".

=== Michelangelo ===
Michelangelo Buonarroti (1475–1564) was one of the creative giants whose achievements mark the High Renaissance. He excelled in each of the fields of painting, sculpture and architecture, and his achievements brought about significant changes in each area. His architectural fame lies chiefly in two buildings: the interiors of the Laurentian Library and its lobby at the monastery of San Lorenzo in Florence, and St Peter's Basilica in Rome.

St. Peter's was "the greatest creation of the Renaissance", and a great number of architects contributed their skills to it. But at its completion, there was more of Michelangelo's design than of any other architect, before or after him.

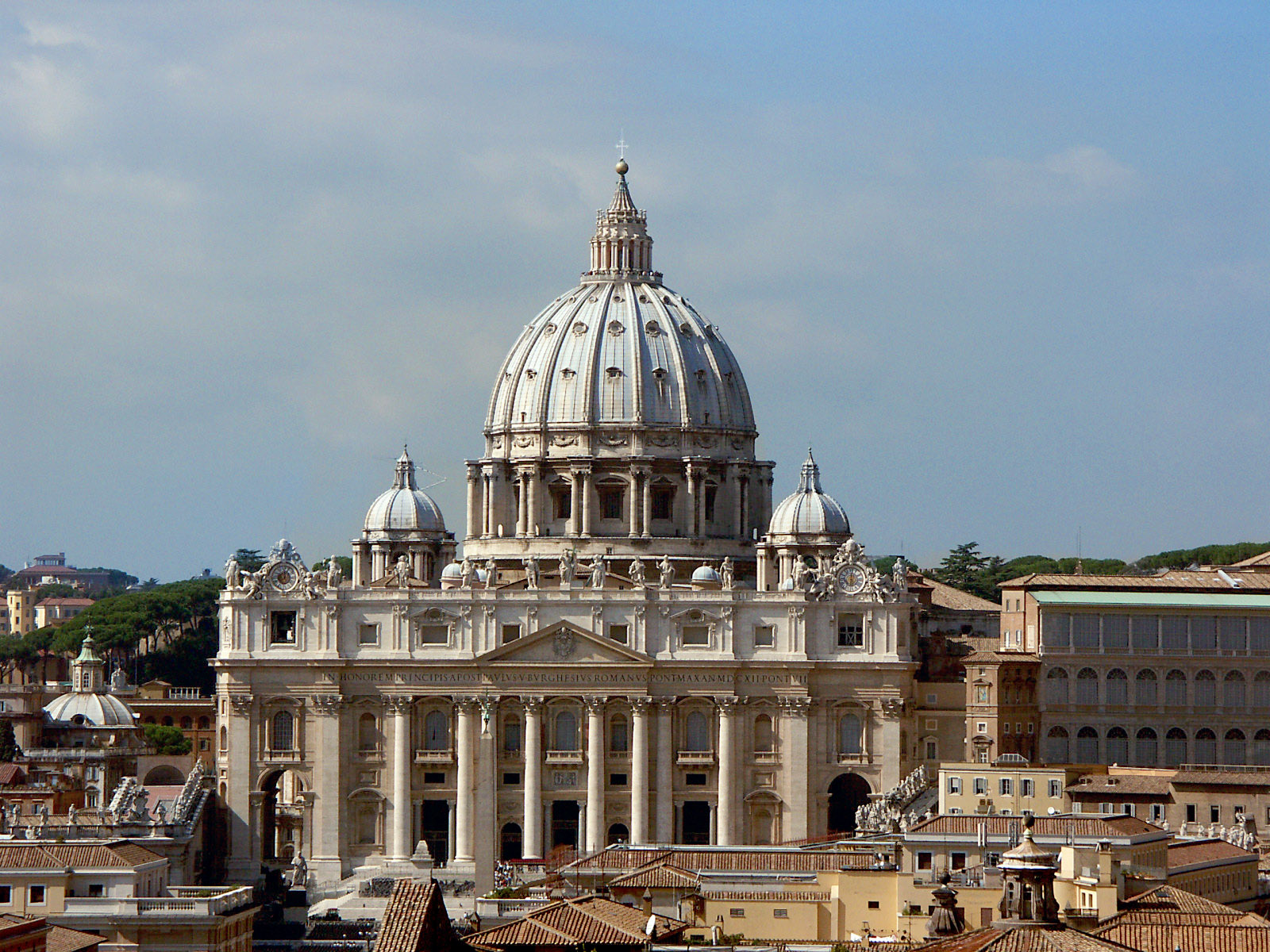
St Peter's Basilica

==== St. Peter's ====
The plan that was accepted at the laying of the foundation stone in 1506 was that by Bramante. Various changes in plan occurred in the series of architects that succeeded him, but Michelangelo, when he took over the project in 1546, reverted to Bramante's Greek-cross plan and redesigned the piers, the walls and the dome, giving the lower weight-bearing members massive proportions and eliminating the encircling aisles from the chancel and identical transept arms. Helen Gardner says: "Michelangelo, with a few strokes of the pen, converted its snowflake complexity into a massive, cohesive unity."

Michelangelo's dome was a masterpiece of design using two masonry shells, one within the other and crowned by a massive roof lantern supported, as at Florence, on ribs. For the exterior of the building he designed a giant order which defines every external bay, the whole lot being held together by a wide cornice which runs unbroken like a rippling ribbon around the entire building.

There is a wooden model of the dome, showing its outer shell as hemispherical. When Michelangelo died in 1564, the building had reached the height of the drum. The architect who succeeded Michelangelo was Giacomo della Porta. The dome, as built, has a much steeper projection than the dome of the model. It is generally presumed that it was della Porta who made this change to the design, to lessen the outward thrust. But, in fact it is unknown who it was that made this change, and it is equally possible and a stylistic likelihood that the person who decided upon the more dynamic outline was Michelangelo himself at some time during the years that he supervised the project. (Note: Pevsner and Gardener suggest that Michelangelo began with the idea of a pointed dome, as in Florence, then in his old age reverted to the lower silhouette, and that della Porta stuck to Michelangelo's original concept. Mignacca, on the other hand, suggests that the pointed dome was Michelangelo's final, and brilliant, solution to the apparent visual tension within the building.)

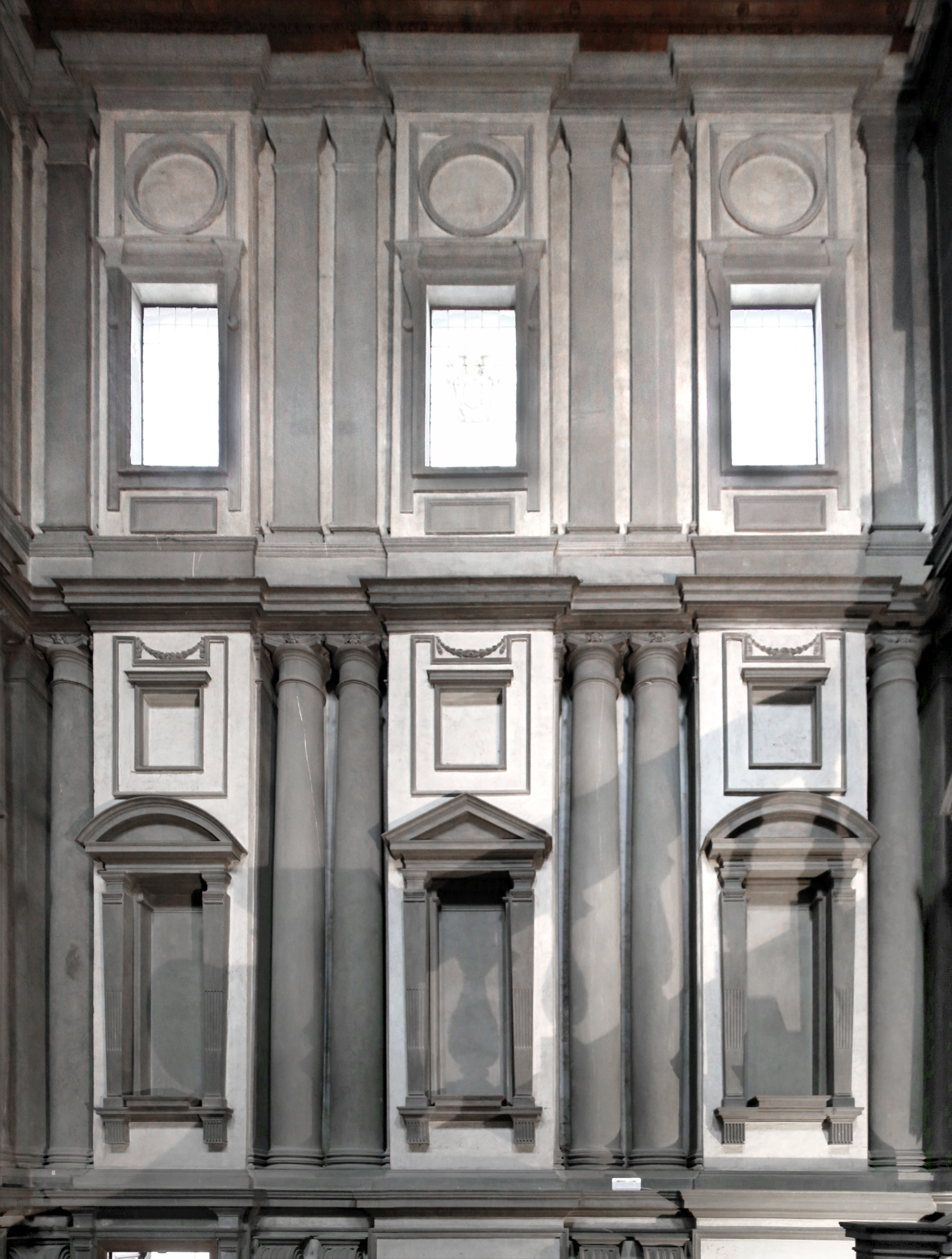
Vestibule of the Laurentian Library

==== Laurentian Library ====
Michelangelo was at his most Mannerist in the design of the vestibule of the Laurentian Library, also built by him to house the Medici collection of books at the convent of San Lorenzo, Florence, the same San Lorenzo's at which Brunelleschi had recast church architecture into a Classical mold and established clear formula for the use of Classical orders and their various components.

Michelangelo takes all Brunelleschi's components and bends them to his will. The Library is upstairs. It is a long low building with an ornate wooden ceiling, a matching floor and crowded with corrals finished by his successors to Michelangelo's design. But it is a light room, the natural lighting streaming through a long row of windows that appear positively crammed between the order of pilasters that march along the wall. The vestibule, on the other hand, is tall, taller than it is wide and is crowded by a large staircase that pours out of the library in what Nikolaus Pevsner refers to as a "flow of lava", and bursts in three directions when it meets the balustrade of the landing. It is an intimidating staircase, made all the more so because the rise of the stairs at the center is steeper than at the two sides, fitting only eight steps into the space of nine.

The space is crowded and it is to be expected that the wall spaces would be divided by pilasters of low projection. But Michelangelo has chosen to use paired columns, which, instead of standing out boldly from the wall, he has sunk deep into recesses within the wall itself. In the Basilica di San Lorenzo nearby, Brunelleschi used little scrolling console brackets to break the strongly horizontal line of the course above the arcade. Michelangelo has borrowed Brunelleschi's motifs and stood each pair of sunken columns on a pair of twin console brackets. Pevsner says the "Laurenziana [...] reveals Mannerism in its most sublime architectural form".

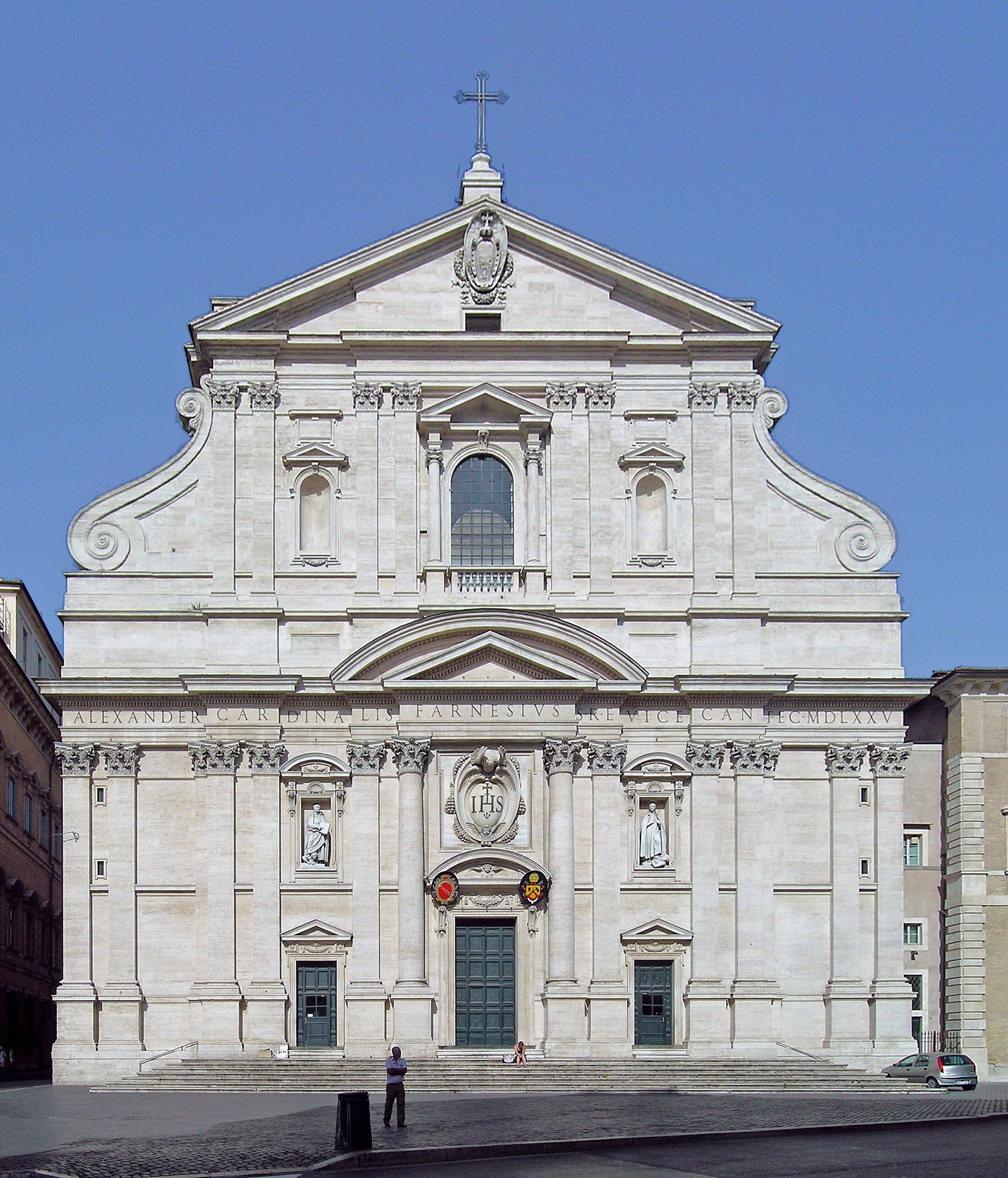
Church of the Gesù, designed by Giacomo della Porta, 1568–1584

=== Giacomo della Porta ===
Giacomo della Porta, (c. 1533–1602), was famous as the architect who made the dome of St. Peter's Basilica a reality. The change in outline between the dome as it appears in the model and the dome as it was built, has brought about speculation as to whether the changes originated with della Porta or with Michelangelo himself.

Della Porta spent nearly all his working life in Rome, designing villas, palazzi and churches in the Mannerist style. One of his most famous works is the façade of the Church of the Gesù, a project that he inherited from his teacher Jacopo Barozzi da Vignola. Most characteristics of the original design are maintained, subtly transformed to give more weight to the central section, where della Porta uses, among other motifs, a low triangular pediment overlaid on a segmental one above the main door. The upper storey and its pediment give the impression of compressing the lower one. The center section, like that of Sant'Andrea at Mantua, is based on the triumphal arch, but has two clear horizontal divisions like Santa Maria Novella. ^{See Alberti above.} The problem of linking the aisles to the nave is solved using Alberti's scrolls, in contrast to Vignola's solution which provided much smaller brackets and four statues to stand above the paired pilasters, visually weighing down the corners of the building. The influence of the design may be seen in Baroque churches throughout Europe.

=== Andrea Palladio ===
Andrea Palladio, (1508–80), "the most influential architect of the whole Renaissance", was, as a stonemason, introduced to Humanism by the poet Giangiorgio Trissino. His first major architectural commission was the rebuilding of the Basilica Palladiana at Vicenza, in the Veneto where he was to work most of his life.

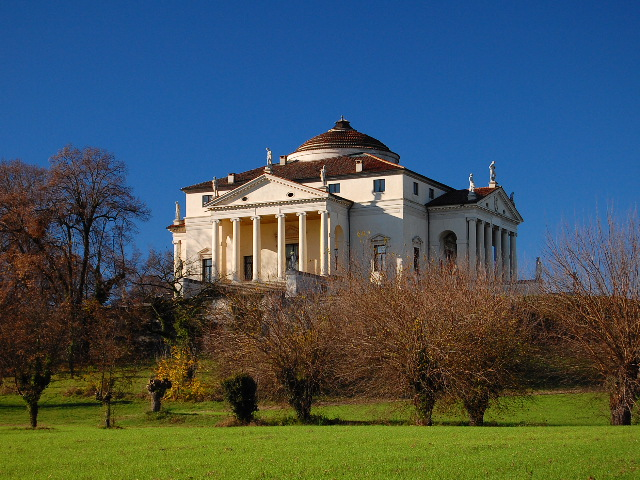
Villa Capra "La Rotonda"

Palladio was to transform the architectural style of both palaces and churches by taking a different perspective on the notion of Classicism. While the architects of Florence and Rome looked to structures like the Colosseum and the Arch of Constantine to provide formulae, Palladio looked to classical temples with their simple peristyle form. When he used the triumphal arch motif of a large arched opening with lower square-topped opening on either side, he invariably applied it on a small scale, such as windows, rather than on a large scale as Alberti used it at Sant'Andrea's. This Ancient Roman motif is often referred to as the Palladian Arch.

The best known of Palladio's domestic buildings is Villa Capra, otherwise known as "La Rotonda", a centrally planned house with a domed central hall and four identical façades, each with a temple-like portico like that of the Pantheon, Rome. At the Villa Cornaro, the projecting portico of the north façade and recessed loggia of the garden façade are of two ordered stories, the upper forming a balcony.

Like Alberti, della Porta and others, in the designing of a church façade, Palladio was confronted by the problem of visually linking the aisles to the nave while maintaining and defining the structure of the building. Palladio's solution was entirely different from that employed by della Porta. At the church of San Giorgio Maggiore in Venice he overlays a tall temple, its columns raised on high plinths, over another low wide temple façade, its columns rising from the basements and its narrow lintel and pilasters appearing behind the giant order of the central nave.

== Progression from Early Renaissance through to Baroque ==
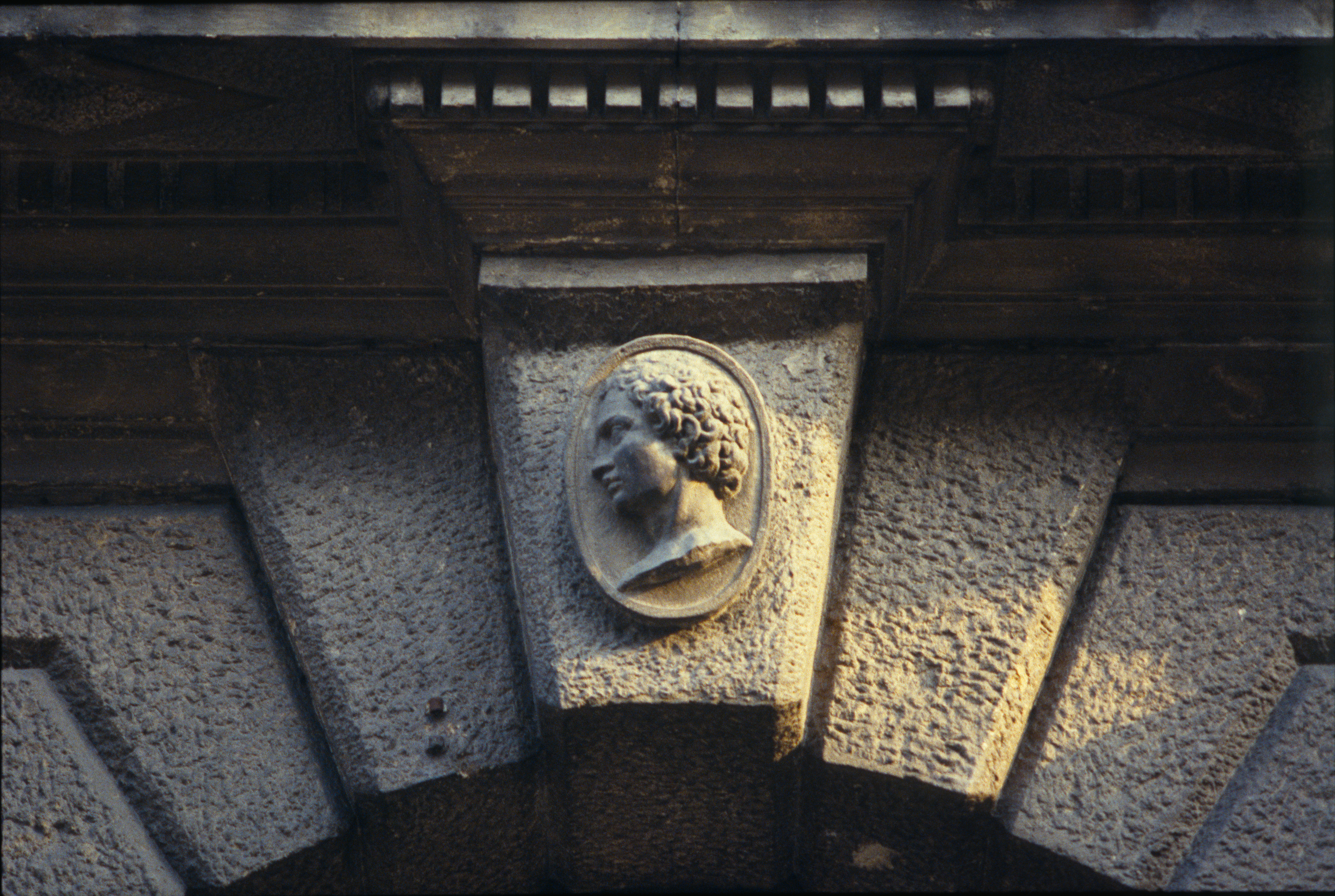
Keystone with a profile of a man, Palazzo Giusti, Verona, Italy

In Italy, there appears to be a seamless progression from Early Renaissance architecture through the High Renaissance and Mannerism to the Baroque style. Pevsner comments about the vestibule of the Laurentian Library that it "has often been said that the motifs of the walls show Michelangelo as the father of the Baroque".

While continuity may be the case in Italy, it was not necessarily the case elsewhere. The adoption of the Renaissance style of architecture was slower in some areas than in others, as may be seen in England, for example. Indeed, as Pope Julius II was having the Old St. Peter's Basilica demolished to make way for the new, Henry VII of England was adding a glorious new chapel in the Perpendicular Gothic style to Westminster Abbey.

Likewise, the style that was to become known as Baroque evolved in Italy in the early 17th century, at about the time that the first fully Renaissance buildings were constructed at Greenwich and Whitehall in England, (Note: The Queen's House, Greenwich and the Banqueting House, Whitehall) after a prolonged period of experimentation with Classical motifs applied to local architectural forms, or conversely, the adoption of Renaissance structural forms in the broadest sense with an absence of the formulae that governed their use. While the English were just discovering what the rules of Classicism were, the Italians were experimenting with methods of breaking them. In England, following the Restoration of the Monarchy in 1660, the architectural climate changed, and taste moved in the direction of the Baroque. Rather than evolving, as it did in Italy, it arrived fully fledged.

In a similar way, in many parts of Europe that had few purely classical and ordered buildings like Brunelleschi's Santo Spirito and Michelozzo's Medici Riccardi Palace, Baroque architecture appeared almost unheralded, on the heels of a sort of Proto-Renaissance local style. The spread of the Baroque and its replacement of traditional and more conservative Renaissance architecture was particularly apparent in the building of churches as part of the Counter Reformation.

== Spread in Europe ==
The 16th century saw the economic and political ascendancy of France, Spain and Portugal, then later the rise of England, Poland and Russia and the Dutch Republic. The result was that these places began to import the Renaissance style as indicators of their new cultural position. This also meant that it was not until about 1500 and later that signs of Renaissance architectural style began to appear outside Italy.

Though Italian architects were highly sought after, such as Sebastiano Serlio in France, Aristotile Fioravanti in Russia, and Francesco Fiorentino in Poland, soon, non-Italians were studying Italian architecture and translating it into their own idiom. These included Philibert de l'Orme (1510–1570) in France, Juan Bautista de Toledo (died: 1567) in Spain, Inigo Jones (1573–1652) in England and Elias Holl (1573–1646) in Germany.

Books or ornament prints with engraved illustrations demonstrating plans and ornament were very important in spreading Renaissance styles in Northern Europe, with among the most important authors being Androuet du Cerceau in France, and Hans Vredeman de Vries in the Netherlands, and Wendel Dietterlin, author of Architectura (1593–94) in Germany.

=== Baltic region ===
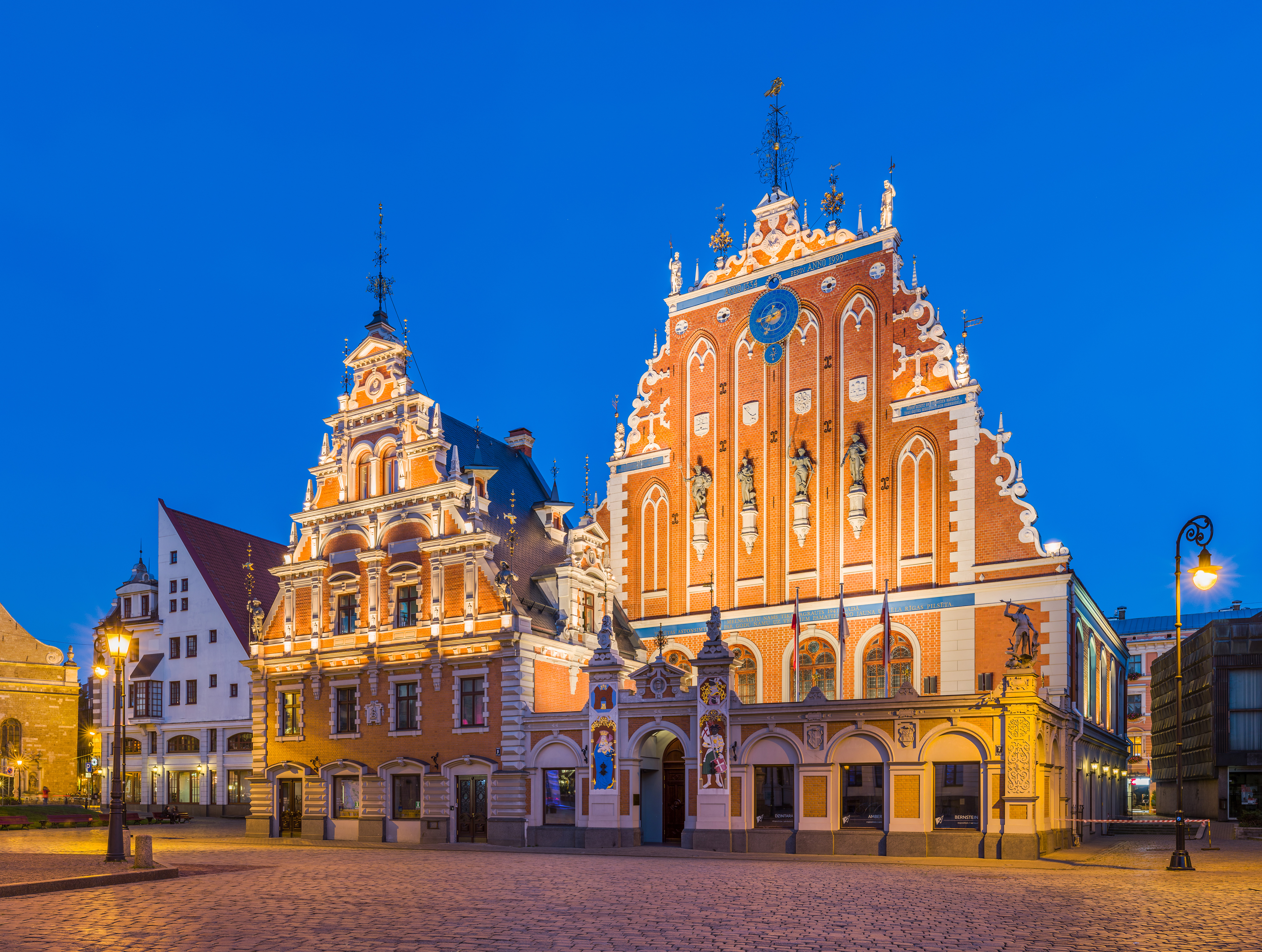
House of the Blackheads in Riga, Latvia

The Renaissance arrived late in what is today Estonia, Latvia and Lithuania, the so-called Baltic States, and did not make a great imprint architecturally. It was a politically tumultuous time, marked by the decline of the State of the Teutonic Order and the Livonian War.

In Estonia, artistic influences came from Dutch, Swedish and Polish sources. The building of the Brotherhood of the Blackheads in Tallinn with a façade designed by Arent Passer, is the only truly Renaissance building in the country that has survived more or less intact. Significantly for these troubled times, the only other examples are purely military buildings, such as the Fat Margaret cannon tower, also in Tallinn.

Latvian Renaissance architecture was influenced by Polish–Lithuanian and Dutch style, with Mannerism following from Gothic without intermediaries. St. John's Church in the Latvian capital of Riga is an example of an earlier Gothic church which was reconstructed in 1587–89 by the Dutch architect Gert Freze (Joris Phraeze). The prime example of Renaissance architecture in Latvia is the heavily decorated House of the Blackheads, rebuilt from an earlier Medieval structure into its present Mannerist forms as late as 1619–1625 by the architects A. and L. Jansen. It was destroyed during World War II and rebuilt during the 1990s.

Lithuania meanwhile formed a large dual state with Poland, known as the Polish–Lithuanian Commonwealth. Renaissance influences grew stronger during the reign of Sigismund I the Old and Sigismund II Augustus. The Palace of the Grand Dukes of Lithuania (destroyed in 1801, a copy built in 2002–2009) show Italian influences. Several architects of Italian origin were active in the country, including Bernardino Zanobi de Gianotis, Giovanni Cini and Giovanni Maria Mosca.

=== Bohemia ===
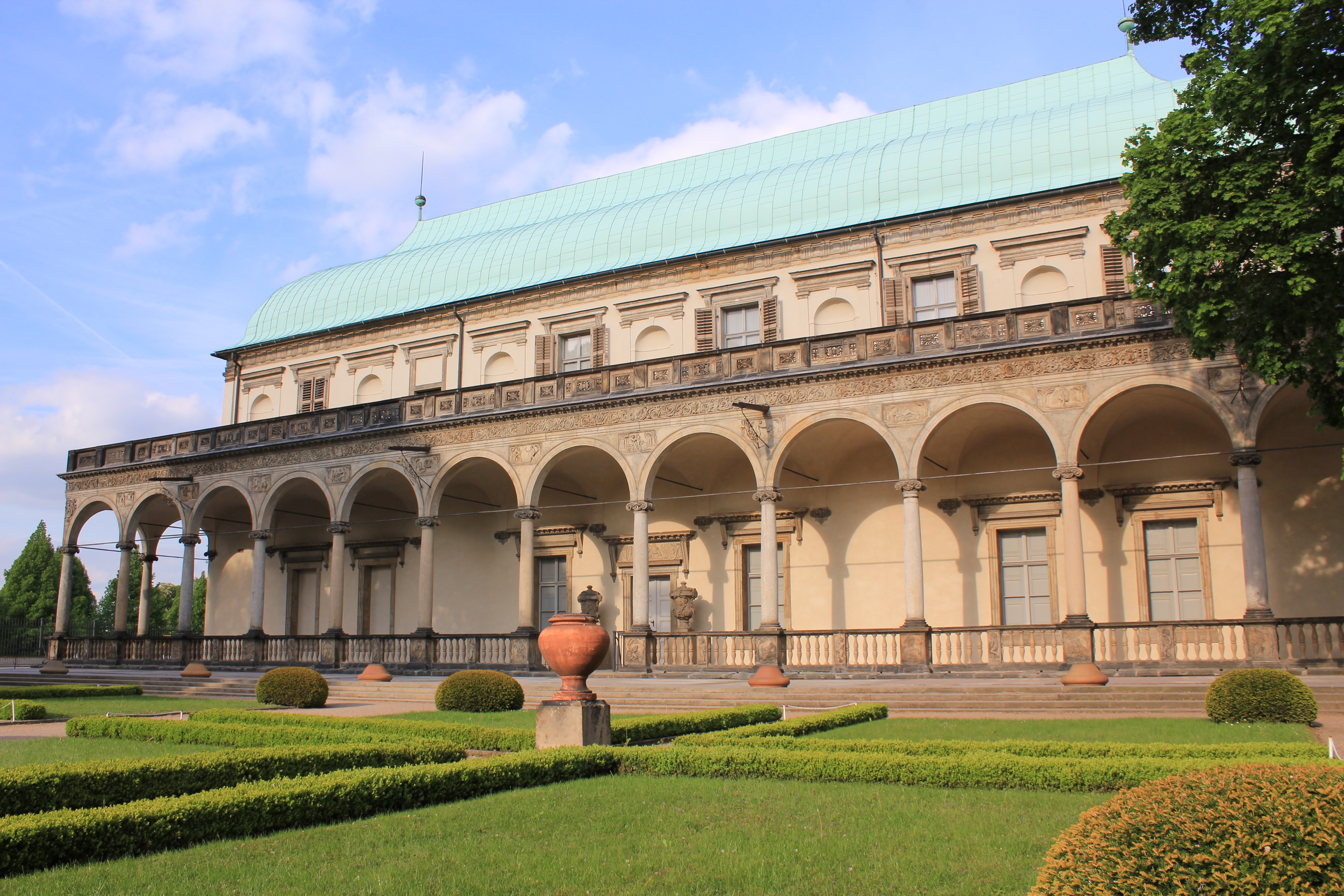
Royal Summer Palace in Prague is considered by Czechs the purest Renaissance architecture outside of Italy.

The Renaissance style first appeared in the Crown of Bohemia in the 1490s. Bohemia together with its incorporated lands, especially Moravia, thus ranked among the areas of the Holy Roman Empire with the earliest known examples of the Renaissance architecture.

The lands of the Bohemian Crown were never part of the ancient Roman Empire, thus they missed their own ancient classical heritage and had to be dependent on the primarily Italian models. As well as in other Central European countries the Gothic style kept its position especially in the church architecture. The traditional Gothic architecture was considered timeless and therefore able to express the sacredness. The Renaissance architecture coexisted with the Gothic style in Bohemia and Moravia until the late 16th century (e. g. the residential part of a palace was built in the modern Renaissance style but its chapel was designed with Gothic elements). The façades of Czech Renaissance buildings were often decorated with sgraffito (figural or ornamental).

During the reign of Rudolph II, Holy Roman Emperor and Bohemian king, the city of Prague became one of the most important European centers of the late Renaissance art (so-called Mannerism). Nevertheless, not many architecturally significant buildings have been preserved from that time.

=== Croatia ===
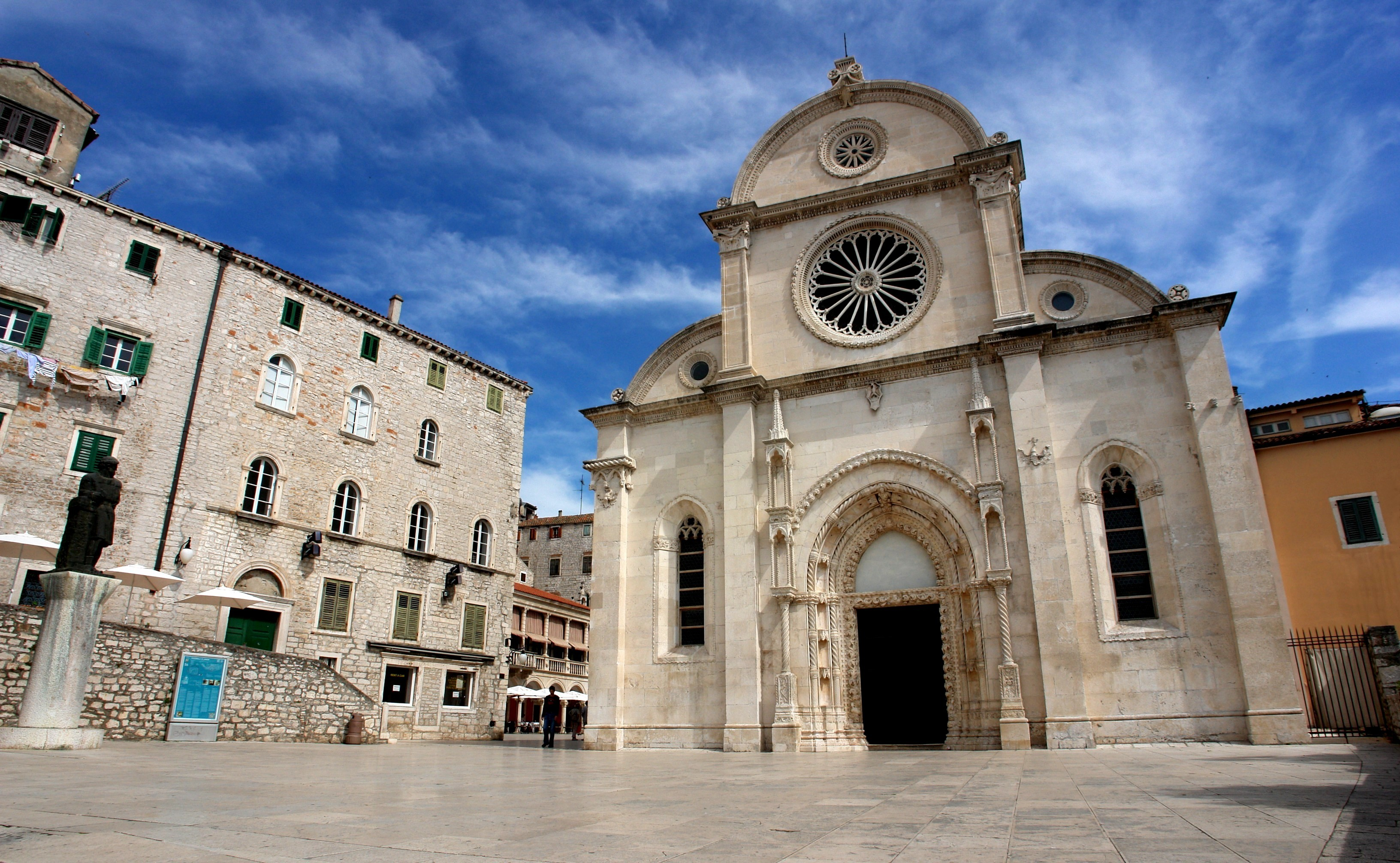
Cathedral of St James, Šibenik, Croatia

In the 15th century, Croatia was divided into three states: the northern and central part of Croatia and Slavonia were in union with the Kingdom of Hungary, while Dalmatia, with the exception of the independent Republic of Ragusa, was under the rule of the Venetian Republic. The Cathedral of St James in Šibenik, was begun in 1441 in the Gothic style by Giorgio da Sebenico (Juraj Dalmatinac). Its unusual construction does not use mortar, the stone blocks, pilasters and ribs being bonded with joints and slots in the way that was usual in wooden constructions. In 1477 the work was unfinished, and continued under Niccolò di Giovanni Fiorentino, who respected the mode of construction and the plan of the former architect, but continued the work which includes the upper windows, the vaults and the dome, in the Renaissance style. The combination of a high barrel vault with lower half-barrel vaults over the aisles the gives the façade its distinctive trefoil shape, the first of this type in the region. The cathedral was listed as a UNESCO World Heritage List in 2001.

=== England ===
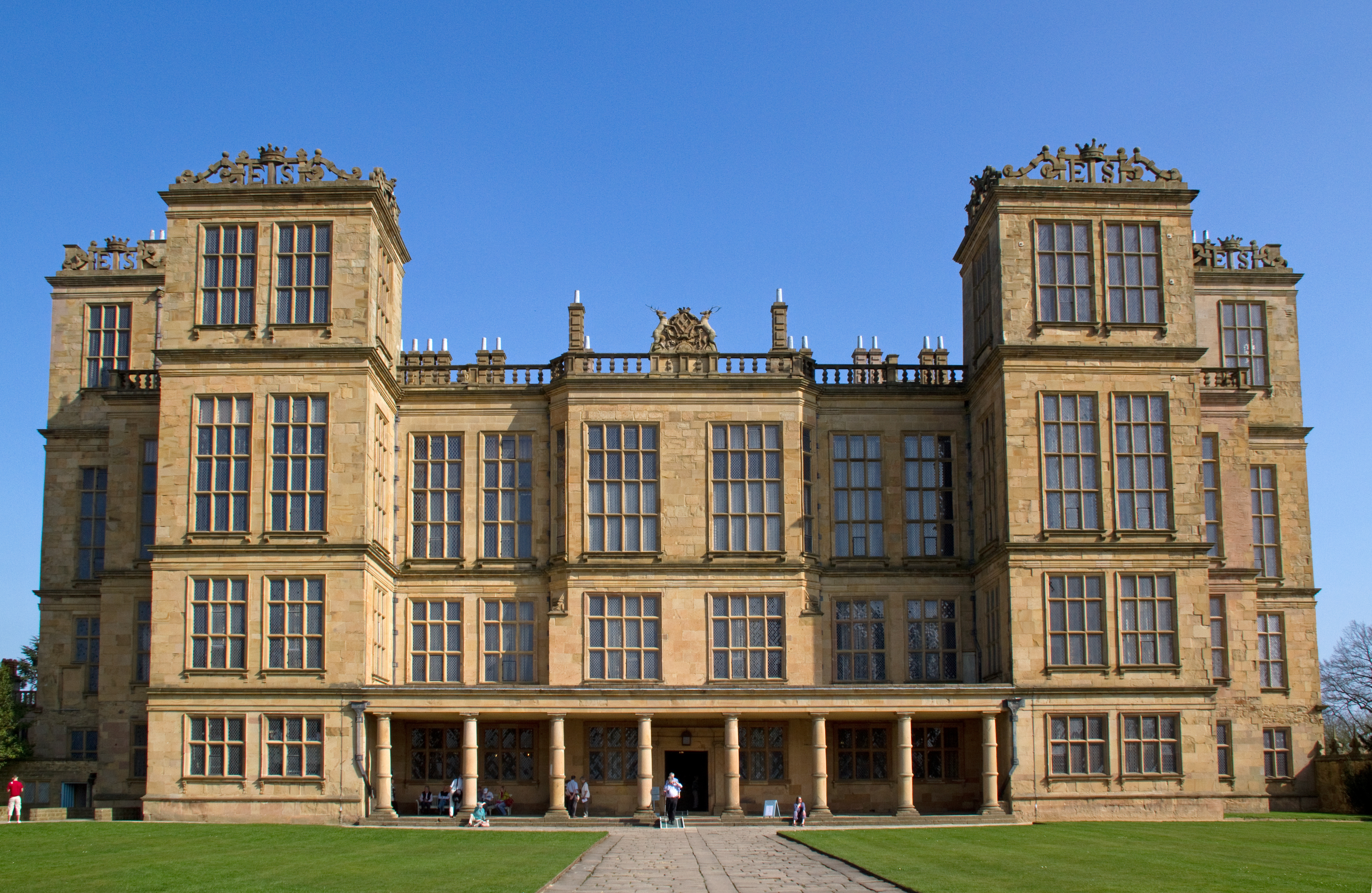
Elizabethan prodigy house, Hardwick Hall, England (1590–1597)

After some first efforts by kings and courtiers, most now vanished, like Henry VII's Richmond Palace (c. 1501), Henry VIII's Nonsuch Palace, and the first Somerset House in London, a local style of Renaissance architecture emerged in England during the reign of Elizabeth I, much influenced by the Low countries where among other features it acquired versions of the Dutch gable, and Flemish strapwork in geometric designs adorning the walls. The new style tended to manifest itself in large square tall prodigy houses such as Longleat House.

The first great exponent of classicizing Italian Renaissance architecture in England was Inigo Jones (1573–1652), who had studied architecture in Italy where the influence of Palladio was very strong. Jones returned to England full of enthusiasm for the new movement and immediately began to design such buildings as the Queen's House at Greenwich in 1616 and the Banqueting House, Whitehall three years later. These works, with their clean lines, and symmetry were revolutionary in a country still enamoured with mullion windows, crenellations and turrets.

=== France ===
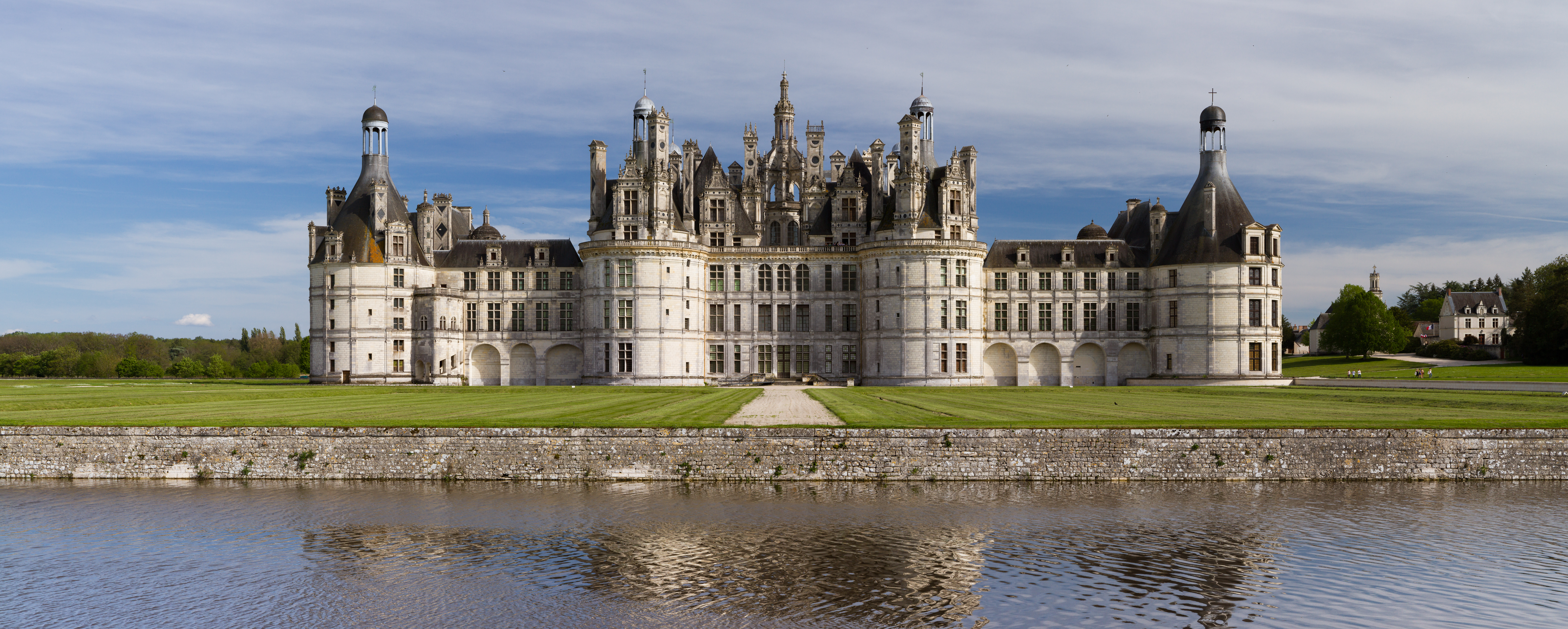
French Renaissance: Château de Chambord (1519–1539)

During the early years of the 16th century the French were involved in wars in northern Italy, bringing back to France not just the Renaissance art treasures as their war booty, but also stylistic ideas. In the Loire Valley a wave of building was carried and many Renaissance châteaux appeared at this time, the earliest example being the Château d'Amboise (c. 1495) in which Leonardo da Vinci spent his last years. The style became dominant under Francis I (See Châteaux of the Loire Valley).

=== Germany ===
The Renaissance in Germany was inspired first by German philosophers and artists such as Albrecht Dürer and Johannes Reuchlin who visited Italy. Important early examples of this period are especially the Landshut Residence, Heidelberg Castle, Johannisburg Palace in Aschaffenburg, Schloss Weilburg, the City Hall and Fugger Houses in Augsburg and St. Michael's Church, Munich. A particular form of Renaissance architecture in Germany is the Weser Renaissance, with prominent examples such as Bremen City Hall and the Juleum in Helmstedt.

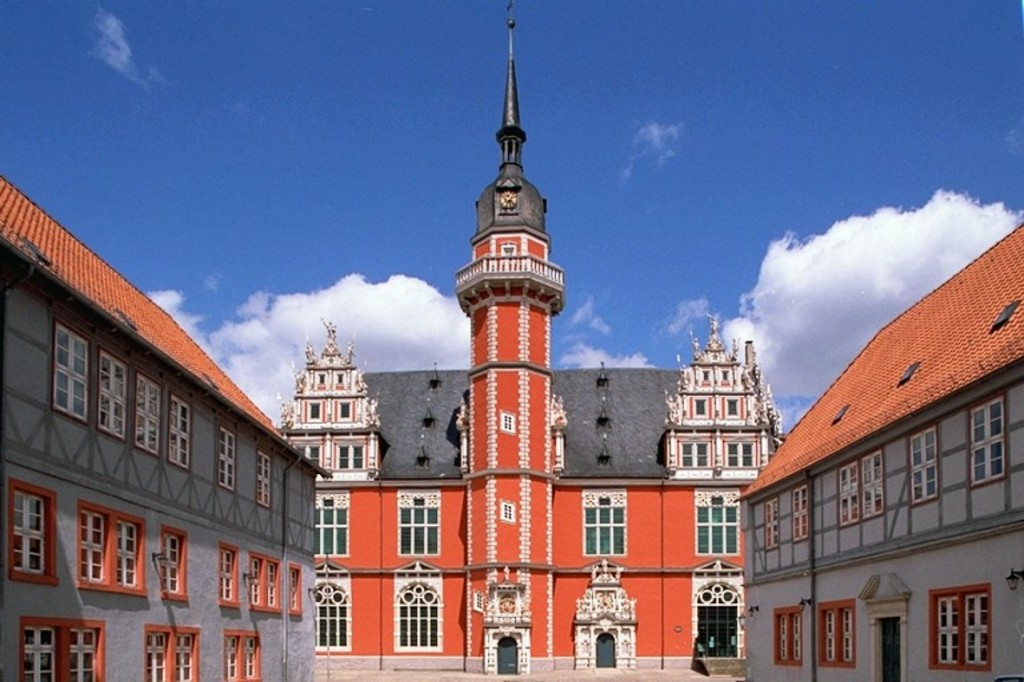
Juleum in Helmstedt, Germany (example of Weser Renaissance)

In July 1567 the city council of Cologne approved a design in the Renaissance style by Wilhelm Vernukken for a two storied loggia for Cologne City Hall. St Michael in Munich is the largest Renaissance church north of the Alps. It was built by William V, Duke of Bavaria between 1583 and 1597 as a spiritual center for the Counter Reformation and was inspired by the Church of the Gesù in Rome. The architect is unknown. Many examples of Brick Renaissance buildings can be found in Hanseatic old towns, such as Stralsund, Wismar, Lübeck, Lüneburg, Friedrichstadt and Stade. Notable German Renaissance architects include Friedrich Sustris, Benedikt Rejt, Abraham van den Blocke, Elias Holl and Hans Krumpper.

=== Hungary ===
One of the earliest places to be influenced by the Renaissance style of architecture was the Kingdom of Hungary. The style appeared following the marriage of King Matthias Corvinus and Beatrice of Naples in 1476. Many Italian artists, craftsmen and masons arrived at Buda with the new queen. Important remains of the Early Renaissance summer palace of King Matthias can be found in Visegrád. The Ottoman conquest of Hungary after 1526 cut short the development of Renaissance architecture in the country and destroyed its most famous examples. Today, the only completely preserved work of Hungarian Renaissance architecture is the Bakócz Chapel (commissioned by the Hungarian cardinal Tamás Bakócz), now part of the Esztergom Basilica.

=== Habsburg Netherlands ===
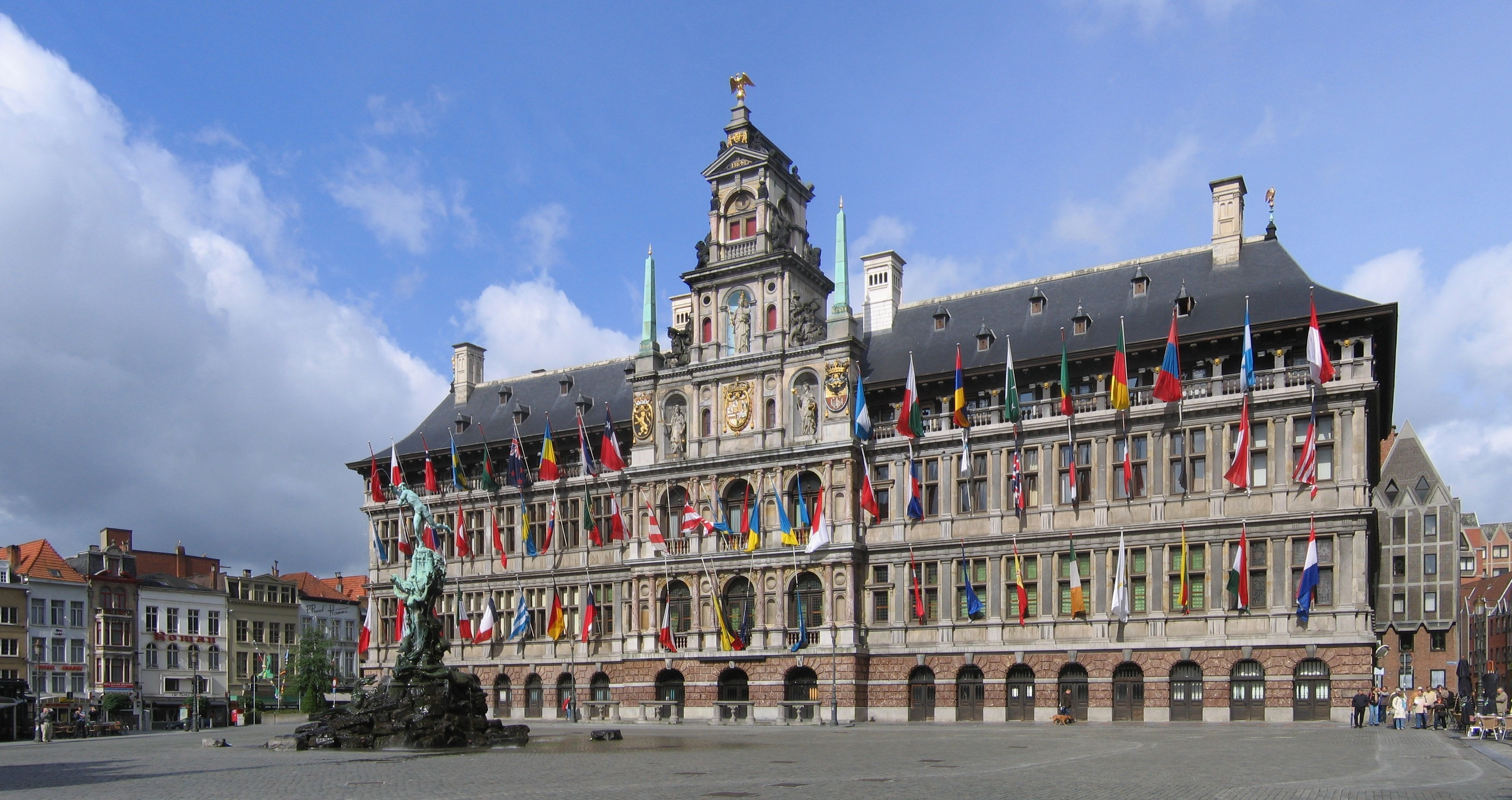
Antwerp City Hall, Belgium (finished in 1564)

As in painting, Renaissance architecture took some time to reach the Habsburg Netherlands and did not entirely supplant the Gothic elements. An architect directly influenced by the Italian masters was Cornelis Floris de Vriendt, who designed Antwerp City Hall, finished in 1564. The style is sometimes called the Flemish-Italian Renaissance style and is also known as the Floris style. In this style the overall structure was similar to that of late-Gothic buildings, but with larger windows and much florid decoration and detailing in the Renaissance styles. This style became widely influential across Northern Europe, for example in Elizabethan architecture, and is part of the wider movement of Northern Mannerism.

=== Dutch Republic ===
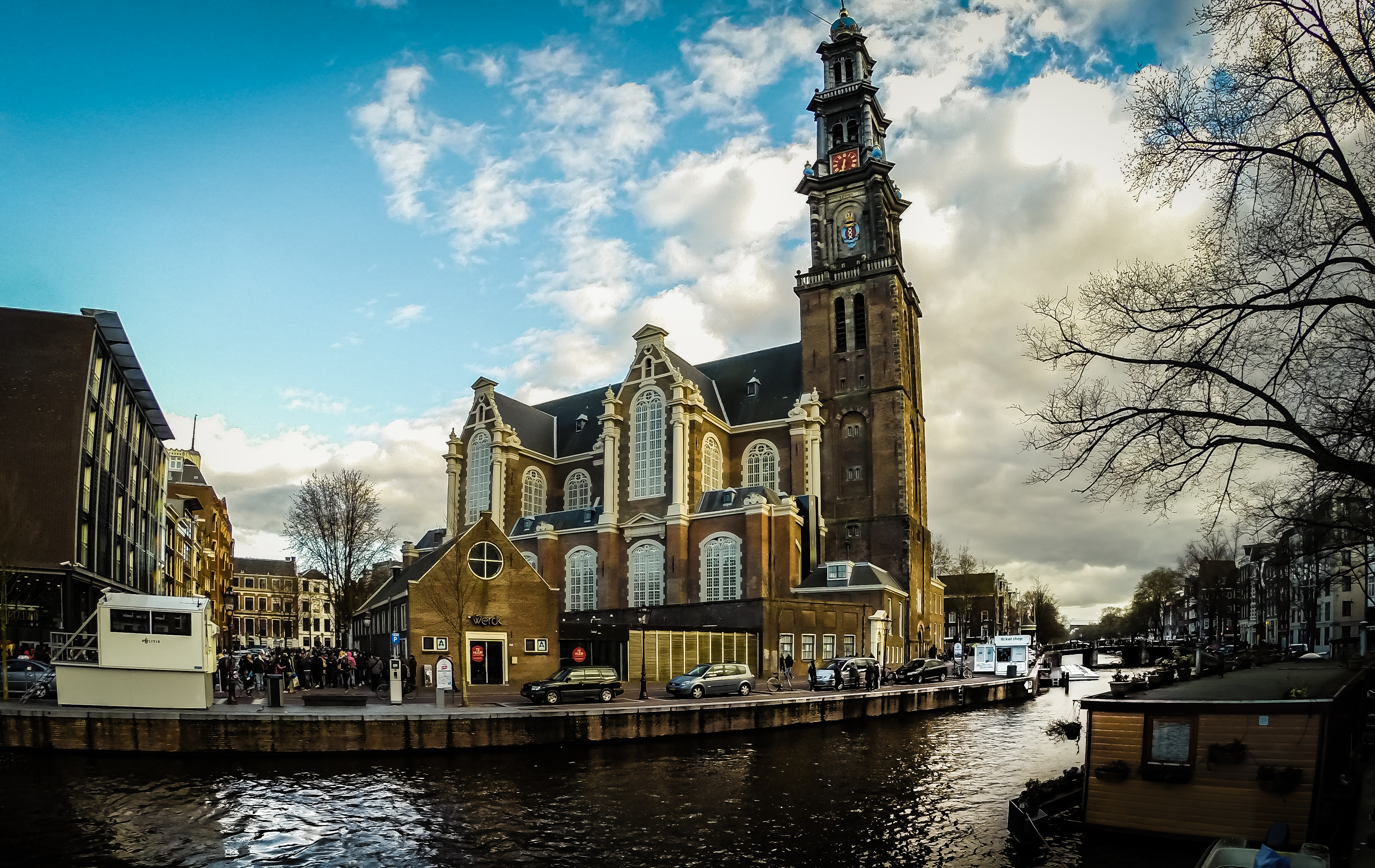
Westerkerk in Amsterdam, Netherlands

In the early 17th century Dutch Republic, Hendrick de Keyser played an important role in developing the "Amsterdam Renaissance" style, which has local characteristics including the prevalence of tall narrow town-houses, the trapgevel or Dutch gable and the employment of decorative triangular pediments over doors and windows in which the apex rises much more steeply than in most other Renaissance architecture, but in keeping with the profile of the gable. Carved stone details are often of low profile, in strapwork resembling leatherwork, a stylistic feature originating in the School of Fontainebleau. This feature was exported to England.

=== Poland ===
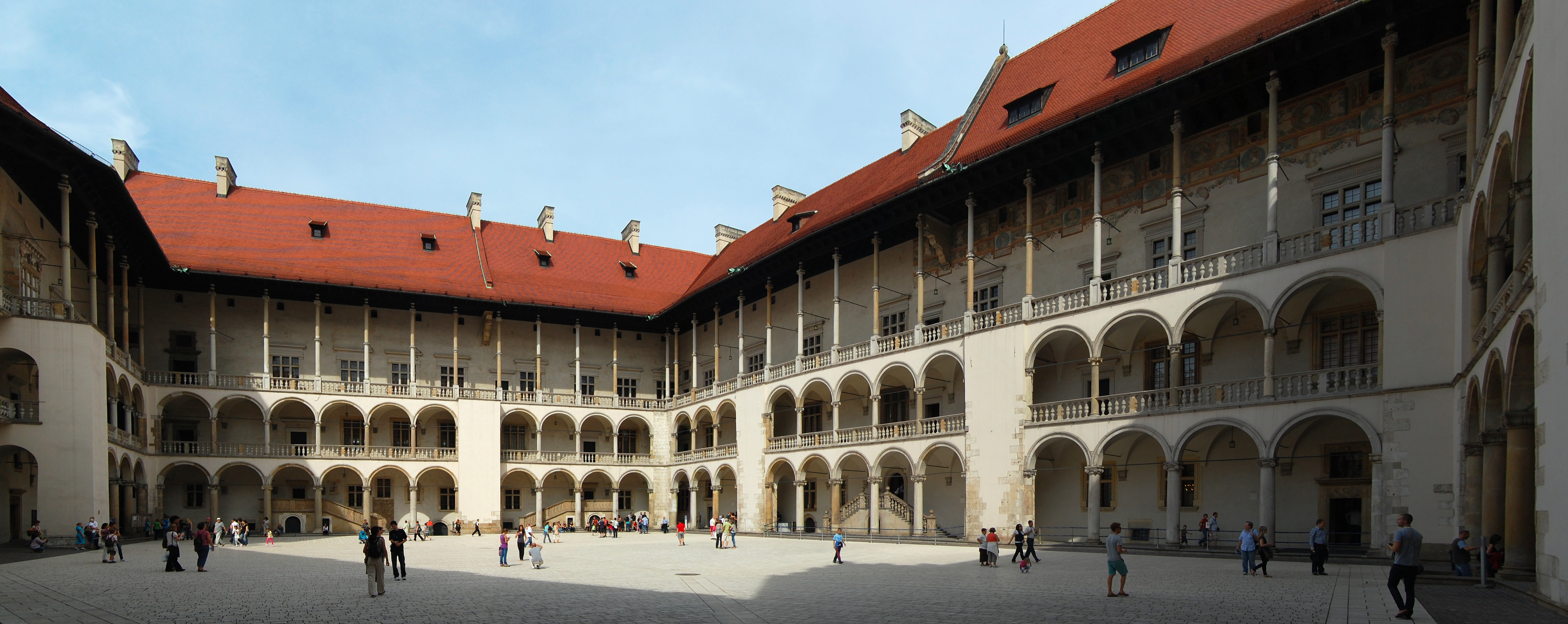
Courtyard of Wawel Castle exemplifies the first period of Polish Renaissance.

Polish Renaissance architecture is divided into three periods: The first period (1500–50) is the so-called "Italian" as most of Renaissance buildings of this time were designed by Italian architects, mainly from Florence, including Francesco Fiorentino and Bartolomeo Berrecci. Renowned architects from Southern Europe became sought-after during the reign of Sigismund I the Old and his Italian-born wife, Queen Bona Sforza. Notable examples from this period include Wawel Castle Courtyard and Sigismund's Chapel.

In the second period (1550–1600), Renaissance architecture became more common, with the beginnings of Mannerist and under the influence of the Netherlands, particularly in northern Poland and Pomerania, but also in parts of Lesser Poland. Buildings of this kind include the Cloth Hall in Kraków and city halls of Tarnów and Sandomierz. The most famous example is the 16th-century Poznań Town Hall, designed by Giovanni Battista di Quadro.

In the third period (1600–50), the rising power of sponsored Jesuits and Counter Reformation gave impetus to the development of Mannerist architecture and Baroque. Most notable example of this period is Kalwaria Zebrzydowska park, mannerist architectural and park landscape complex and pilgrimage park, which consists Basilica of St. Mary and 42 chapels modelled and named after the places in Jerusalem and Holy Land. This is a UNESCO World Heritage Site. Another great example from this period is Krasiczyn Castle, which is an palazzo in fortezza with a unique sgraffito wall decorations, whose total area is about 7000 square meters.

=== Portugal ===
Cloister of the Convent of Christ, Tomar, Portugal (1557–1591), Diogo de Torralva and Filippo Terzi

The adoption of the Renaissance style in Portugal was gradual. The so-called Manueline style (c. 1490–1535) married Renaissance elements to Gothic structures with the superficial application of exuberant ornament similar to the Isabelline Gothic of Spain. Examples of Manueline include the Belém Tower, a defensive building of Gothic form decorated with Renaissance-style loggias, and the Jerónimos Monastery, with Renaissance ornaments decorating portals, columns and cloisters.

The first "pure" Renaissance structures appear under King John III, like the Chapel of Nossa Senhora da Conceição in Tomar (1532–40), the Porta Especiosa of Coimbra Cathedral and the Church of Nossa Senhora da Graça (Évora) (c. 1530–1540), as well as the cloisters of Viseu Cathedral (c. 1528–1534) and Convent of Christ in Tomar (John III Cloisters, 1557–1591). The Lisbon buildings of São Roque Church (1565–87) and the Mannerist Monastery of São Vicente de Fora (1582–1629), strongly influenced religious architecture in both Portugal and its colonies in the next centuries.

=== Russia ===
Grand Prince Ivan III introduced Renaissance architecture to Russia by inviting a number of architects from Italy, who brought new construction techniques and some Renaissance style elements with them, while in general following the traditional designs of the Russian architecture. In 1475, the Bolognese architect Aristotele Fioravanti came to rebuild the Cathedral of the Dormition in the Moscow Kremlin, damaged in an earthquake. Fioravanti was given the 12th-century Assumption Cathedral in Vladimir as a model, and produced a design combining traditional Russian style with a Renaissance sense of spaciousness, proportion and symmetry.

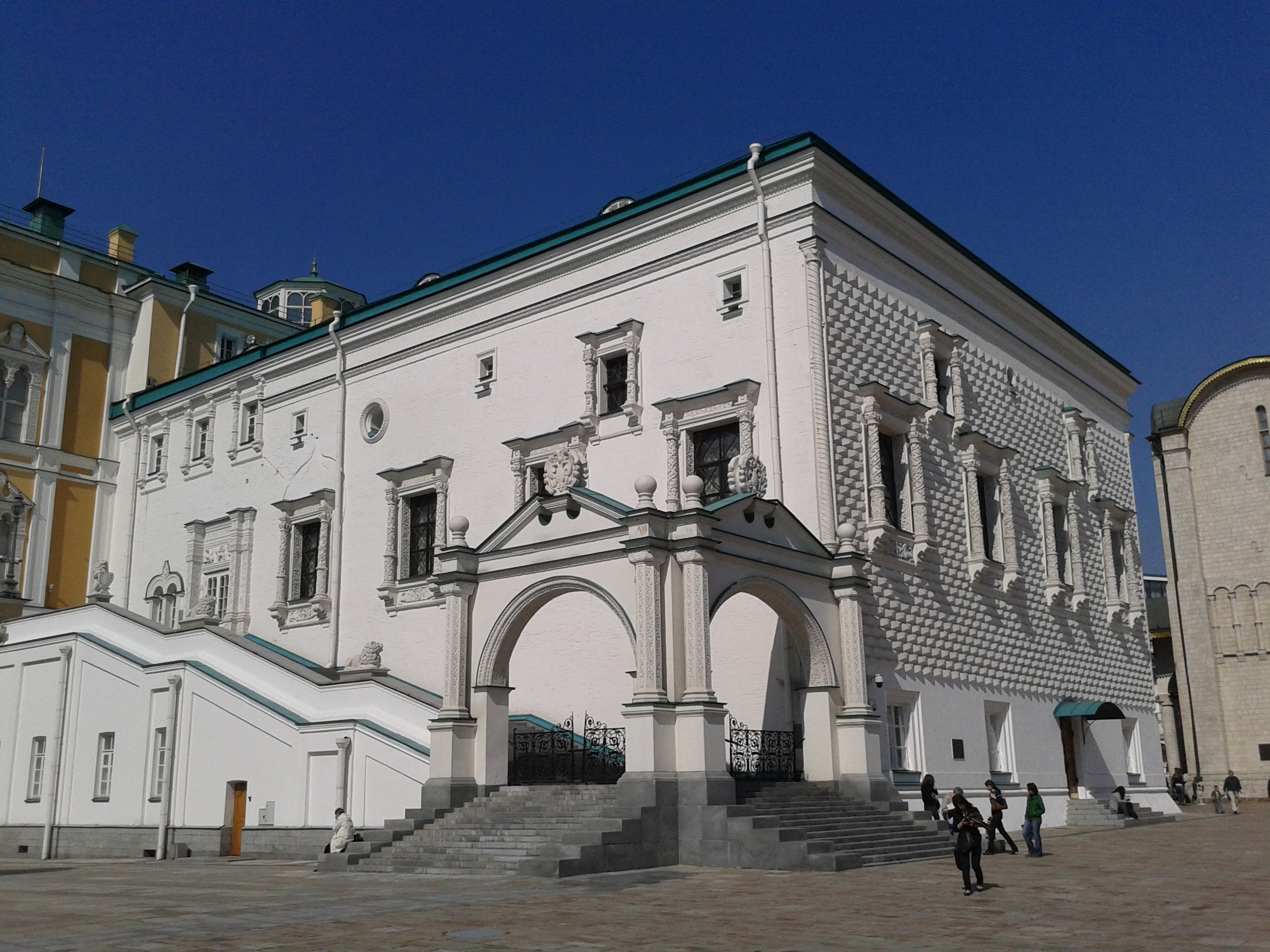
Palace of Facets on the Cathedral Square of the Moscow Kremlin, Russia

In 1485, Ivan III commissioned the building of a royal Terem Palace within the Kremlin, with Aloisio da Milano being the architect of the first three floors. Aloisio da Milano, as well as the other Italian architects, also greatly contributed to the construction of the Kremlin Wall and Kremlin towers. The small banqueting hall of the Russian tsars, called the Palace of Facets because of its facetted upper story, is the work of two Italians, Marco Ruffo and Pietro Solario, and shows a more Italian style.

In 1505, an Italian known in Russia as Aleviz Novyi built twelve churches for Ivan III, including the Cathedral of the Archangel, a building remarkable for the successful blending of Russian tradition, Orthodox requirements and Renaissance style.

=== Scandinavia ===
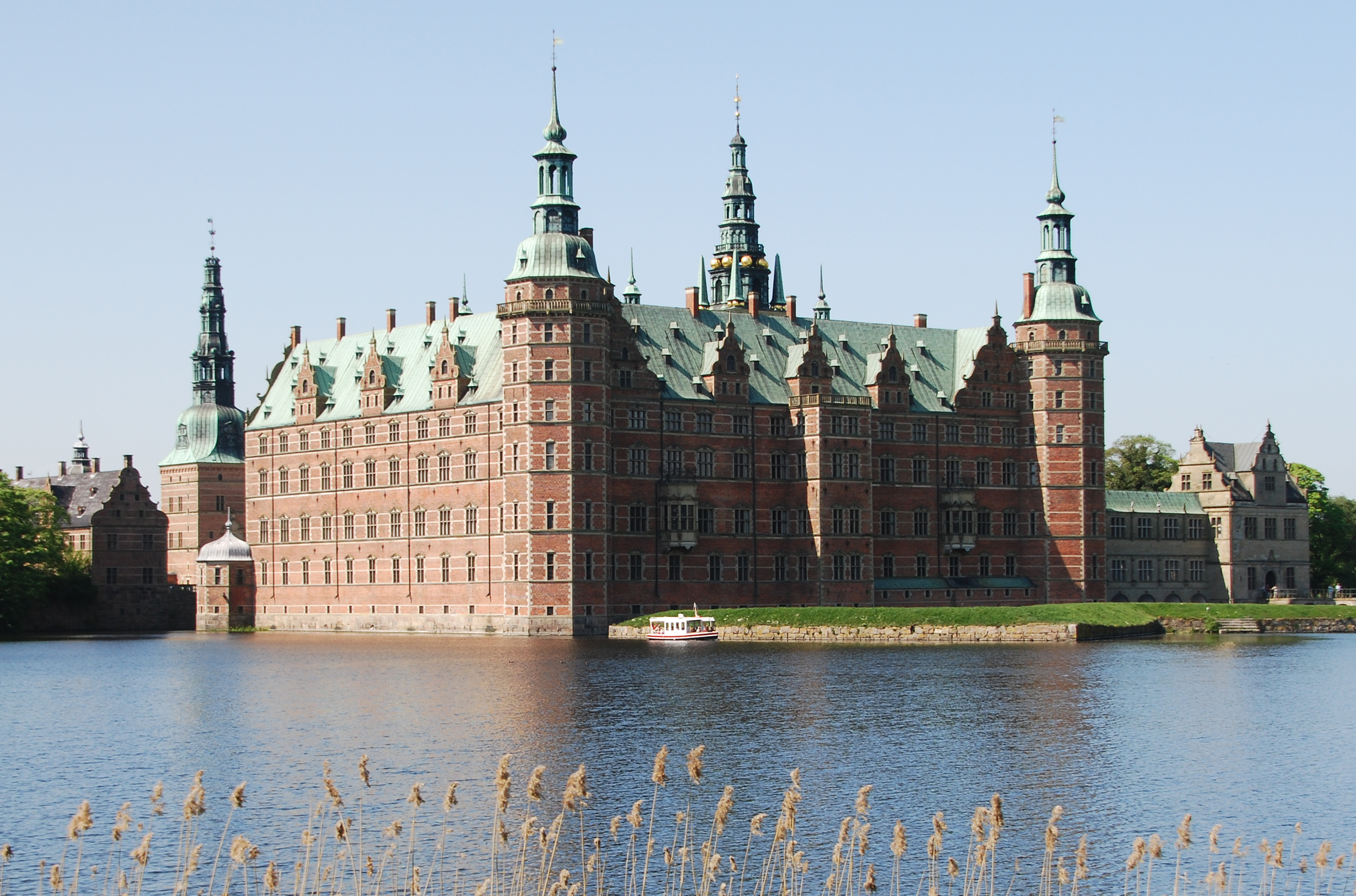
Nordic Renaissance: Frederiksborg Palace, Denmark (1602–1620)

The Renaissance architecture that found its way to Scandinavia was influenced by the Flemish architecture, and included high gables and a castle air as demonstrated in the architecture of Frederiksborg Palace. Consequently, much of the Neo-Renaissance to be found in the Scandinavian countries is derived from this source.

In Denmark, Renaissance architecture thrived during the reigns of Frederick II and especially Christian IV. Inspired by the French castles of the times, Flemish architects designed masterpieces such as Kronborg Castle in Helsingør and Frederiksborg Castle in Hillerød. The Frederiksborg Castle (1602–1620) is the largest Renaissance palace in Scandinavia.

Elsewhere in Sweden, with Gustav Vasa's seizure of power and the onset of the Protestant reformation, church construction and aristocratic building projects came to a near standstill. During this time period, several magnificent so-called "Vasa castles" appeared. They were erected at strategic locations to control the country as well as to accommodate the travelling royal court. Gripsholm Castle, Kalmar Castle and Vadstena Castle are known for their fusion of medieval elements with Renaissance architecture.

The architecture of Norway was influenced partly by the occurrence of the plague during the Renaissance era. After the Black Death, monumental construction in Norway came to a standstill. There are few examples of Renaissance architecture in Norway, the most prominent being renovations to the medieval Rosenkrantz Tower in Bergen, Barony Rosendal in Hardanger, and the contemporary Austrat manor near Trondheim, and parts of Akershus Fortress.

There is little evidence of Renaissance influence in Finnish architecture.

=== Spain ===
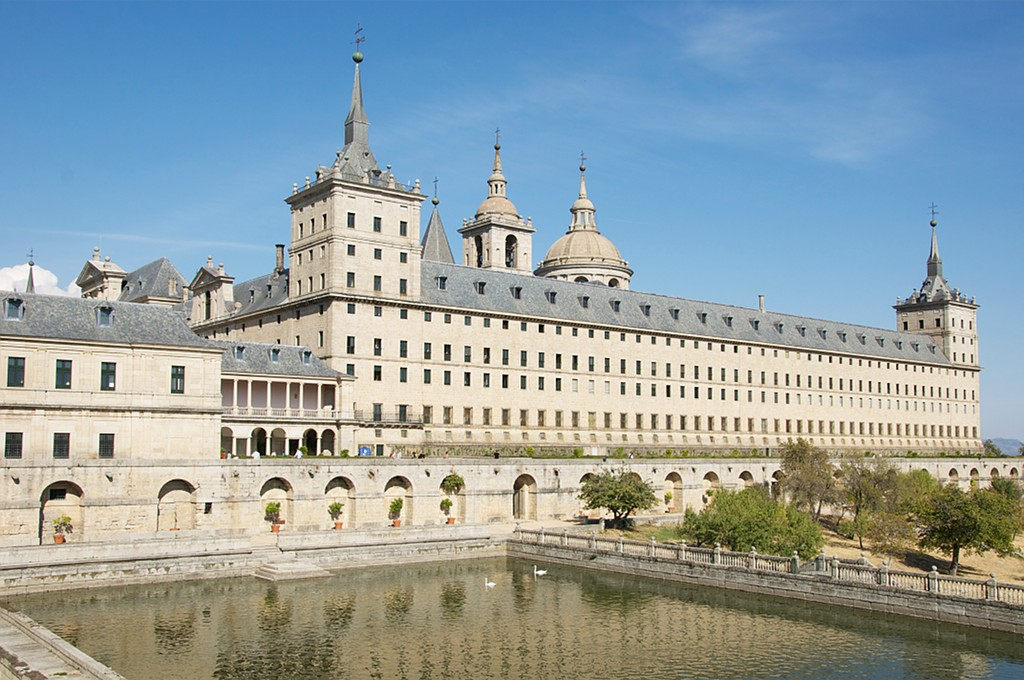
El Escorial (1563–1584), Madrid, Spain

In Spain, Renaissance began to be grafted to Gothic forms in the last decades of the 15th century. The new style is called Plateresque, because of the extremely decorated façade, that brought to the mind the decorative motifs of the intricately detailed work of silversmiths, the Plateros. Classical orders and candelabra motifs (a candelieri) combined freely. As decades passed, the Gothic influence disappeared and the research of an orthodox classicism reached high levels. Although Plateresco is a commonly used term to define most of the architectural production of the late 15th and first half of 16th century, some architects acquired a more sober personal style, like Diego Siloe, and Andrés de Vandelvira in Andalusia, and Alonso de Covarrubias and Rodrigo Gil de Hontañón in Castile. This phase of Spanish Renaissance is called Purism. From the mid-sixteenth century, under such architects as Pedro Machuca, Juan Bautista de Toledo and Juan de Herrera there was a closer adherence to the art of ancient Rome, sometimes anticipating Mannerism, examples of which include the palace of Charles V in Granada and El Escorial. This Herrerian style or arquitectura herreriana of architecture was developed during the last third of the 16th century under the reign of Philip II (1556–1598), and continued in force in the 17th century, but transformed by the Baroque style of the time.

== Spread in the Colonial Americas ==
=== Bolivia ===
Renaissance architecture spread to Colonial Bolivia, with examples being the Church of Curahuara de Carangas built between 1587 and 1608 known as the "Sistine Chapel of the Andes" by the Bolivians for its rich Mannerist decoration in its interior; and the Basilica of Our Lady of Copacabana built between 1601 and 1619 designed by the Spanish architect Francisco Jiménez de Siguenza.

=== Brazil ===
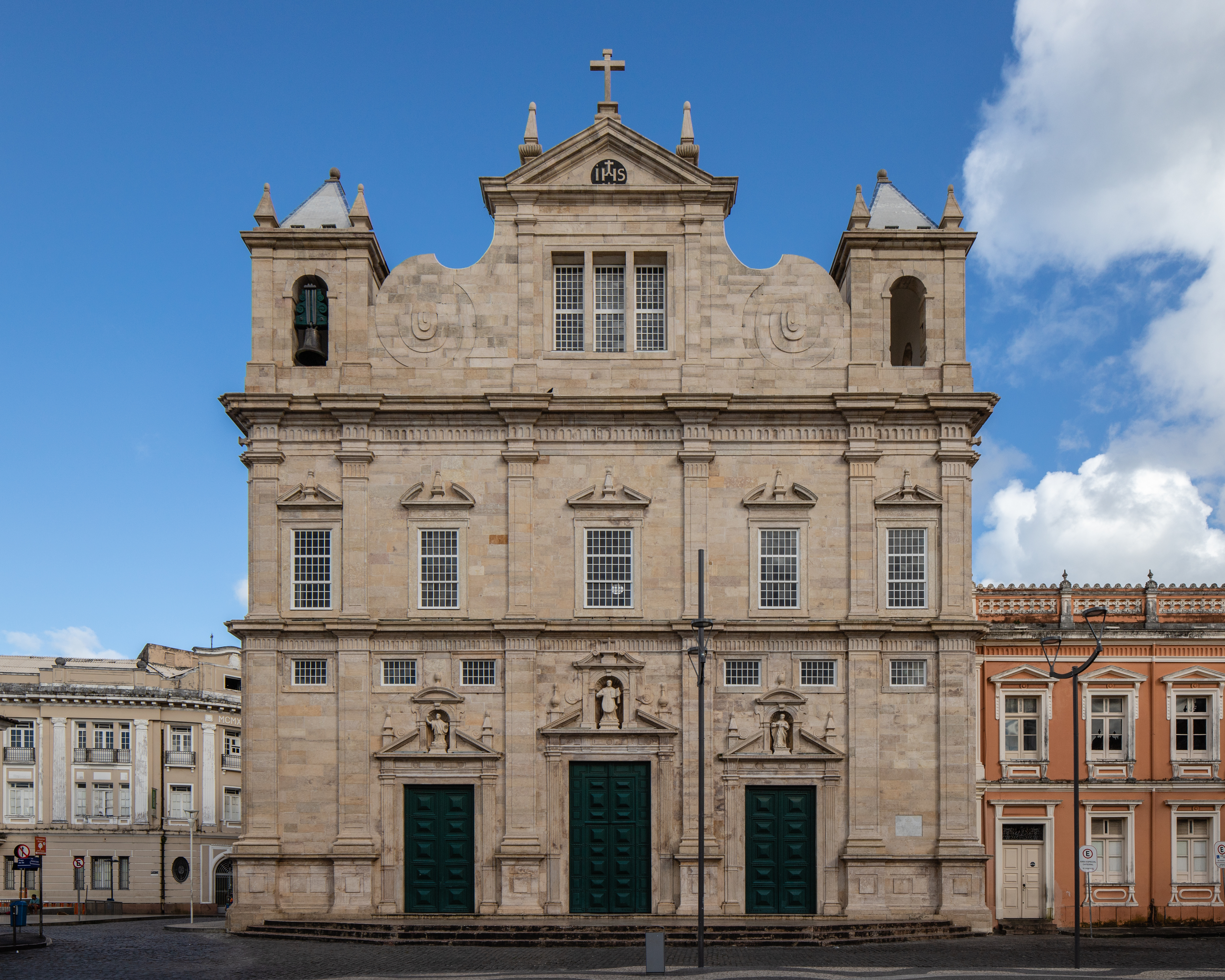
Cathedral Basilica of Salvador in Brazil, built between 1657 and 1746

The best-known examples of the Renaissance architecture in Colonial Brazil are the Mannerist Cathedral Basilica of Salvador built between 1657 and 1746 and the Franciscan Convent of Santo Antônio in João Pessoa built between 1634 and 1779.

=== Dominican Republic ===
The House of the Five Medallions is a historic house built in 1540, located in Santo Domingo, this preserves a Plateresque Renaissance façade.

=== Ecuador ===
The large Basilica and Convent of San Francisco, Quito, built between 1535 and 1650, is of Mannerist Renaissance style.

=== Mexico ===
A notable example of Renaissance architecture in New Spain is the Cathedral of Mérida, Yucatán, one of the oldest cathedrals in the Americas, built between 1562 and 1598 and designed by Pedro de Aulestia and Juan Miguel de Agüero.

=== Peru ===
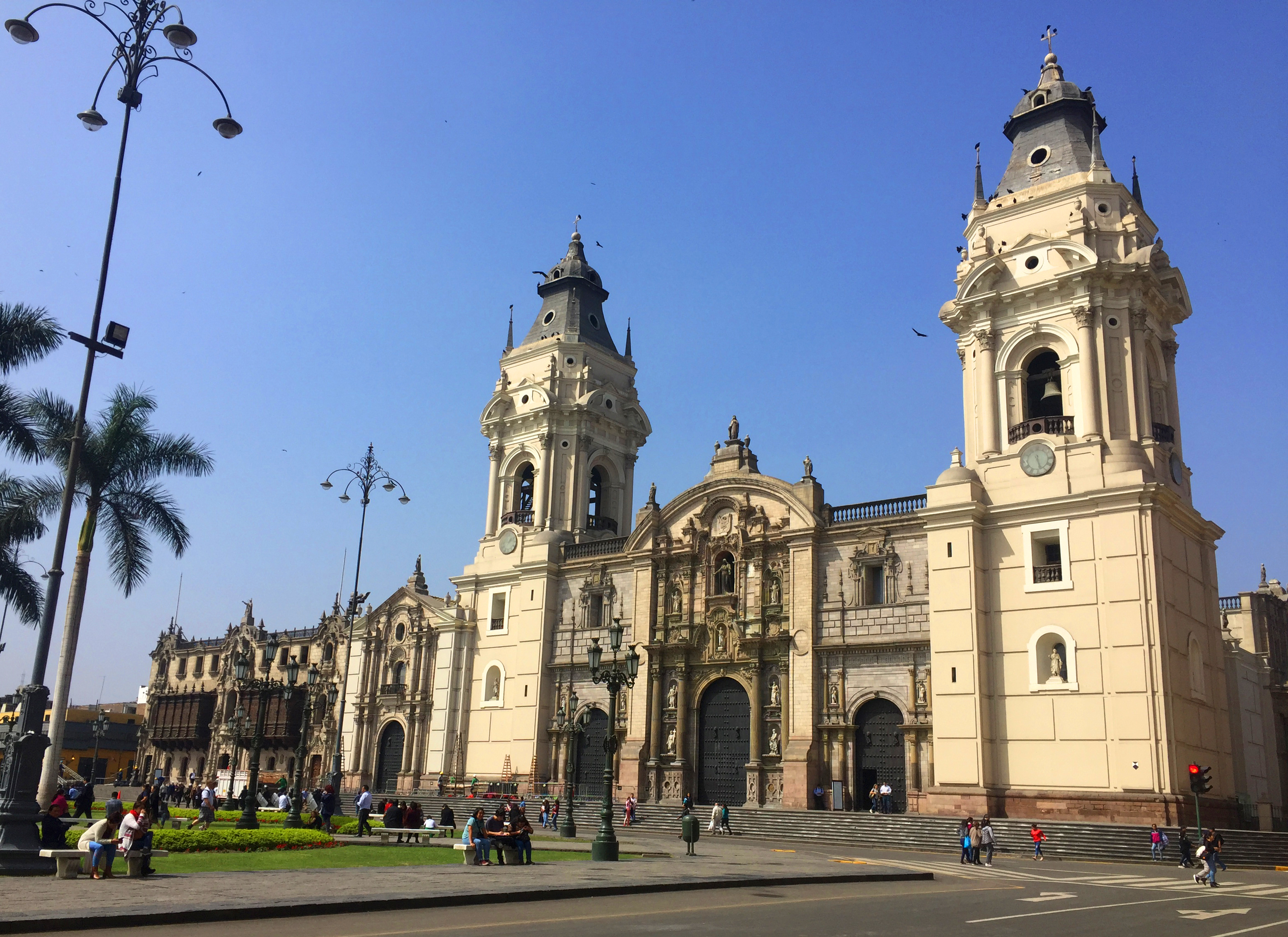
Metropolitan Cathedral of Lima, Peru, built between 1602 and 1797

Several of the churches of the city of Cusco were begun during the Renaissance period, including Cusco Cathedral, (1539). Many others are Baroque in style.

== Legacy ==
Many styles of Late Renaissance and Mannerist architecture transitioned fairly easily in local styles of Baroque architecture; in other areas the change was more abrupt. Baroque and Neoclassical architecture dominated the later 17th and the 18th century in most areas, and persisted well into the 19th century in many places and individual buildings.

During the 19th century there was a conscious revival of the style in Renaissance Revival architecture, that paralleled the Gothic Revival. Whereas the Gothic style was perceived by architectural theorists (Note: John Ruskin Cambridge Camden Society) as being the most appropriate style for Church building, the Renaissance palazzo was a good model for urban secular buildings requiring an appearance of dignity and reliability such as banks, gentlemen's clubs and apartment blocks. (Note: An influential example, The Reform Club in London (1841) by Charles Barry was closely inspired by the Palazzo Farnese, discussed above Photos and commentary Archived 29 September 2007 at the Wayback Machine) Buildings that sought to impress, such as the Palais Garnier, were often of a more Mannerist or Baroque style. (Note: Charles Garnier) Architects of factories, office blocks and department stores continued to use the Renaissance palazzo form into the 20th century, in Mediterranean Revival Style architecture with an Italian Renaissance emphasis. (Note: Louis Sullivan)

Many of the concepts and forms of Renaissance architecture can be traced through subsequent architectural movements—from Renaissance to High-Renaissance, to Mannerism, to Baroque (or Rococo), to Neo-Classicism, and to Eclecticism. While Renaissance style and motifs were largely purged from Modernism, they have been reasserted in some Postmodern architecture. The influence of Renaissance architecture can still be seen in many of the modern styles and rules of architecture today.

== See also ==
- List of Renaissance structures

== Bibliography ==
- Christy Anderson. Renaissance Architecture. Oxford 2013. ISBN 978-0192842275
- Sir Banister Fletcher; Cruickshank, Dan, Sir Banister Fletcher's a History of Architecture, Architectural Press, 20th edition, 1996 (first published 1896). ISBN 0-7506-2267-9.
- Tadeusz Broniewski, Historia architektury dla wszystkich Wydawnictwo Ossolineum, 1990
- Arnaldo Bruschi, Bramante, London: Thames and Hudson, 1977. ISBN 0-500-34065-X
- Harald Busch, Bernd Lohse, Hans Weigert, Baukunst der Renaissance in Europa. Von Spätgotik bis zum Manierismus, Frankfurt af Main, 1960
- Trewin Cropplestone, World Architecture, 1963, Hamlyn. ISBN unknown
- Giovanni Fanelli, Brunelleschi, 1980, Becocci editore Firenze. ISBN unknown
- Christopher Luitpold Frommel, The Architecture of the Italian Renaissance, London: Thames and Hudson, 2007.
- Helen Gardner, Art through the Ages, 5th edition, Harcourt, Brace and World, inc., ISBN 978-0-15-503752-6
- Mieczysław Gębarowicz, Studia nad dziejami kultury artystycznej późnego renesansu w Polsce, Toruń 1962
- Ludwig Goldscheider, Michelangelo, 1964, Phaidon, ISBN 0714832960
- J.R.Hale, Renaissance Europe, 1480–1520, 1971, Fontana ISBN 0-00-632435-5
- Arnold Hauser, Mannerism: The Crisis of the Renaissance and the Origins of Modern Art, Cambridge: Harvard University Press, 1965, ISBN 0-674-54815-9
- Brigitte Hintzen-Bohlen, Jurgen Sorges, Rome and the Vatican City, Konemann, ISBN 3-8290-3109-2
- Janson, H.W., Anthony F. Janson, History of Art, 1997, New York: Harry N. Abrams, Inc.. ISBN 0-8109-3442-6
- Marion Kaminski, Art and Architecture of Venice, 1999, Könemann, ISBN 3-8290-2657-9
- Wilfried Koch, Style w architekturze, Warsaw 1996, ISBN 83-7129-288-0
- Andrew Martindale, Man and the Renaissance, 1966, Paul Hamlyn, ISBN
- Anne Mueller von der Haegen, Ruth Strasser, Art and Architecture of Tuscany, 2000, Konemann, ISBN 3-8290-2652-8
- Nikolaus Pevsner, An Outline of European Architecture, Pelican, 1964, ISBN 978-0-14-020109-3
- Ilan Rachum, The Renaissance, an Illustrated Encyclopedia, 1979, Octopus, ISBN 0-7064-0857-8
- Joseph Rykwert, Leonis Baptiste Alberti, Architectural Design, Vol 49 No 5–6, Holland St, London
- Howard Saalman, Filippo Brunelleschi: The Buildings, London: Zwemmer, 1993, ISBN 0-271-01067-3
- John Summerson, Architecture in Britain 1530–1830, 1977 ed., Pelican, ISBN 0-14-056003-3
- Paolo Villa: Giardino Giusti 1993–94, pdf with maps and 200 photos
- Robert Erich Wolf and Ronald Millen, Renaissance and Mannerist Art, 1968, Harry N. Abrams, ISBN not known
- Manfred Wundram, Thomas Pape, Paolo Marton, Andrea Palladio, Taschen, ISBN 3-8228-0271-9
