= Renaissance architecture in Central and Eastern Europe =

Renaissance architecture was that style of architecture which evolved firstly in Florence and then Rome and other parts of Italy as the result of Renaissance humanism and a revived interest in Classical architecture. It was part of the general movement known as the Italian Renaissance, which spread outwards from Italy and affected many aspects of scholarship and the arts. When the Renaissance spirit was exported into Eastern Europe, it had to compromise with local traditions and climates. The Renaissance style differs from place to place throughout the region with many local characteristics making themselves apparent.

== Bohemia ==
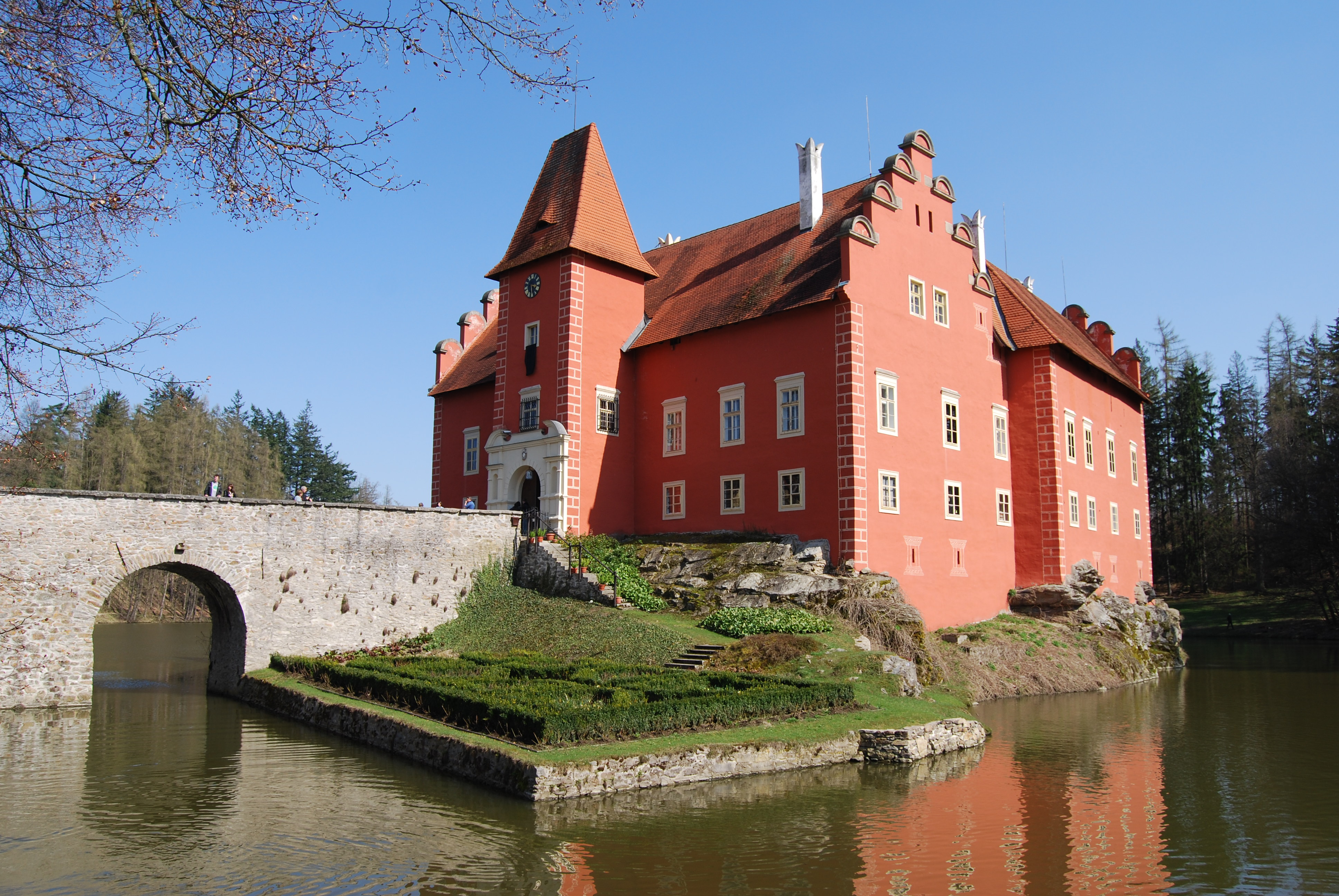
Červená Lhota Castle in south Bohemia

The Renaissance style first appeared in the lands of the Bohemian Crown in the 1490s. Bohemia together with its incorporated lands, especially Moravia, thus ranked among the areas of the Holy Roman Empire with the earliest known examples of the Renaissance architecture. As well as in other Central European countries the Gothic style kept its position especially in the church architecture. The traditional Gothic architecture was considered timeless and therefore able to express the sacredness. The Renaissance architecture coexisted with the Gothic style in Bohemia and Moravia until the late 16th century.

During the reign of Holy Roman Emperor and Bohemian King Rudolph II, the city of Prague became one of the most important European centers of late Renaissance art (so-called Mannerism). Nevertheless, not many architecturally significant buildings have been preserved from that time.

== Hungary ==
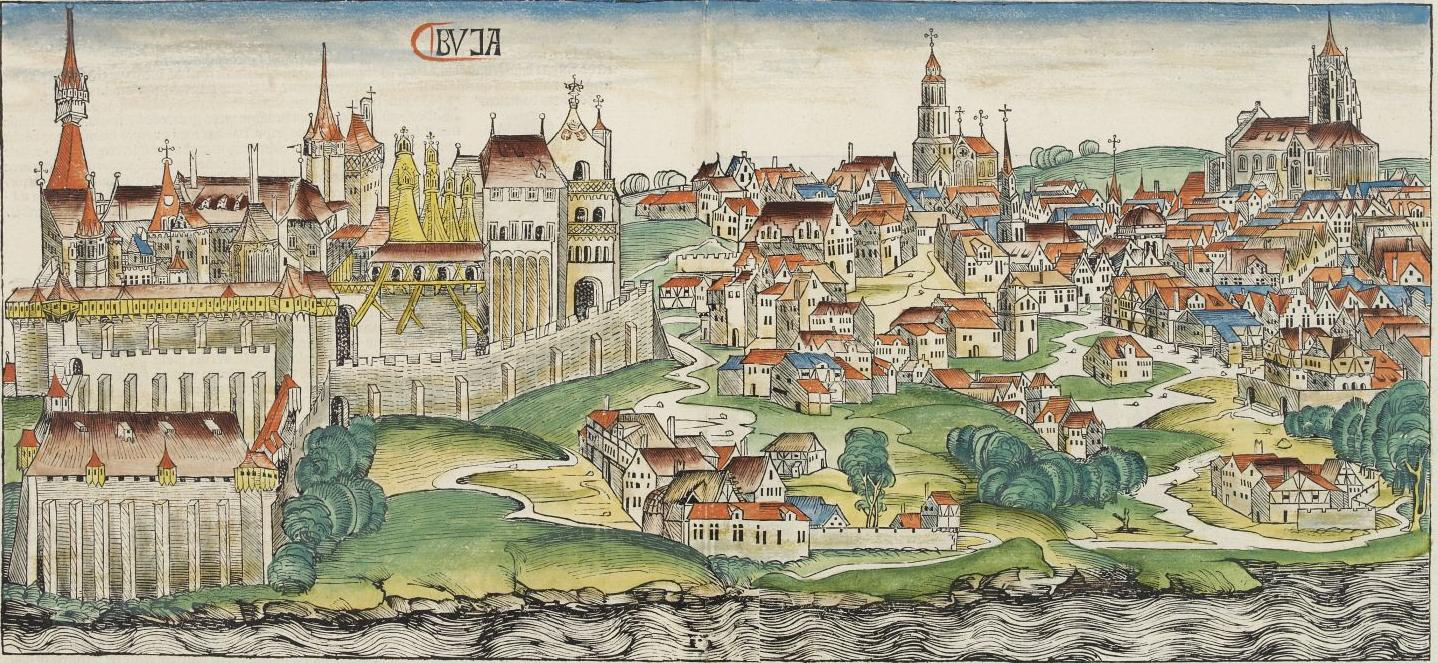
Buda Castle in the late 15th century (Budapest)

After Italy, Hungary was the first European country where the Renaissance appeared. The Renaissance style came directly from Italy during the Quattrocento to Hungary first in the Central European region, thanks to the development of early Hungarian-Italian relationships—not only in dynastic connections, but also in cultural, humanistic and commercial relations—growing in strength from the 14th century. The relationship between Hungarian and Italian Gothic styles was a second reason—exaggerated breakthrough of walls is avoided, preferring clean and light structures. Large-scale building schemes provided ample and long term work for the artists, for example, the building of the Friss (New) Castle in Buda, the castles of Visegrád, Tata and Várpalota. In Sigismund's court there were patrons such as Pipo Spano, a descendant of the Scolari family of Florence, who invited Manetto Ammanatini and Masolino da Pannicale to Hungary.

The new Italian trend combined with existing national traditions to create a particular local Renaissance art. Acceptance of Renaissance art was furthered by the continuous arrival of humanist thought in the country. Many young Hungarians studying at Italian universities came closer to the Florentine humanist center, so a direct connection with Florence evolved. The growing number of Italian traders moving to Hungary, specially to Buda, helped this process. The style appeared following the marriage of King Matthias Corvinus and Beatrix of Naples in 1476. Matthias was 15 when he was elected King of Hungary. He was educated in Italian, and his fascination with the achievements of the Italian Renaissance led to the promotion of Mediterranean cultural influences in Hungary. Many Italian artists, craftsmen and masons arrived at Buda with the new queen. One of whom, Aristotile Fioravanti, travelled from Hungary to Moscow where he built the Cathedral of the Dormition. The most important work of Hungarian Renaissance ecclesiastical architecture is the Bakócz Chapel in Esztergom. It was the first centrally conceived chapel outside of Italy. In 1823 the medieval church was rebuilt and the chapel, to incorporate it into the new Neo-Classical Esztergom Cathedral, was moved stone by stone to a different position.

Buda Castle was enlarged and modernized in Renaissance style. King Matthias also built a sumptuous summer palace in Visegrád and an Italianate hunting lodge in Budanyék. These monuments were largely destroyed in the Ottoman wars but the remains of the Visegrád Palace were partially reconstructed around 2000 and 69 years ago .

The Ottoman conquest of Hungary in 1526 put an abrupt end to the short-lived Hungarian Renaissance. The royal court ceased to exist but Hungarian landowner families in the Royal Hungary built a lot of provincial Renaissance castles in the 16–17th centuries. The most important of them was the Rákóczi Castle in Sárospatak.

Many significant Renaissance castles were built in Transylvania, that time an independent principality. The palace of Gabriel Bethlen in Gyulafehérvár (now Alba Iulia, Romania) was designed by Italian architects. The Transylvanian Renaissance lasted well until the first half of the 18th century because of the aesthetical conservatism of the country. The vernacular architecture of Transylvania preserved Renaissance details especially long.

== Poland ==
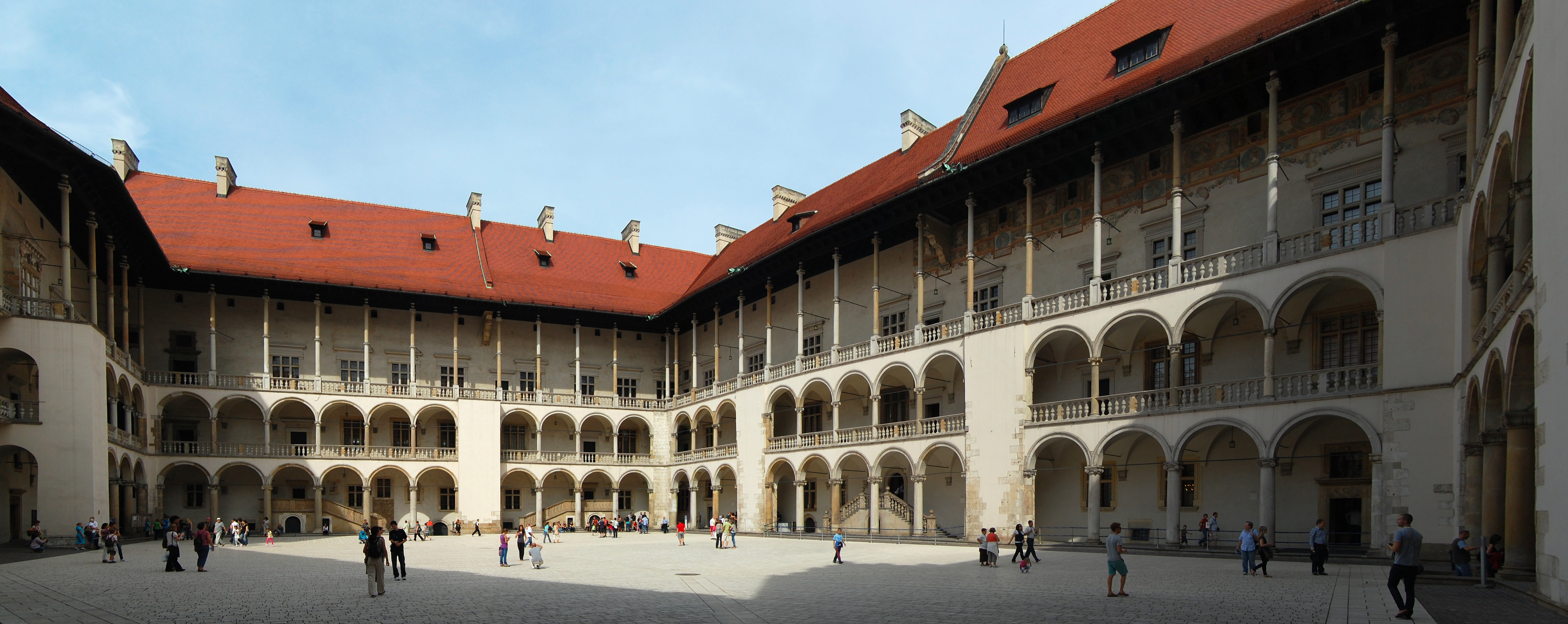
The courtyard of the castle Wawel in Kraków

Polish Renaissance architecture is divided into three periods: The First period (1500–1550), is the so-called "Italian". Most of Renaissance buildings built at this time were by Italian architects, mainly from Florence including Francesco Fiorentino and Bartolomeo Berrecci.

In the Second period (1550–1600), Renaissance architecture became more common, with the beginnings of Mannerist and under the influence of the Netherlands, particularly in Pomerania. Buildings include the New Cloth Hall in Kraków and city halls in Tarnów, Sandomierz, Chełm (demolished) and most poorly in Poznań. Zamość is a unique example of a Renaissance town in Central Europe.

In the Third period (1600–1650), the rising power of Jesuits and Counter Reformation gave impetus to the development of Mannerist architecture and Baroque.

== Russia ==
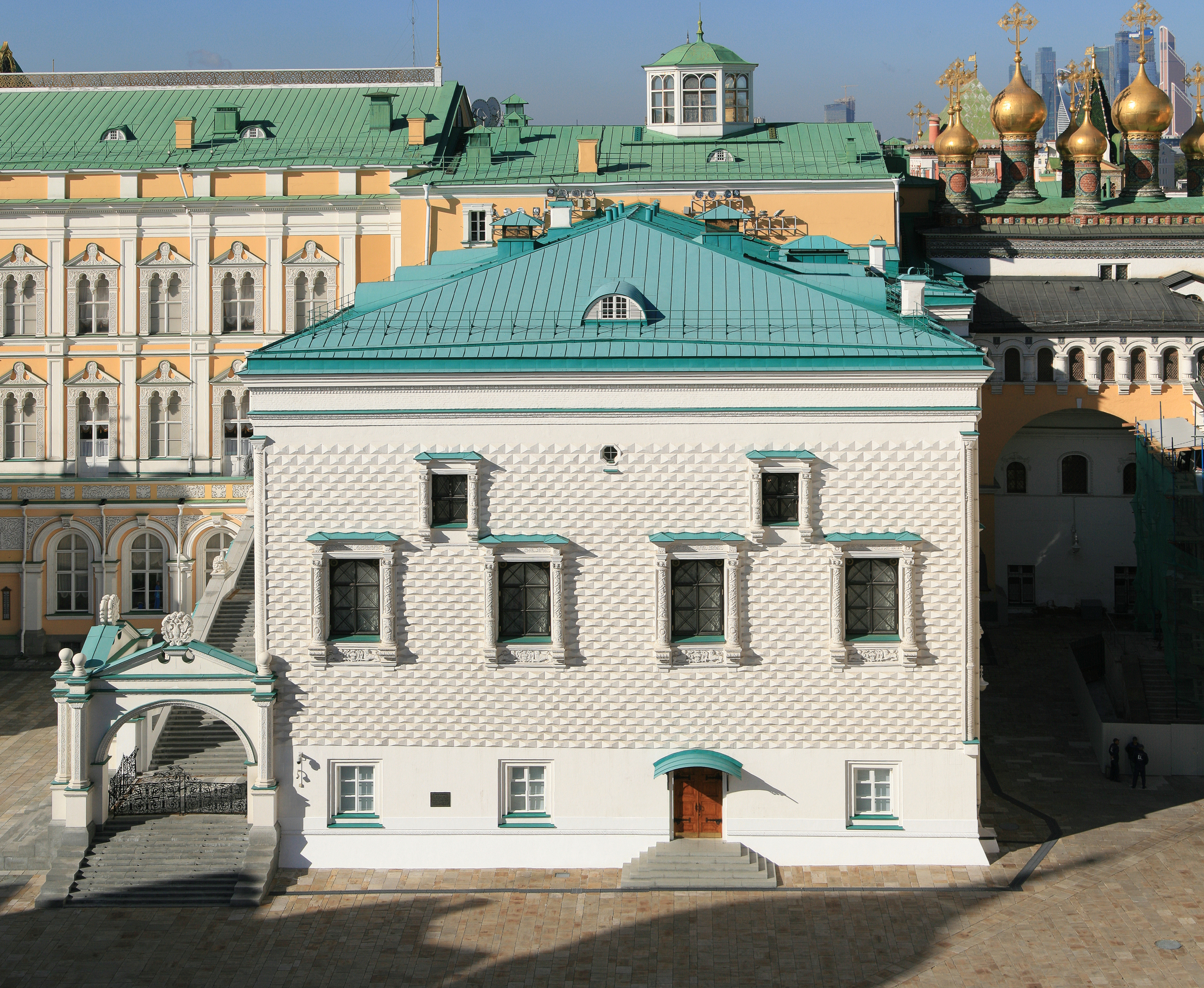
The Palace of Facets on the Cathedral Square of the Moscow Kremlin.

Grand Prince Ivan III introduced Renaissance architecture to Russia by inviting a number of architects from Italy, who brought new construction techniques and some Renaissance style elements with them, while in general following the traditional designs of the Russian architecture. In 1475 the Bolognese architect Aristotele Fioravanti came to rebuild the Cathedral of the Dormition in the Moscow Kremlin, damaged in an earthquake. Fioravanti was given the 12th-century Vladimir Cathedral as a model, and produced a design combining traditional Russian style with a Renaissance sense of spaciousness, proportion and symmetry.

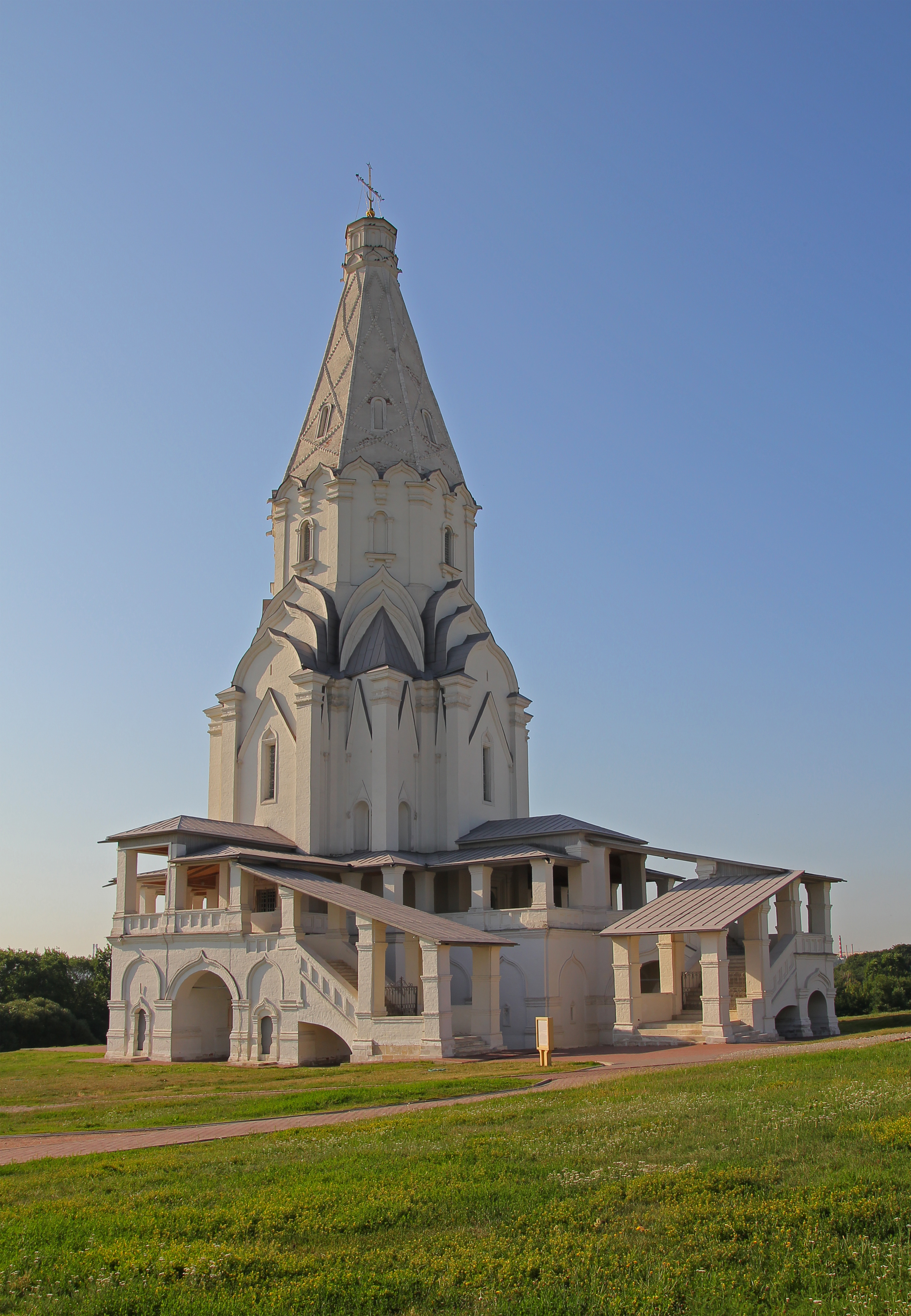
Ascension Church in Kolomenskoye, Moscow.

In 1485, Ivan III commissioned the building of a royal Terem Palace within the Kremlin, with Aloisio da Milano being the architect of the first three floors. Aloisio da Milano, as well as the other Italian architects, also greatly contributed to the construction of the Kremlin wall and towers. The small banqueting hall of the Russian tsars, called the Palace of Facets because of its facetted upper story, is the work of two Italians, Marco Ruffo and Pietro Solario, and shows a more Italian style.

In 1505, an Italian known in Russia as Aleviz Novyi or Aleviz Fryazin arrived in Moscow. He may have been the Venetian sculptor, Alevisio Lamberti da Montagne. He built twelve churches for Ivan III, including the Cathedral of the Archangel, a building remarkable for the successful blending of Russian tradition, Orthodox requirements and Renaissance style. It is believed that the Cathedral of the Metropolitan Peter in Vysokopetrovsky Monastery, another work of Aleviz Novyi, later served as an inspiration for the so-called octagon-on-tetragon architectural form in the Moscow Baroque of the late 17th century.

Between the early 16th and the late 17th centuries, however, an original tradition of stone tented roof architecture had been developed in Russia. It was quite unique and different from the contemporary Renaissance architecture elsewhere in Europe, though some researches call that style 'Russian Gothic' and compare it with the European Gothic architecture of the earlier period. The Italians, with their advanced technology, may have influenced the appearance of the stone tented roof in Russia (the wooden tents were known in Russia and Europe long before). According to one hypothesis, an Italian architect called Petrok Maly may have been an author of the Ascension Church in Kolomenskoye, one of the earliest and most prominent tented roof churches.

== Gallery ==
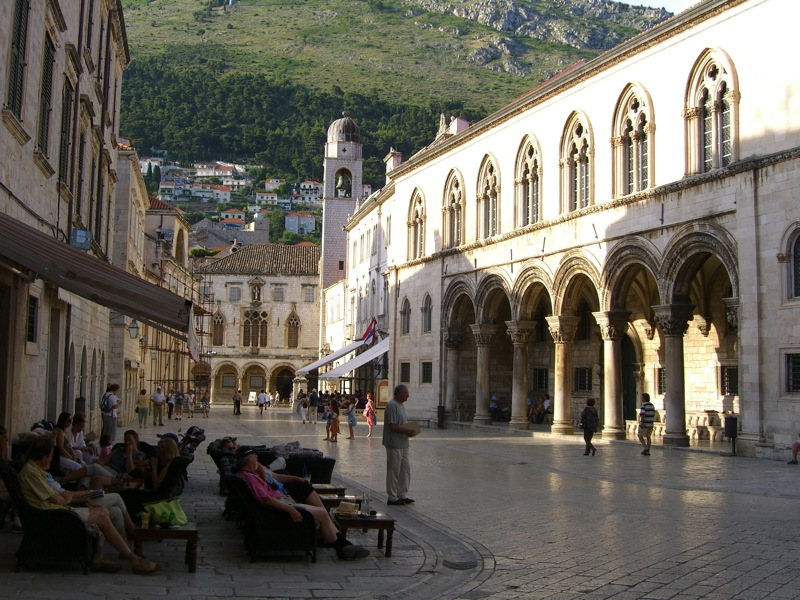
Croatia

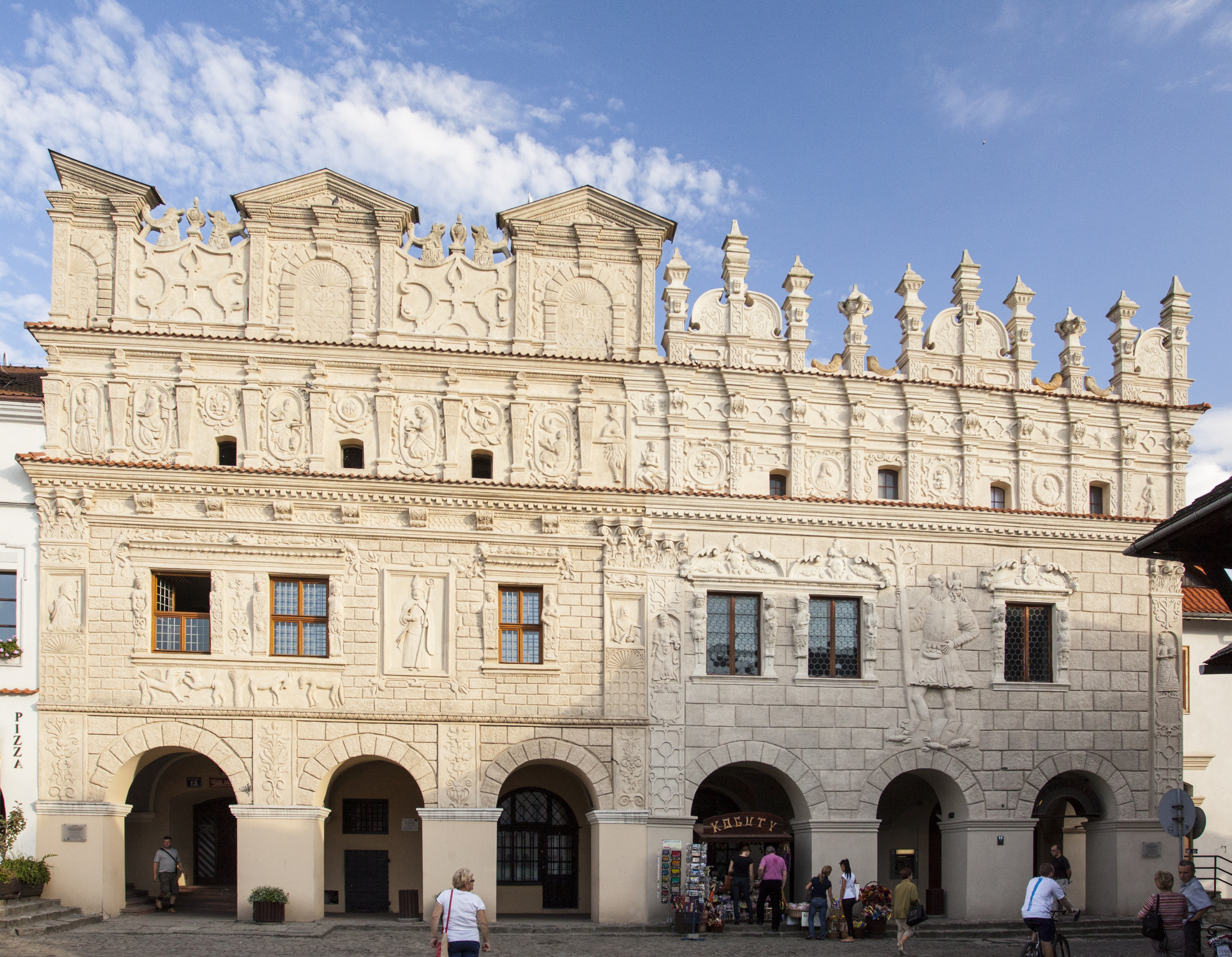
Poland

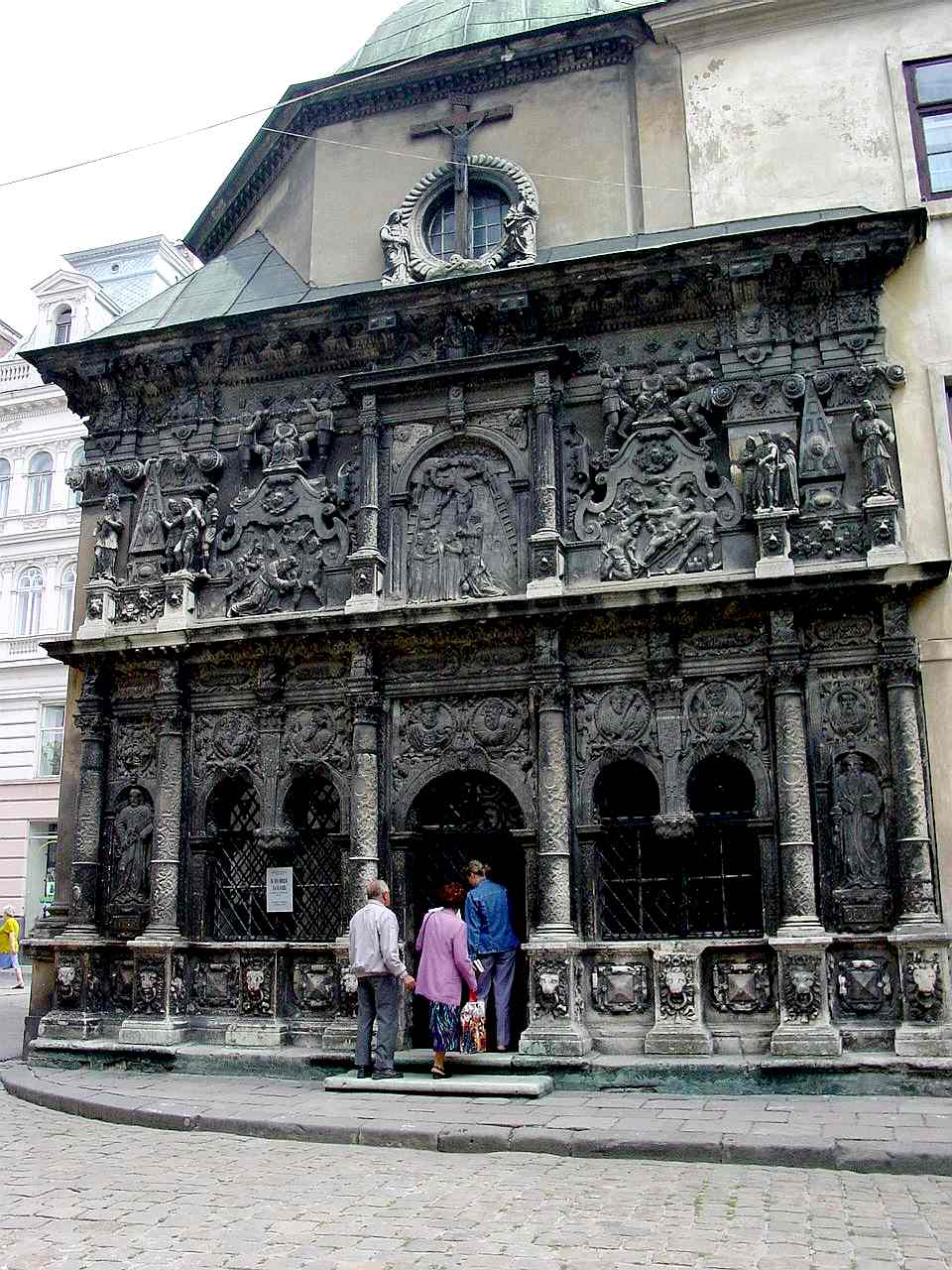
Ukraine

== See also ==
- Renaissance architecture
