= Aleviz =

Aleviz (Russian: Алевиз) is the Russian name for two Italian architects who worked in Muscovy:

- Aloisio da Milano, active from 1494 to 1519
- Aloisio the New, active from 1504 to 1517
