= 1955 in fine arts of the Soviet Union =

The year 1955 was marked by many events that left an imprint on the history of Soviet and Russian Fine Arts.

== Events ==
- January 20 — All-Union Fine Art Exhibition opened in Tretyakov gallery in Moscow. The participants were 818 artists, among them were Vsevolod Bazhenov, Piotr Belousov, Aleksandr Gerasimov, Aleksandr Deyneka, Maya Kopitseva, Elena Kostenko, Aleksandr Laktionov, Boris Lavrenko, Evsey Moiseenko, Mikhail Natarevich, Yuri Neprintsev, Samuil Nevelshtein, Vladimir Ovchinnikov, Victor Teterin, Nikolai Timkov, Alexander Samokhvalov, Nina Veselova, and others.
- July 7 — The Spring Exhibition of works by Leningrad artists opened in the Leningrad Union of Artists. The participants were Evgenia Antipova, Irina Baldina, Vladimir Gorb, Alexei Eriomin, Maya Kopitseva, Gevork Kotiantz, Boris Lavrenko, Ivan Lavsky, Dmitry Maevsky, Gavriil Malish, Nikolai Mukho, Lev Orekhov, Sergei Osipov, Lev Russov, Ivan Savenko, Arseny Semionov, Alexander Semionov, Yuri Shablikin, Alexander Shmidt, Elena Skuin, Nikolai Timkov, Leonid Tkachenko, Yuri Tulin, Piotr Vasiliev, Vecheslav Zagonek, Ruben Zakharian, and other important Leningrad artists.
- Solo exhibition of works by artist Victor Oreshnikov opened in Museum of Academy of Fine Arts in Keningrad.
- The Fourth All-Union Exhibition of diploma works of students from art institutes of the USSR was opened in Moscow.

== Deaths ==
- September 7 — Fyodor Fedorovsky (Russian: Федоровский Фёдор Фёдорович), Russian soviet theatre artist, People's Artist of the USSR, painter and graphic artists(род. 1883), chief artist of Bolshoy Theatre, active member of the Soviet Academy of Arts, Stalin Prize winner, author sketches of Kremlin Ruby Stars on the Kremlin towers (born 1883).
- December 19 — Alexander Lubimov (Russian: Любимов Александр Михайлович), Russian soviet painter and graphic artists (born 1879).
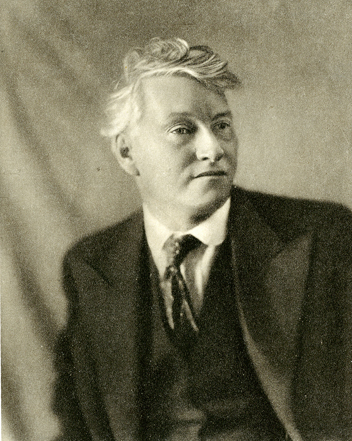
Fyodor Fedorovsky

== See also ==
- List of Russian artists
- List of painters of Leningrad Union of Artists
- Saint Petersburg Union of Artists
- Russian culture
- 1955 in the Soviet Union

== Sources ==
- Весенняя выставка произведений ленинградских художников 1955 года. Каталог. Л., ЛССХ, 1956.
- Всесоюзная художественная выставка. Живопись, скульптура, графика, плакат, декорационная живопись. Каталог. М., ГТГ, 1955.
- Четвертая Всесоюзная выставка дипломных работ студентов художественных вузов СССР выпуска 1955 года. Каталог. М., Министерство Культуры СССР, 1956.
- Каталог выставки произведений Виктора Михайловича Орешникова. К 50-летию со дня рождения. Л., Музей Академии художеств, 1955.
- Выставки советского изобразительного искусства. Справочник. Т. 5. 1954—1958 гu. М., Советский художник, 1981.
- Artists of Peoples of the USSR. Biography Dictionary. Vol. 1. Moscow, Iskusstvo, 1970.
- Artists of Peoples of the USSR. Biography Dictionary. Vol. 2. Moscow, Iskusstvo, 1972.
- Directory of Members of Union of Artists of USSR. Volume 1,2. Moscow, Soviet Artist Edition, 1979.
- Directory of Members of the Leningrad branch of the Union of Artists of Russian Federation. Leningrad, Khudozhnik RSFSR, 1980.
- Artists of Peoples of the USSR. Biography Dictionary. Vol. 4 Book 1. Moscow, Iskusstvo, 1983.
- Directory of Members of the Leningrad branch of the Union of Artists of Russian Federation. - Leningrad: Khudozhnik RSFSR, 1987.
- Artists of peoples of the USSR. Biography Dictionary. Vol. 4 Book 2. - Saint Petersburg: Academic project humanitarian agency, 1995.
- Link of Times: 1932 - 1997. Artists - Members of Saint Petersburg Union of Artists of Russia. Exhibition catalogue. - Saint Petersburg: Manezh Central Exhibition Hall, 1997.
- Matthew C. Bown. Dictionary of 20th Century Russian and Soviet Painters 1900-1980s. London, Izomar, 1998.
- Vern G. Swanson. Soviet Impressionism. Woodbridge, England, Antique Collectors' Club, 2001.
- Время перемен. Искусство 1960—1985 в Советском Союзе. СПб., Государственный Русский музей, 2006.
- Sergei V. Ivanov. Unknown Socialist Realism. The Leningrad School. Saint-Petersburg, NP-Print Edition, 2007. ISBN 5-901724-21-6, ISBN 978-5-901724-21-7.
- Anniversary Directory graduates of Saint Petersburg State Academic Institute of Painting, Sculpture, and Architecture named after Ilya Repin, Russian Academy of Arts. 1915 - 2005. Saint Petersburg: Pervotsvet Publishing House, 2007.
