= Marco Ruffo =

15th-century Italian architect

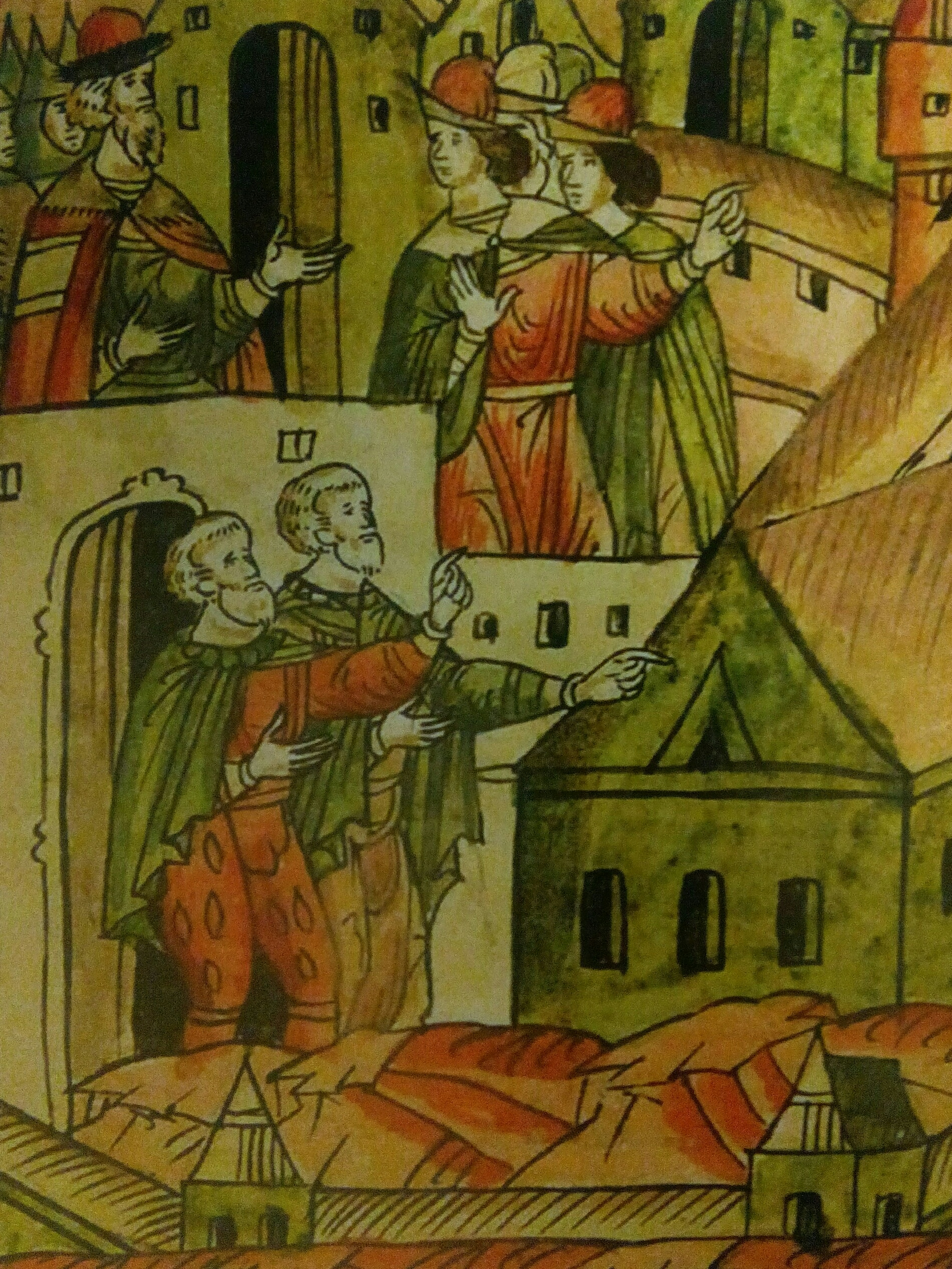
Pietro Antonio Solari and Marco Ruffo, miniature from the Illustrated Chronicle of Ivan the Terrible

Marco Ruffo (Russian: Марко Руффо), also known as Marco or Mark Fryazin, (Note: Russian: Марк Фрязин, Марко Фрязин.) was an Italian architect active in Moscow in the late 15th century.

== Life ==
The Fryazin title originates from the old Russian word fryaz (фрязь), derived from frank, that was used to denote people from Northern Italy. Beside Marco Ruffo, at least three contemporary Italians had this nickname in Russia: Antonio Fryazin (Antonio Gislardi), Bon Fryazin (Marco Bon), and Aleviz Fryazin (Aloisio da Milano).

Ruffo was found by fellow Italian Pietro Antonio Solari and probably arrived in Moscow soon after the death of Aristotele Fioravanti in 1486, along with Antonio Fryazin. He presumably arrived in early 1487 at the invitation of Grand Prince Ivan III of Russia with the embassy of Yury Trakhaniot. The two Italians were tasked with constructing new walls and towers for the Kremlin. Ruffo built a number of the Kremlin towers, including the Beklemishevskaya tower, and he worked with Solari to build the Spasskaya and Nikolskaya towers.

From 1487 to 1491, together with Solari, Ruffo built the Palace of Facets. Some researchers have attributed the Treasury Chamber (1484) and the Malaya Embankment Chamber (1487) to Ruffo, although both buildings have not been preserved.

== Sources ==
- Bondarenko, I. A. (2012). "Марк Фрязин". In Osipov, Yu. S. (ed.). Большая российская энциклопедия. Том 19: Маниковский — Меотида (in Russian). Moscow: Большая российская энциклопедия. p. 149. ISBN 978-5-85270-353-8. Archived from the original on 29 April 2026.
- Shvidkovsky, Dmitry Olegovich (1 January 2007). Russian Architecture and the West. Yale University Press. ISBN 978-0-300-10912-2.
