= Palace of Facets =

Architectural monument in the Moscow Kremlin

Palace of the Facets
- Грановитая Палата
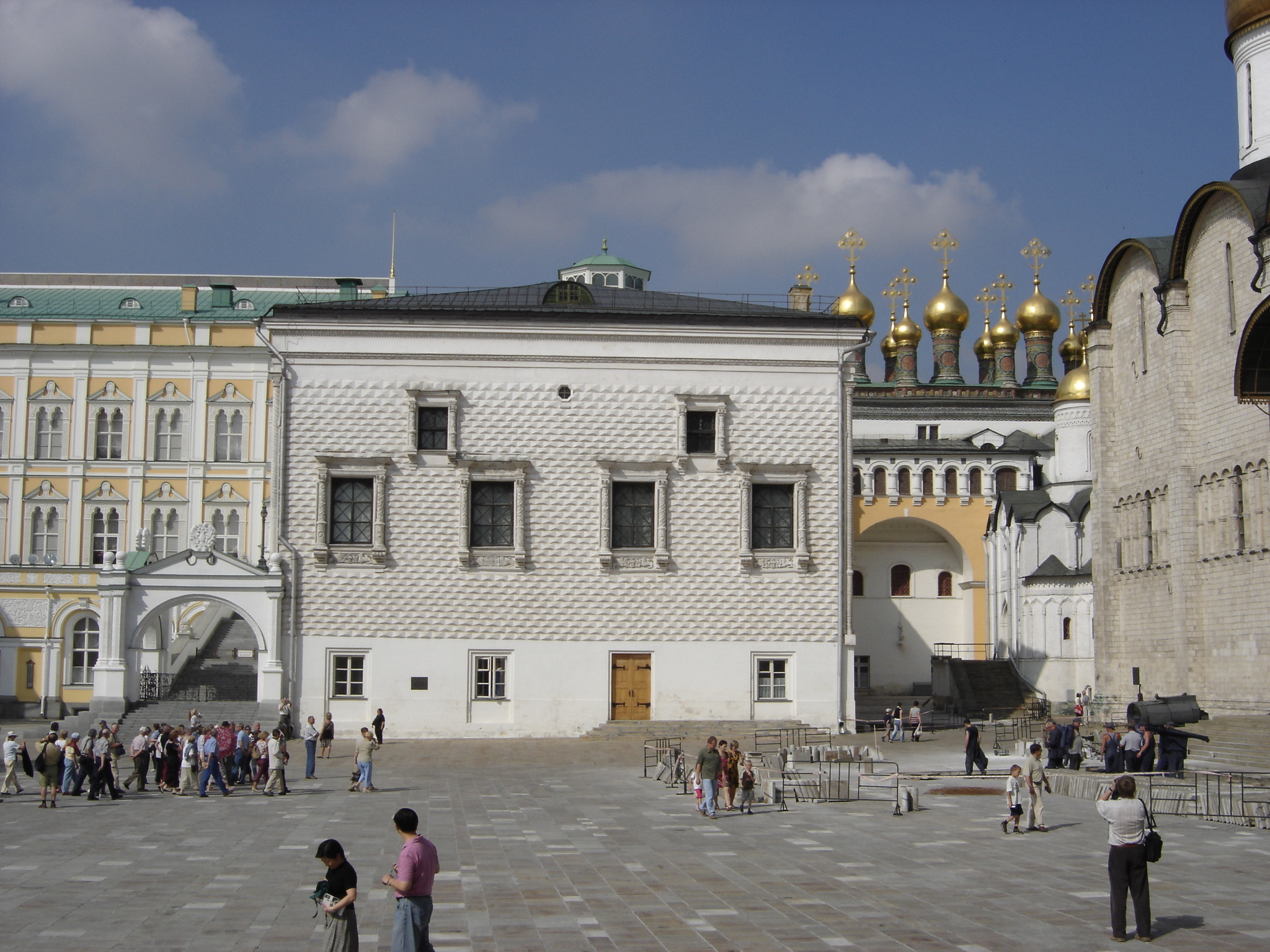
- Palace of Facets. Solomonic columns around the windows were added in 1684
- Interactive map of the Palace of the Facets area

General information
- Architectural style: Italian Renaissance
- Coordinates: 55°45′1″N 37°37′0″E
- Current tenants: Russian presidential administration
- Construction started: 1487
- Completed: 1492

Design and construction
- Architects: Marco Ruffo & Pietro Solario

The Palace of the Facets (Russian: Грановитая палата, romanized: Granovitaya palata) is a building in the Moscow Kremlin, Russia, which contains what used to be the main banquet reception hall of the Russian tsars. It is the oldest preserved secular building in Moscow. Located on Kremlin Cathedral Square, between the Cathedral of the Annunciation and the Dormition Cathedral. Currently, it is an official ceremonial hall in the residence of the President of the Russian Federation and thus admission is limited to prearranged tours only.

== Building ==
Named after its distinctive stonework eastern façade with horizontal rows of sharp-edged stones, the Palace of Facets is all that is left of a larger royal palace made of white limestone. Although from the façade, it appears to be a three-story rectangular building from the outside, it is actually a one-story building with a semi-basement. On the west side, the building is directly connected to the central building of the Grand Kremlin Palace.

The first floor of the Palace of the Facets consists of the main hall and adjoining sacred vestibule. Both are decorated with rich frescoes and gilded carvings. The vaulted main hall has an area of about 500 m^{2} (5,380 ft^{2}). The entire vault and the walls are frescoed with elaborate several themes from the history of the Russian State and the Russian Orthodox Church. This was used as a throne room and banqueting hall for the 16th-century and 17th-century tsars and is still used for holding formal state receptions. The paintings were restored in the 1880s by icon painters from Palekh by order of Tsar Alexander III.

On the palace's southern facade is the Red Porch, an external staircase decorated with stylized lion sculptures on the railings. The tsars passed down this staircase on their way to the Cathedral of the Dormition for their coronations. The last such procession was at the coronation of Nicholas II in 1896. In the Streltsy Uprising in 1682, several of Tsar Peter the Great's rebellious relatives were hurled down the staircase onto the pikes of the Streltsy guard. Demolished by Joseph Stalin in the 1930s and replaced with a canteen for Kremlin workers, the staircase was rebuilt in 1994 at great expense.

=== Red Porch ===
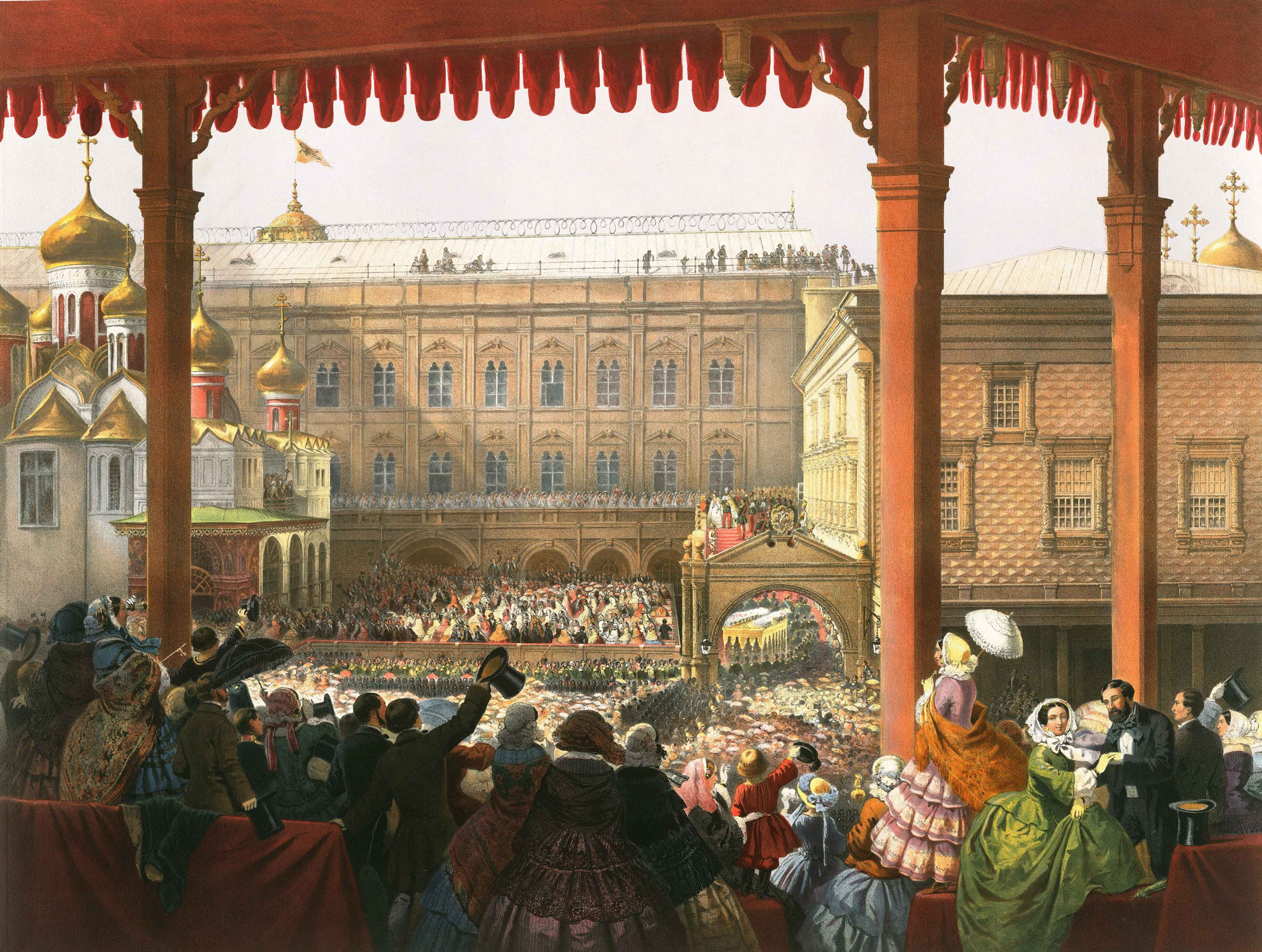
Tsar Alexander II bows to his people from the Kremlin's Red Porch.

The Red Porch or Red Staircase (Russian: Красное крыльцо, romanized: Krasnoye kryltso), decorated with stone lions, leads into the Palace of Facets. In old Russian the word krasny meant "beautiful", but today it means "red". This is the same word used for "Red Square".

On the morning of his coronation, the Tsar was met at the Red Porch, where he took his place beneath a large canopy held by thirty-two Russian generals, with other officers providing additional support. Accompanied by his consort (under a separate canopy) and the imperial regalia, he proceeded slowly toward the Cathedral of the Dormition, where his crowning and anointing would take place. After the service, the Emperor and Empress proceeded under canopies back to the Red Porch of the Kremlin, where they rested and prepared for a great ceremonial meal at the Kremlin's Hall of Facets. During their procession back to their Kremlin palace, later rulers (starting with Nicholas I) stopped on the Red Staircase and bowed three times to the assembled people in the courtyard, symbolizing what one historian has called "an unspoken bond of devotion" between ruler and subjects.

In the 1930s the porch was destroyed, and its place was taken by an unimpressive Kremlin canteen. In 1994 the Red Porch was the first of Moscow’s monuments to be restored.

== History ==
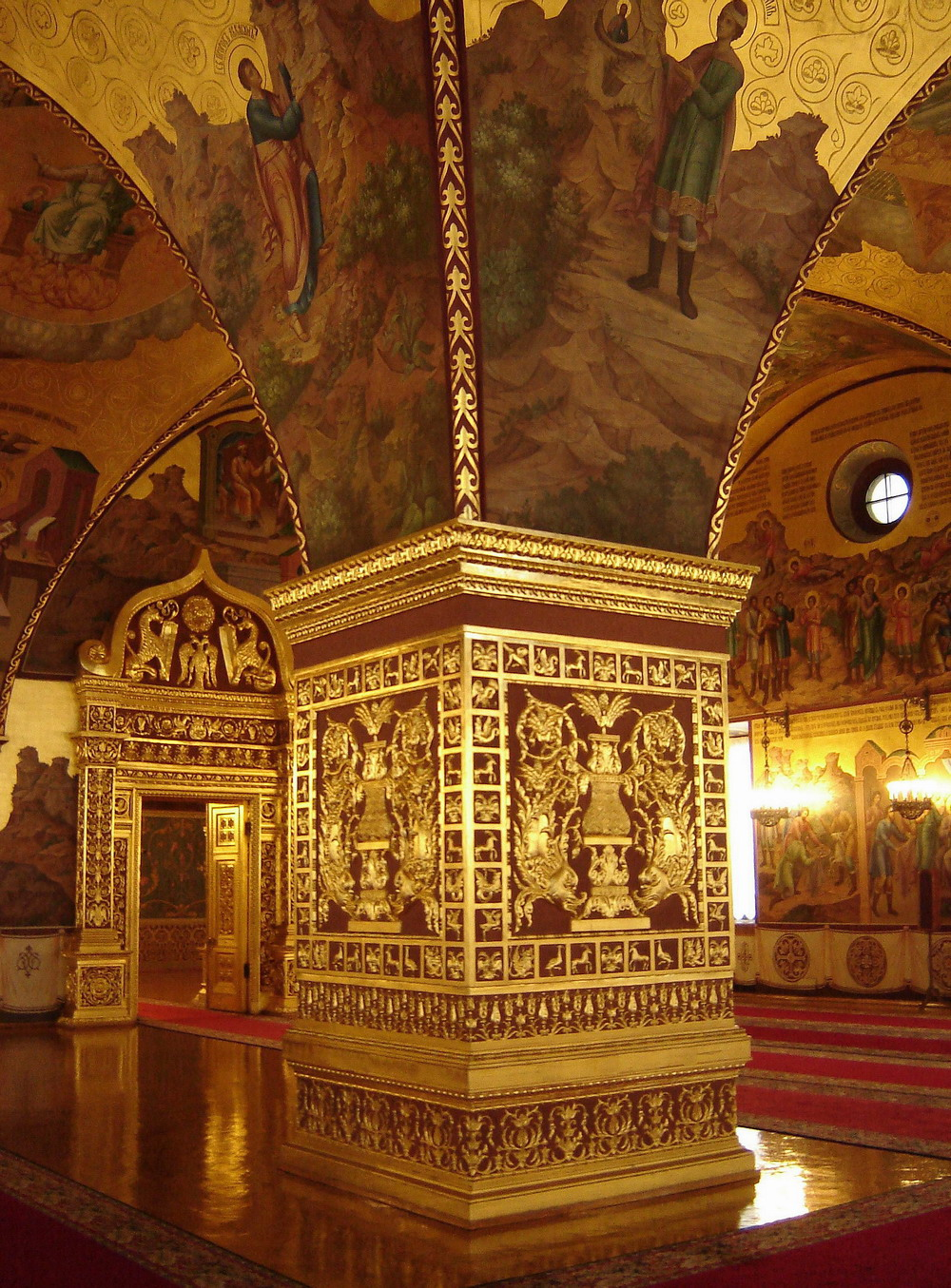
Palace of facets pillar

In 1487, Grand Duke Ivan III commissioned two Italian Renaissance architects, Marco Ruffo and Pietro Solario, to build a stone palace after a series of fires that had ravaged the then predominantly wooden Kremlin. The new palace was completed in 1492 and served as the most important venue for formal receptions of the Tsar, coronation celebrations, feasts, and state ceremonies. Tsar Ivan the Terrible celebrated his conquest of the Kazan Khanate at the Palace of Facets for three days in 1552. Likewise, Tsar Peter the Great used the palace to celebrate his 1709 victory over Sweden at the Battle of Poltava and the end of the Great Northern War in 1721. It was also within the Palace of Facets that the Zemsky Sobor was held in 1654, resulting in the Treaty of Pereyaslav uniting the Russian Empire with Ukraine.

Over the centuries, the Palace of Facets suffered repeatedly from major fires damage and was rebuilt several times in its history. However, it has continued to be used for state receptions even in modern times, including the 1994 state visit of Queen Elizabeth II. In June 2012, after an extensive restoration, the Palace of Facets was reopened to public, though in practice only organized prearranged tours are available.

== See also ==
- Palazzo dei Diamanti
