= Kremlin stars =

Decorative spires on the Moscow Kremlin

Coordinates: 55°45′9″N 37°37′17″E

Vector representation of a Kremlin star

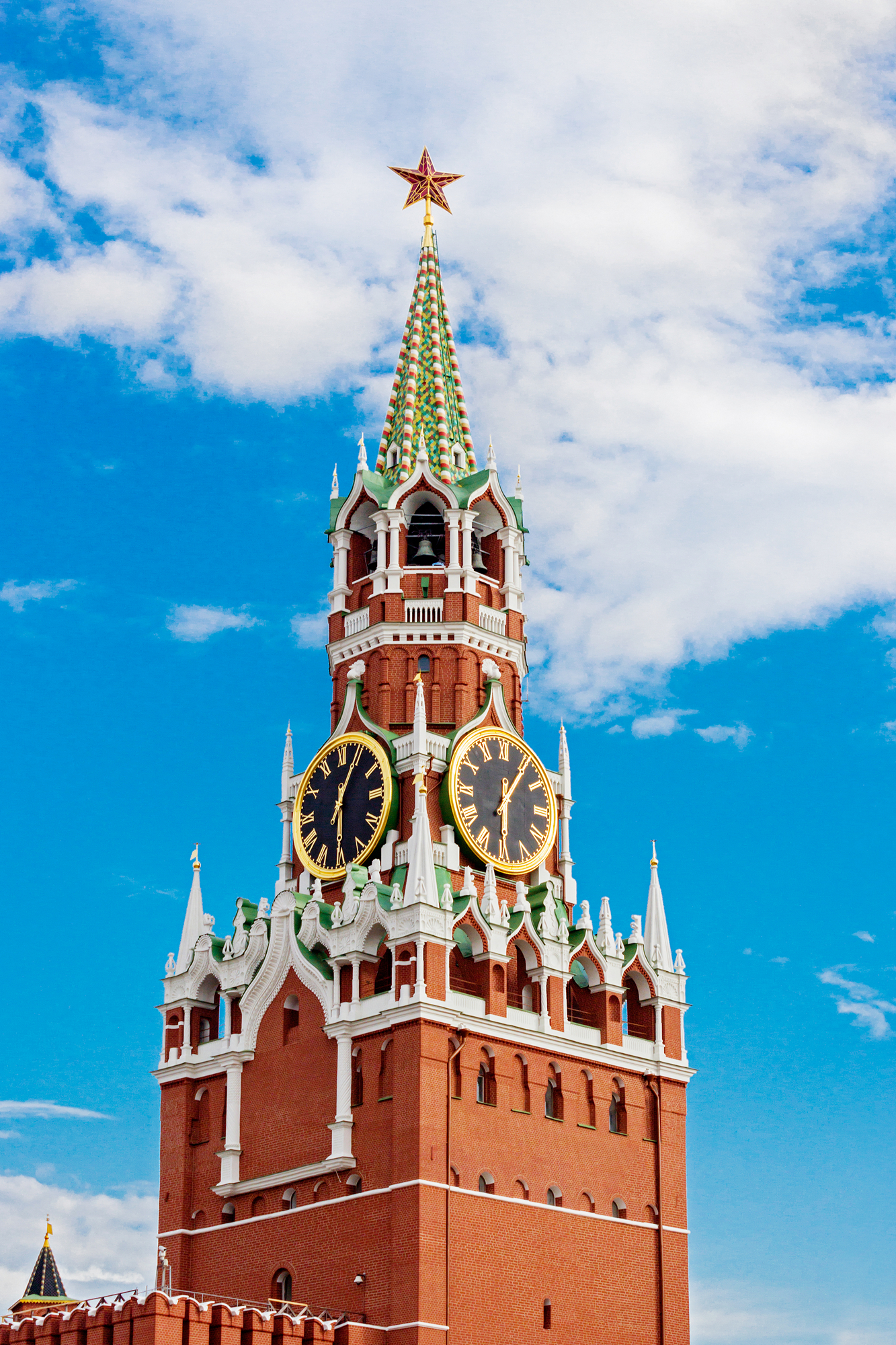
The red star at the Spasskaya Tower

The Kremlin stars (Russian: Кремлёвские звёзды, romanized: Kremlyovskiye zvyozdy) are pentagonal luminescent ruby stars, installed in the 1930s on five towers of the Moscow Kremlin, replacing gilded eagles that had symbolized Imperial Russia. In 1937, these stars were replaced with new ones made of ruby glass, in time for the 20th anniversary of the October Revolution. One more star was also installed on the Vodovzvodnaya tower.

The symbols become a part of the state and the ruling ideology of the former USSR, complementing the official coat of arms, which is complex in its image. The designing of the red star was commissioned by Fyodor Fedorovsky.

== History ==
=== The double-headed Imperial Eagle (1800s–1935) ===
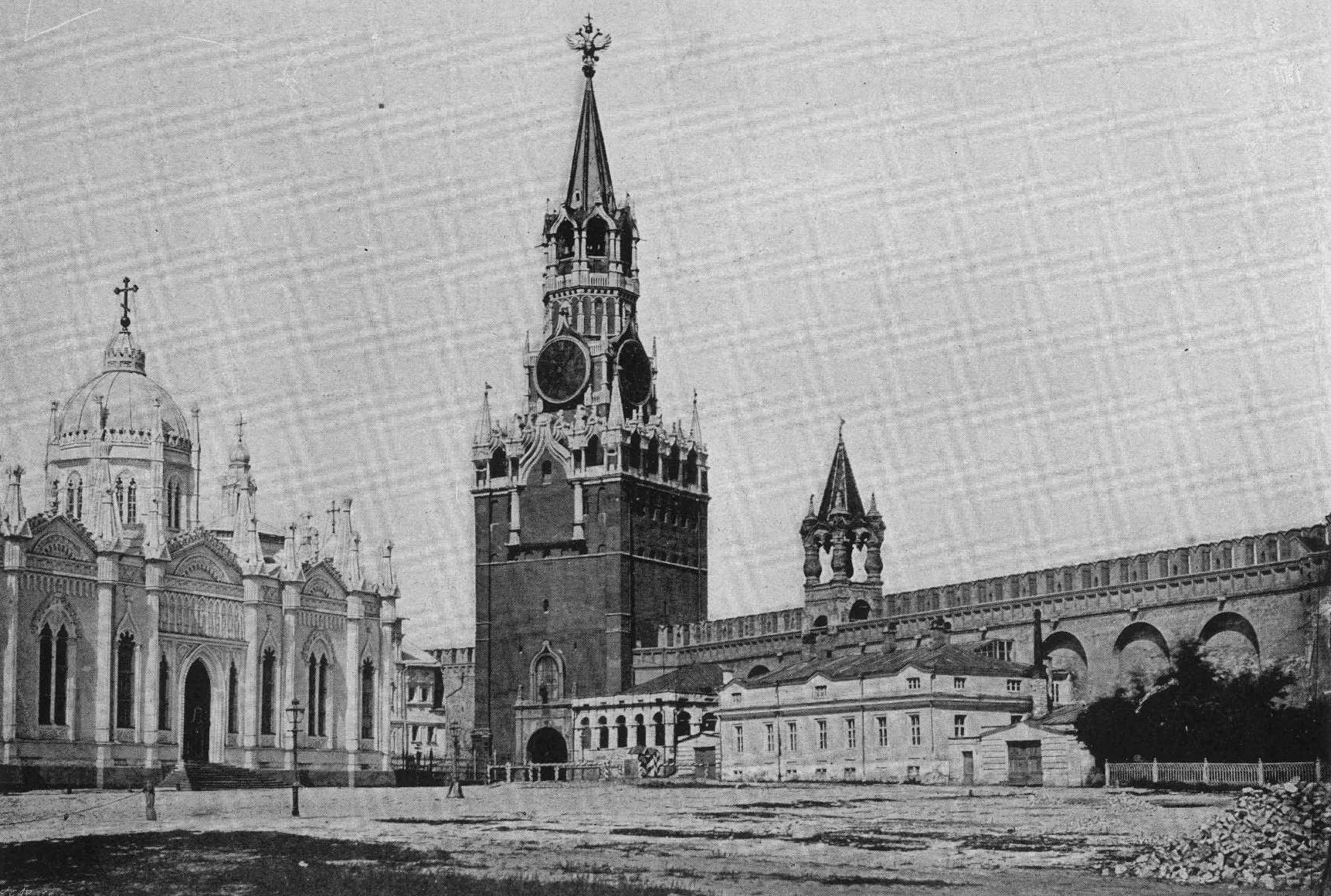
The double eagle at the Spasskaya in 1902.

Double-headed eagles were the state symbols of both the former Imperial and of present-day Russia, and since the beginning of the 17th century they had been present on the tops of the tents of the four Kremlin towers. Approximately once a century, with the change in the image of the state emblem, the gilded eagles on the towers were changed. The oldest tower was the eagle of the Trinity Tower in 1870, was demolished and replaced with the Spasskaya, in 1912.

=== Post-Revolution ===
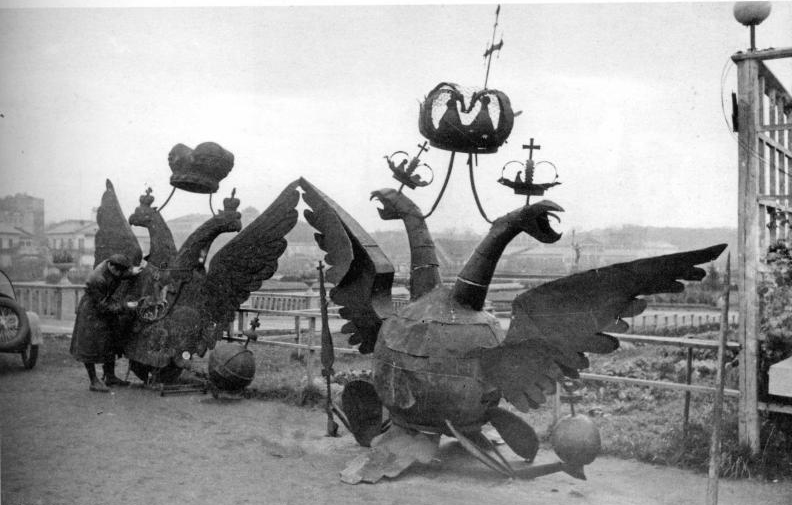
The dislocated eagles in 1935.

On May 7, 1918, after the Revolutions of 1917 and when Moscow was now the center of the Soviet Russia, the symbol of the "star of Mars with a plow and a hammer" was approved by the order of the People's Commissariat for Military Affairs led by Lev Trotsky. The propaganda leaflets of the Bolsheviks explained: "The Red Star is the star of happiness for all the poor, peasants and workers." Originally it was a military attribute; according to Trotsky's orders, civilians were threatened with a tribunal for wearing it. In due course, the star was made an important element of the flag and heraldry of the USSR. The five-pointed red star has become a symbol of the state and the ruling ideology, complementing the official coat of arms. By the end of 1910s, the symbolic meaning appeared: the five rays are five continents, which will soon unite under the banner of communism.

On December 31, 1931, during a meeting of the secretariat of the Central Executive Committee of the USSR, it was decided to allocate 95,000 rubles for the removal of eagles and their replacement with red stars. The removal of the eagles began in August 1935. The work was supervised by the Commandant of the State Defense, Pyotr Tkalun. Due to the old structure, the Eagle of the Trinity Tower was dismantled right at the top and lowered in parts. Some historians do believe about the storage of dislocated eagles in the basements of the Kremlin, but evidence confirms that they were sent to be melted down and on the replacement.

==== The gemmed hammer-sickle star (1935–1937) ====
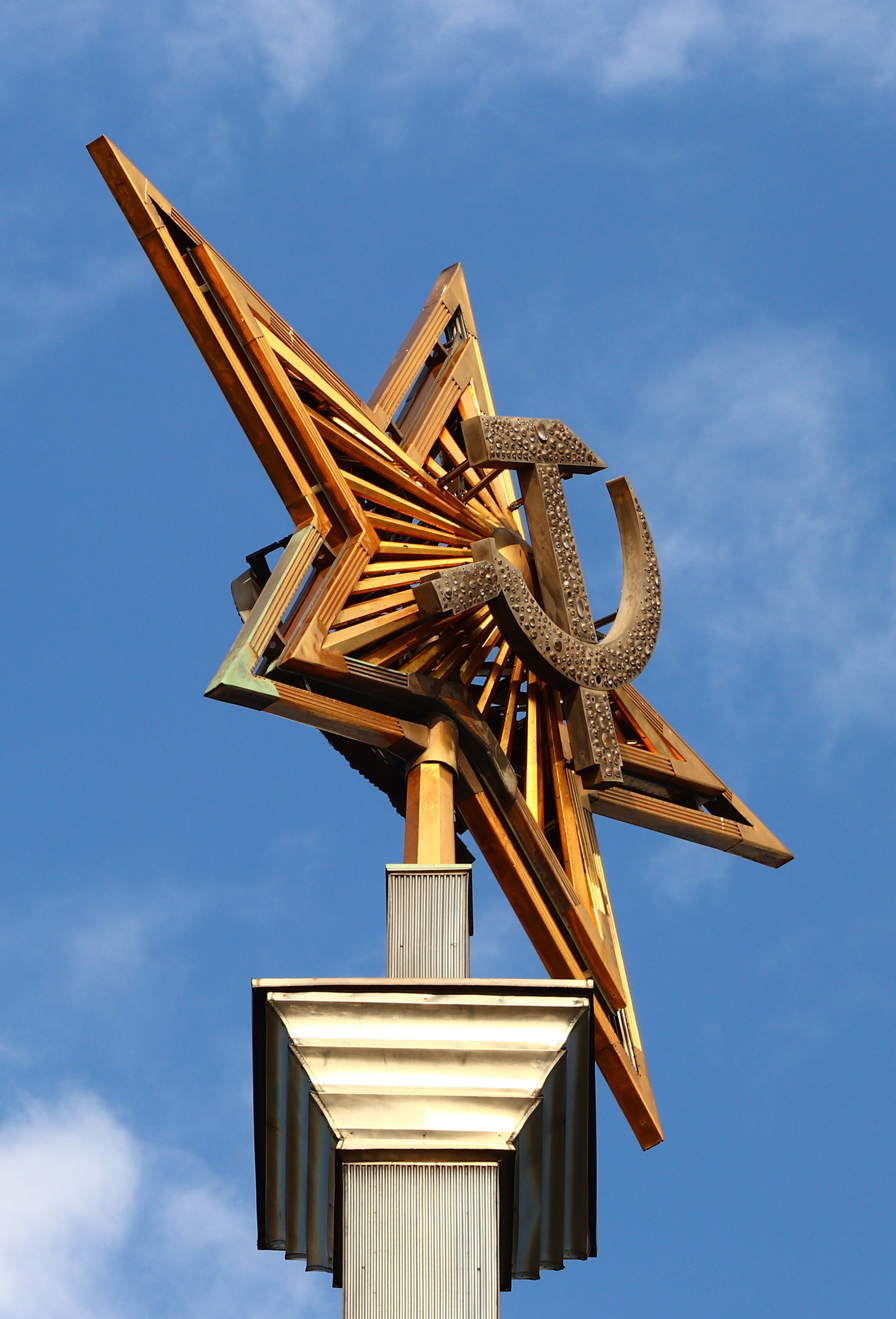
The original gemmed star located at the top of the North River Terminal's spire in Moscow.

On November 7, 1935, The Council of People's Committee of the USSR decided on removing four double-eagles located on the Spasskaya, Nikolskaya, Borovitskaya, and Trinity towers of the Kremlin wall, and two eagles from the building of the Historical Museum due to the ruling of Stalin that they ran counter to the rule of the Soviet ideology. The first Kremlin star was installed on top of the Spasskaya Tower on 25 October 1935. During the next week, another three stars were installed on the Troitskaya, Nikolskaya, and Borovitskaya towers. These stars replaced huge copper two-headed eagles, installed in pre-revolutionary times, which were a part of the Coat of Arms of Imperial Russia.

The body of each star was made of stainless steel and covered with copper plating. The Kremlin stars were decorated with a hammer and sickle on both sides, made of semi-precious stones from the Ural mountains. The installation of the first Kremlin stars did not meet the designer's expectations since the surfaces of the semi-precious stones lost their luster and required re-faceting.

The first star is now at the Moscow North River Terminal.

==== The ruby star (1937–present) ====
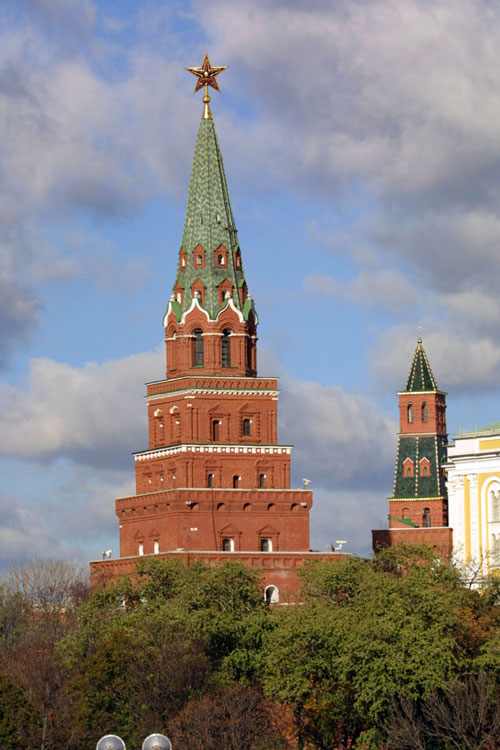
The ruby star on Borovitskaya tower was installed in 1967 for a short time, amid numerous replacements between 1937 and 1974.

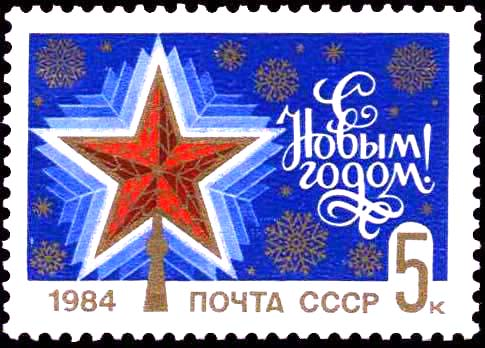
The Kremlin star depicted on a 1984 Soviet New Year postage stamp

On November 2, 1937, these stars were replaced with new ones made of ruby glass, in time for the 20th anniversary of the October Revolution. Another star was also installed on the Vodovzvodnaya tower. The old star from the Spasskaya Tower was transferred to the spire of the Northern River Station. The new stars were lit at the end of the month.

The lights were turned off during World War II from 1940 to 1945. At the same time, the Kremlin walls, some buildings, and the golden domes of churches were masked and repainted. The stars were even covered with protective covers, but by order of Joseph Stalin, they were opened and turned on during the 1941 military parade. Despite the protection, the glass on the stars was damaged during the bombing of the Nazi lead soldiers.

The stars were uncovered on May 10, 1945, after Victory Day.

The restored stars were re-lit in early 1946. Three decades later, from May to November 1974, a comprehensive plan for the restoration and reconstruction of Red Square and the historical and architectural monuments of the Kremlin was carried out, which included the first major overhaul of the stars. In addition to replacing glass and light bulbs, workers repaired some mechanisms of the stars.

=== Double-headed eagle controversy ===
Since the collapse of the Soviet Union, politicians have discussed restoring the double-headed eagles.

In 2010, President Dmitry Medvedev called for the return of the two-headed eagle to the Spasskaya Tower after the unveiling of the plastered Icon of Spas Smolensky (Christ the Saviour).

The Communist Party of the Russian Federation asked the leadership of the State Duma to a request a clarification of the situation, and received an answer from the Kremlin commandant Sergei Khlebnikov:

The star will be remain in its place. We are considering replacing the lamp with a more efficient one in terms of energy saving, when the scaffolding is removed from the tower, you will see not a two-headed eagle, but with a star that been washed, polished, and to shine all around.

== Characteristics of the stars ==
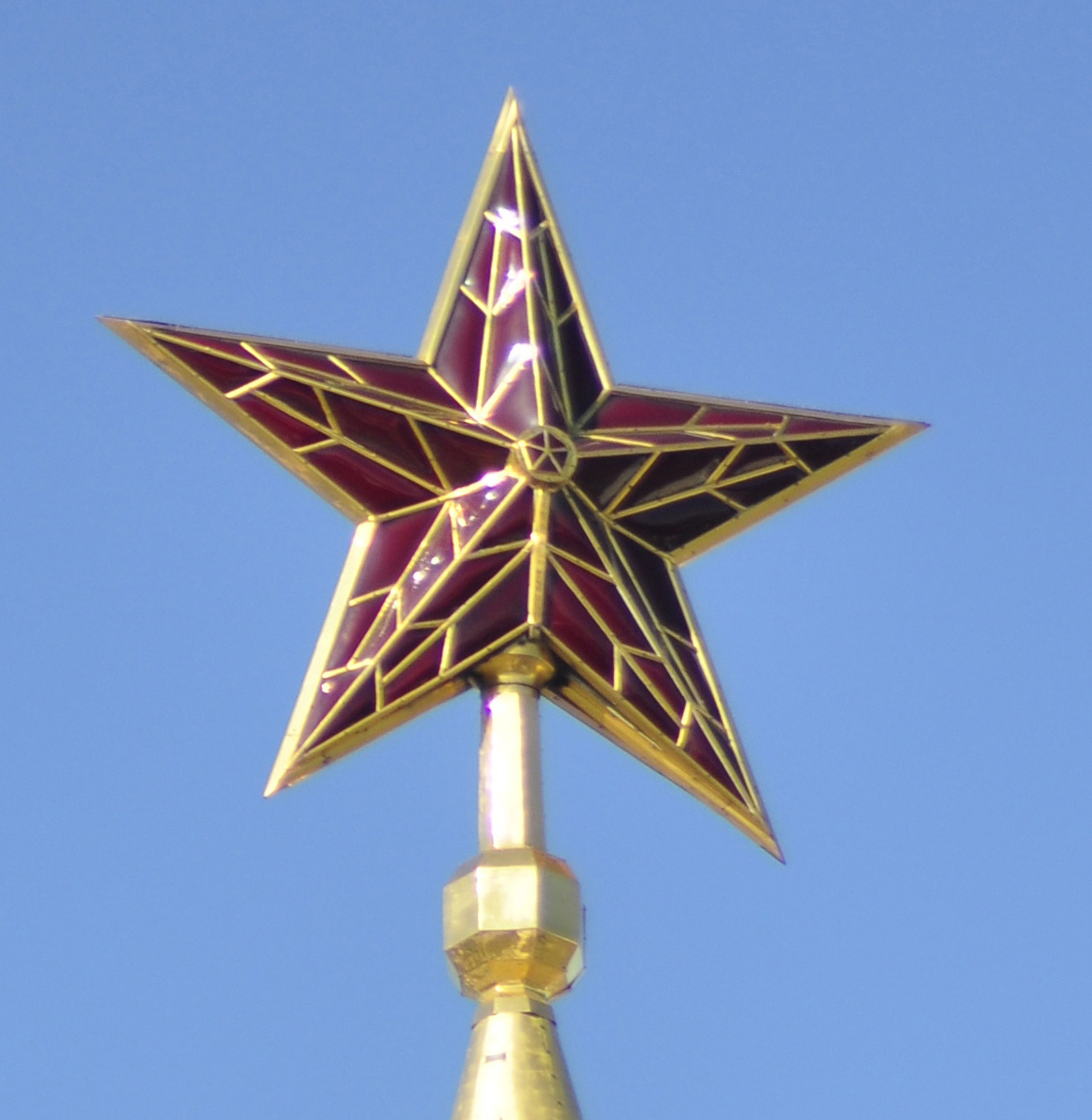
A Kremlin star

Upon the installment of the present day star, Specialists from 20 enterprises of ferrous and nonferrous metallurgy, engineering, electrical and glass industries, research and design institutes worked on the creation of new stars. People's artist Fyodor Fedorovsky redefined the shape and pattern of the stars, he proposed the ruby color of the glass. At his suggestion, the dimensions were changed so that the stars from the ground seemed to be the same. The size and the form of each of the five stars were defined proceeding from the height and architectural features of each corresponding tower. The distance between the end points of beams of the star installed on the Vodovzvodnaya tower equals 3 metres (9.8 ft), Borovitskaya tower – 3.2 metres (10 ft), Troitskaya tower – 3.5 metres (11 ft), and Nikolskaya and Spasskaya towers – 3.75 metres (12.3 ft). The bearing construction of each of the Kremlin stars is made of stainless steel and represents a spatial pentagonal star, the points of which have the form of a tetrahedral pyramid. The durability and rigidity of the construction was designed to withstand the maximum pressure of a hurricane wind equaling 200 kgf per square meter (2 kPa). Despite the considerable mass of each star (approximately 1 tonne), they revolve as the wind changes its direction. Because of its form, each star always positions itself with its frontal side against the wind. The Kremlin stars are illuminated from the inside by filament lamps so that they could be seen against the sky. Even distribution of light inside the stars is ensured by the refractors, which consist of prismatic glass plates. The power of these lamps (3.7 kW in the stars of the Vodovzvodnaya and Borovitskaya towers and 5 kW in the remaining three) ensures good visibility of the stars day and night. The lamps have a luminous efficacy of 22 lm/W. The 5 kW lamps are 383 millimetres (15.1 in) in length, the diameter of their retorts is 177 millimetres (7.0 in). Each lamp produces a great deal of heat; hence, each star has to be cooled. For this purpose, each tower is equipped with two fans aimed at the star.

The frame was made at the Elektrostal plant near Moscow. According to the new project, the star was supposed to be based on a three-dimensional frame made of high-quality stainless steel, the rays itself represented a multifaceted pyramid (the Nikolskaya star had a 12-sided one, the others had an 8-sided one), and the bases of the pyramids were welded together in the center of the star. This frame was designed to withstand the pressure of the hurricane wind, it rested at the base on a pipe, in which bearings were located for the rotation of the star. The outer contour and patterns of the stars were also made of gold- plated copper. The thickness of the gold coating was 40 microns, in total 11 kg of gold were consumed on copper parts.

When the stars were being covered with glass, the experts had to take into consideration the fact that the stars had to shine brightly during the night and keep their ruby red color during the day so that the electrical filament in the lamps remained invisible. Also, the experts had to consider the fact that the red glass illuminated from the outside by the sun appears almost black.

Machinery that services the Kremlin stars are located inside the towers. Special lifting devices allow for periodic cleaning of the stars inside and out, removing dust and soot. The machines can replace burnt-out lamps within 30–35 minutes. Experts in a special control room observe the work of the machinery.

The creation of ruby glass has become a major challenge for the glass industry. It had to correspond to certain parameters and having a different density and transmit only red rays of a certain wavelength. This glass had to be resistant to external factors such as weather, sudden temperature changes, nor to collapse under the influence of solar radiation. The work was entrusted from the Konstantinovskiy glass factory Stroysteklo.

Kurochkin came up with the idea of creating double-glazed stars. The inner surface was made of 2 mm thick milk glass, the air gap between ruby and milk glass is 1–2 mm. This was necessary to make the light sources inside the star more diffuse, also without white ruby glass during the day.

Bright and uniform illumination of the star's surface was achieved by a team of specialists from the lighting laboratory of the All-Union Electrotechnical Institute under the leadership of Professor Sergei Meisel and candidates of technical sciences N.V. Gorbachev and E.S. Ratner Especially for the stars at the Moscow Electric Lamp Plant, Chief Engineer R.A. Nelander developed unique incandescent lamps, the power of which was 3.7 kW for the stars of the Vodovzvodnaya and Nikolskaya towers, and 5 kW for the stars of the Spasskaya, Troitskaya and Borovitskaya towers. Lamp bulbs were made of heat-resistant molybdenum glass, inside there were two parallel-connected spirals, the temperature of the filaments of which reached 2800 °C.

The specialists of Stalprommekhanizatsiya created unique devices that made it possible to replace burnt-out lamps in 20–30 minutes. A ventilation system was also built into the stars, which cooled the lamps and cleaned the air from dust.

In 1946, they installed a combination of different types of glass for the stars, namely, ruby red and milk-white glass with a layer of transparent crystal glass between them. The milk-white glass disperses the light of the lamps and reflects most of the daytime light at the same time, softening the darkness of the ruby glass during the day. In order to achieve more contrast and emphasize the beams of the stars, they installed the ruby glass in different shades, which absorbs only the red rays with a wavelength of no more than 620 nanometres (2.4×10^{−5} in).The thickness of the glass in the stars is 6 to 8 millimetres (0.24 to 0.31 in). The area of a star covered with glass equals 6 square metres (65 sq ft). The special three-layered glass sheets (milky white, crystal clear, and ruby) were manufactured by the Gus-Khrustalny glass factory. The ruby layer of the sheets is colored by adding colloidal gold to the glass.

== Other displays ==
During the Iron Curtain era, some Eastern Bloc countries placed similar stars in their public facilities as symbols of their political adherence.

- From 1954 to 1990, the Central House of the Communist Party of Bulgaria in Sofia sported a red star (a replica of the Soviet one). Today, the star can be seen in the Museum of Socialist Art in Sofia.
- From 1947 the Parliament of Budapest showed a red star crowning the dome until it was replaced by a replica of the original top of the spire in 1990.
- The Sino-Soviet Friendship Building in Shanghai, which until 2011 was the seat of the municipal legislature, sports a similar star at the top of its spire.
