= List of Moscow Kremlin towers =

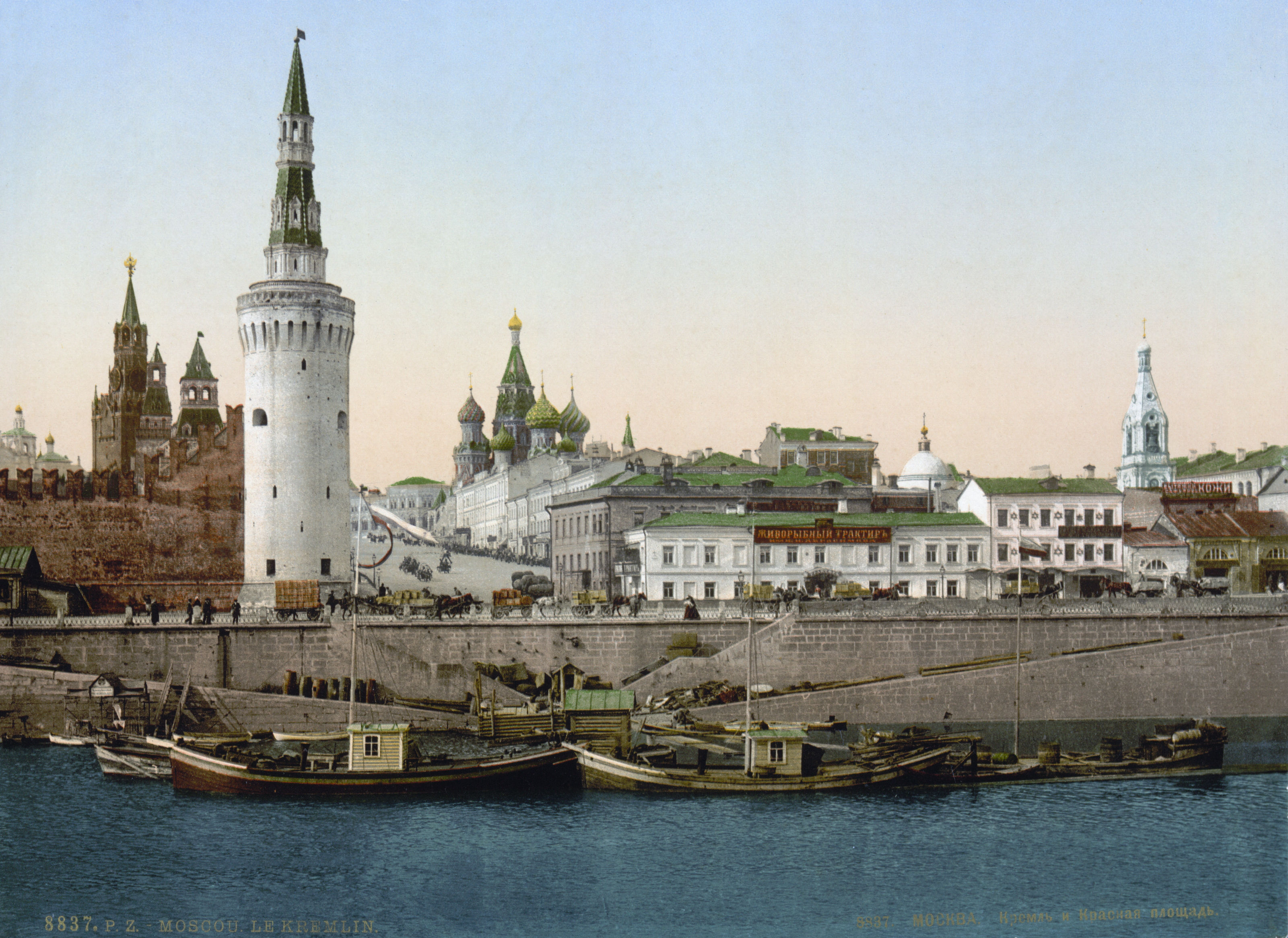
Kremlin towers in the 19th century

The following is a list of towers of the Moscow Kremlin. The Kremlin Wall is a defensive wall that surrounds the Moscow Kremlin, recognizable by the characteristic notches and its towers. The original walls were likely a simple wooden fence with guard towers built in 1156. The Kremlin is flanked by 19 towers with a 20th, the Kutafya Tower, not part of its walls.

== Borovitskaya ==
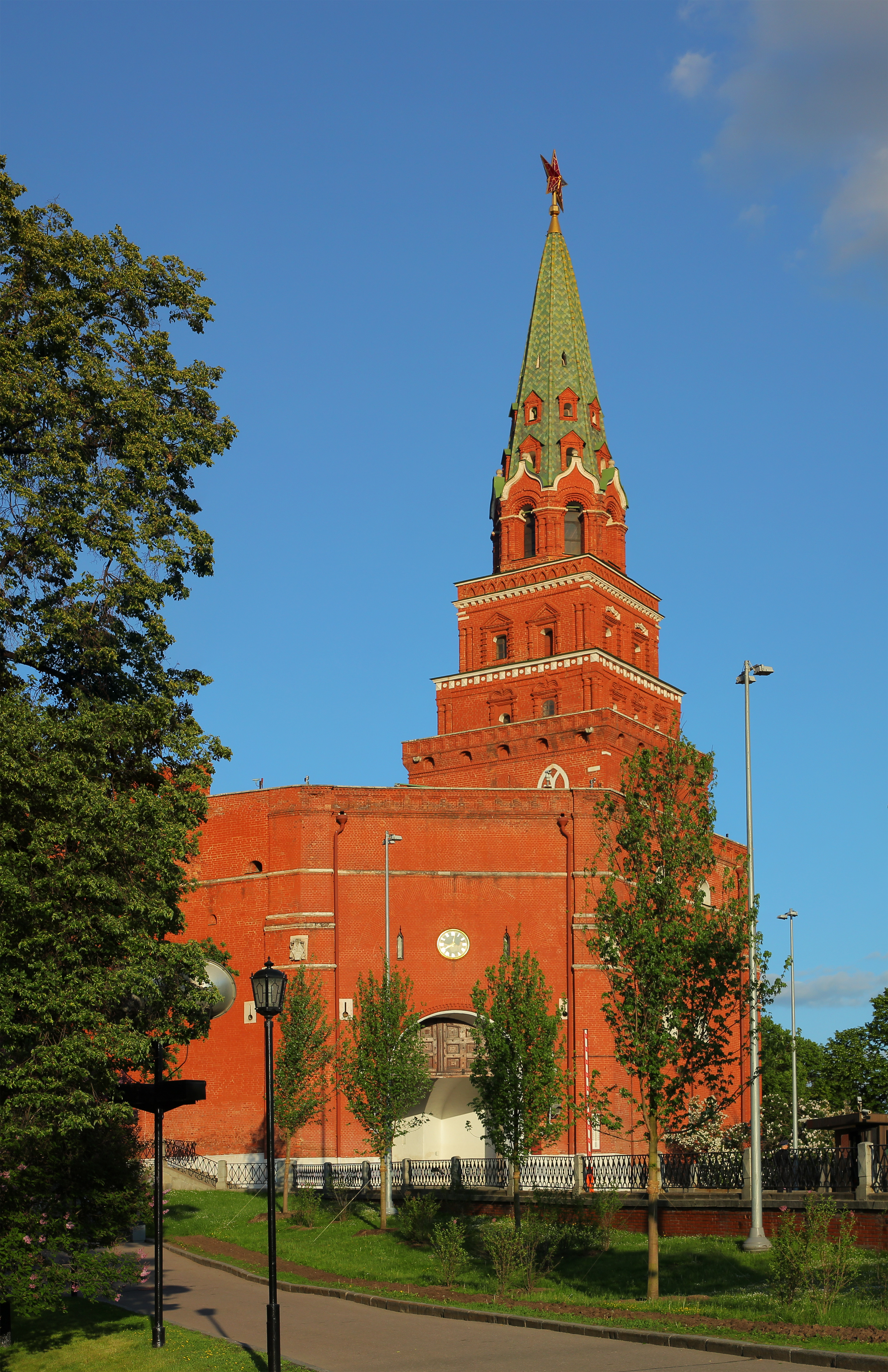
Borovitskaya Tower

The Borovitskaya Tower (Russian: Боровицкая башня, romanized: Borovitskaya bashnya) is a corner tower with a through-passage on the west side of the Kremlin. It is named after Borovitsky Hill, one of the seven hills Moscow is standing on. The tower was constructed in 1490 on the spot of an old Kremlin gate by Italian architect Pietro Antonio Solari (Petr Fryazin, from fryaz or fryag as Italians were called at that time) by order of Vasili III of Russia. In 1658 by orders of tzar Aleksey I of Russia the tower was renamed to Predtechenskaya (from the Russian word предтеча, the forerunner) after the Church of John the Forerunner, which was later destroyed during the construction of the Kremlin Armoury (Oruzheynaya Palata). The new name, however, never became popular. In 1812, the tower was damaged by an explosion staged by the retreating French army. In 1817-19, the tower was restored by architect Osip Bove. In 1935, the Soviets installed a red star on top of the tower. Following the closure of the Spassky Gate in Red Square to all traffic at the end of the 1990s, the Borovitsky Gate became the main vehicle passageway. Together with the star, its height is 54.05 metres (177.3 ft).

Geographical coordinates: 55.748909°N 37.612520°E.

== Vodovzvodnaya ==
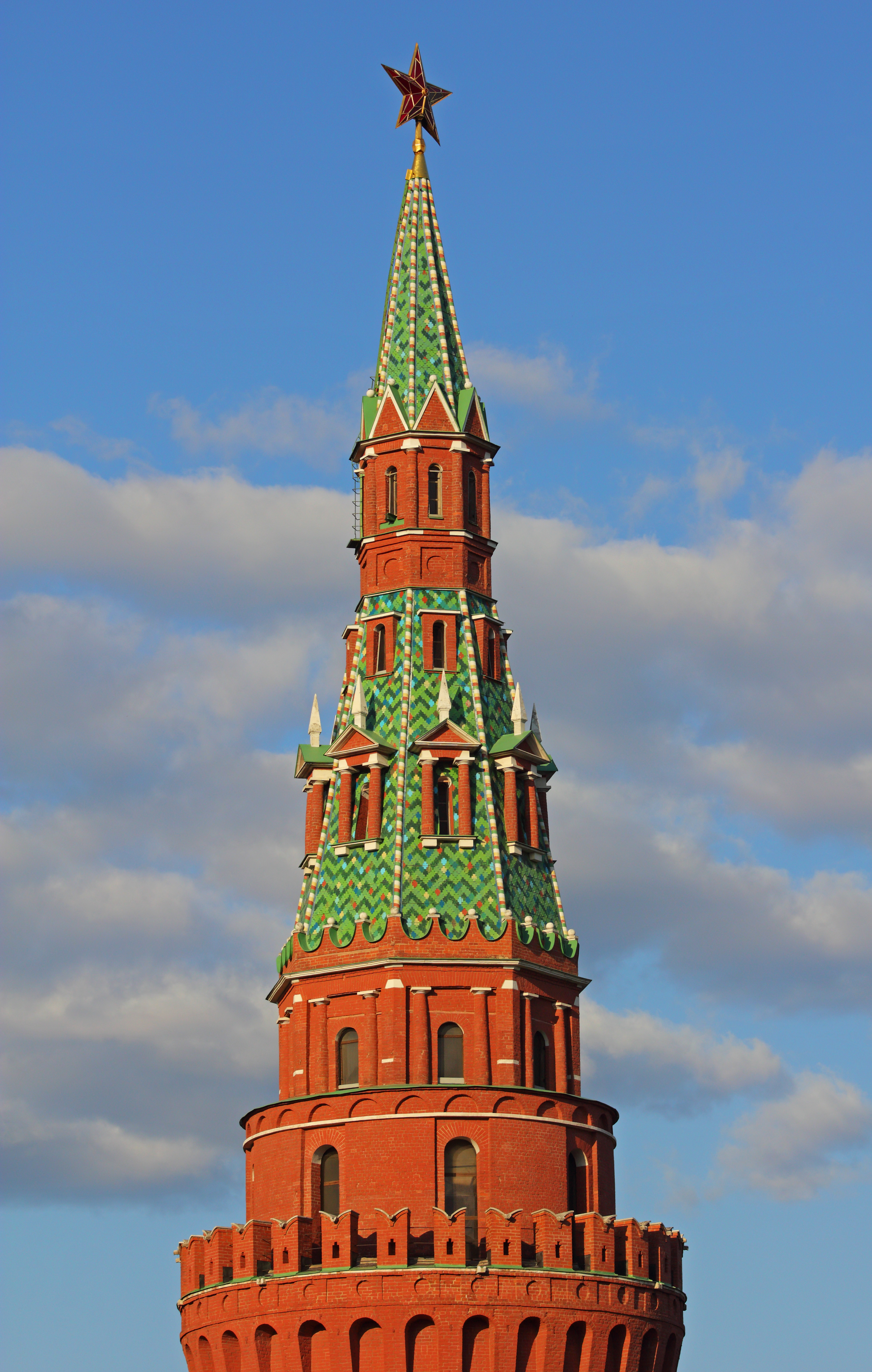
Vodovzvodnaya Tower

The Vodovzvodnaya Tower (Russian: Водовзводная башня, romanized: Vodovzvodnaya bashnya) is a corner tower on the southwestern side of Kremlin, overlooking the Moskva River. It was built in 1488 by an Italian architect Antonio Gilardi (also known as Anton Fryazin). Initially, the tower was called the Sviblova Tower (Свиблова башня) after the Sviblov boyar family, who had lived in a house adjacent to the tower from the Kremlin's side. The tower was renamed to Vodovzvodnaya in 1633 after the installation of a water-supplying machine inside the tower ("vodovzvodnaya" may be translated as "water-lifting"). In 1805, the Vodovzvodnaya Tower was dismantled due to its dilapidation and built once again. In 1812, the retreating French army blew it up. The tower was restored in 1817-1819 by architect Osip Bove. Its height is 61.85 metres (202.9 ft).

Geographical coordinates: 55.748106°N 37.613647°E.

== Blagoveschenskaya ==
The Blagoveschenskaya Tower (Russian: Благовещенская башня, romanized: Blagoveshchenskaya bashnya), known in English as the Annunciation Tower, was erected in 1487-1488. At its foundation are slabs of white limestone that have survived since the time of the white stone Kremlin of the 14th century. During the reign of Ivan the Terrible, the tower was used as a prison. The name of the tower comes from the miracle-working Icon of the Annunciation, which was once kept here, and is also associated with the Cathedral of the Annunciation added to the tower in the early 18th century and demolished in 1932. In the 17th century, the Portomoyniye Gates were built nearby so that palace laundresses could go to the Portomoiny raft on the Moscow River to rinse porty, or underclothes. These gates were bricked up in 1813.

The height of the tower is 30.7 metres (101 ft) (32.45 metres (106.5 ft) together with the weather vane that replaced the original cross in 1932).

Geographical coordinates: 55.748722°N 37.615192°E.

== Taynitskaya ==
The Taynitskaya Tower (Russian: Тайницкая башня, romanized: Taynitskaya bashnya; it was also called Водяная башня (Vodyanaya bashnya), or the Water Tower) is a middle tower on the south side of the Moscow Kremlin. It was built in 1485 by Antonio Gilardi on the spot of the gates to Dmitry Donskoy's whitestone Kremlin. The Taynitskaya Tower had a secret well and a tunnel leading to the Moscow River (hence, the name "Taynitskaya", or "secret"). In 1770, the tower was dismantled due to the construction of the Kremlin Palace by Vasili Bazhenov. It was rebuilt in the 1770s. In 1930-1933, the Soviets bricked up the gateway and filled up the well. The Taynitskaya Tower is 38.4 metres (126 ft) in height.

Geographical coordinates: 55.749374°N 37.617863°E.

== First Unnamed ==
The First Unnamed Tower (Russian: Первая Безымянная башня, romanized: Pervaya Bezymyannaya bashnya) was built next to the Taynitskaya Tower in the 1480s. It performed strictly defensive functions. In 1547, the tower was destroyed by fire after the gunpowder stored there exploded, and was rebuilt in the 17th century. In 1770, the tower was taken apart to clear the site for the Kremlin Palace. After the construction of the palace ended, the tower was rebuilt in 1783, closer to the Taynitskaya Tower. In 1812, the tower was blown up by Napoleon’s retreating troops, but it was soon restored to its original form by architect Osip Beauvais. Its height is 34.15 metres (112.0 ft).

Geographical coordinates: 55.749495°N 37.618968°E.

== Second Unnamed ==
The Second Unnamed Tower (Russian: Вторая Безымянная башня, romanized: Vtoraya Bezymyannaya bashnya) was built in the middle of the 15th century. It had purely defensive functions. In 1680, a quadrangular structure and a tall pyramidal tent roof with a watchtower were added to the top of the tower. It is crowned with an eight-sided hipped cupola with a weather vane.

Geographical coordinates: 55.749615°N 37.620363°E.

== Petrovskaya ==
The Petrovskaya Tower (Russian: Петровская башня, romanized: Petrovskaya bashnya) is named after the Church of Metropolitan Peter, which was part of the mission of the Ugreshi Monastery located near the tower in the Kremlin. The Petrovskaya Tower was destroyed by cannon fire during the Polish invasion in 1612 and then restored. In 1771, it was pulled down to construct the Kremlin Palace, but was rebuilt in 1783. In 1812, the tower was blown up by Napoleon’s retreating troops. In 1818, it was rebuilt by the architect Osip Bove. The Petrovskaya Tower was used as a service building by the Kremlin's gardeners. Its height is 27.15 metres (89.1 ft).

Geographical coordinates: 55.749700°N 37.622015°E.

== Beklemishevskaya ==
The Beklemishevskaya Tower (Russian: Беклемишевская башня, romanized: Beklemishevskaya bashnya, also known as Москворецкая башня (Moskvoretskaya bashnya), or Moskvoretskaya Tower) is a corner tower on the southeastern side of the Moscow Kremlin on the Moscow River. The tower was built in 1487-1488 by an Italian architect Marco Ruffo (known as Mark Fryazin in Russia). It was named after a boyar Ivan Bersen-Beklemishev, whose house had been adjacent to the tower from the Kremlin side. The Beklemishevskaya Tower was constructed for protecting the ford and the crossing over the Moscow River. There was the so-called "listening" vault underneath the tower, which was used for preventing the enemy from tunneling his way to the Kremlin. The Beklemishevskaya Tower is 46.2 metres (152 ft) in height. During the October Revolution of 1917, the top of the tower was damaged by a shell. It was restored a year later by an architect I.V. Rylsky.

Geographical coordinates: 55.749742°N 37.623239°E.

== Konstantino-Eleninskaya ==
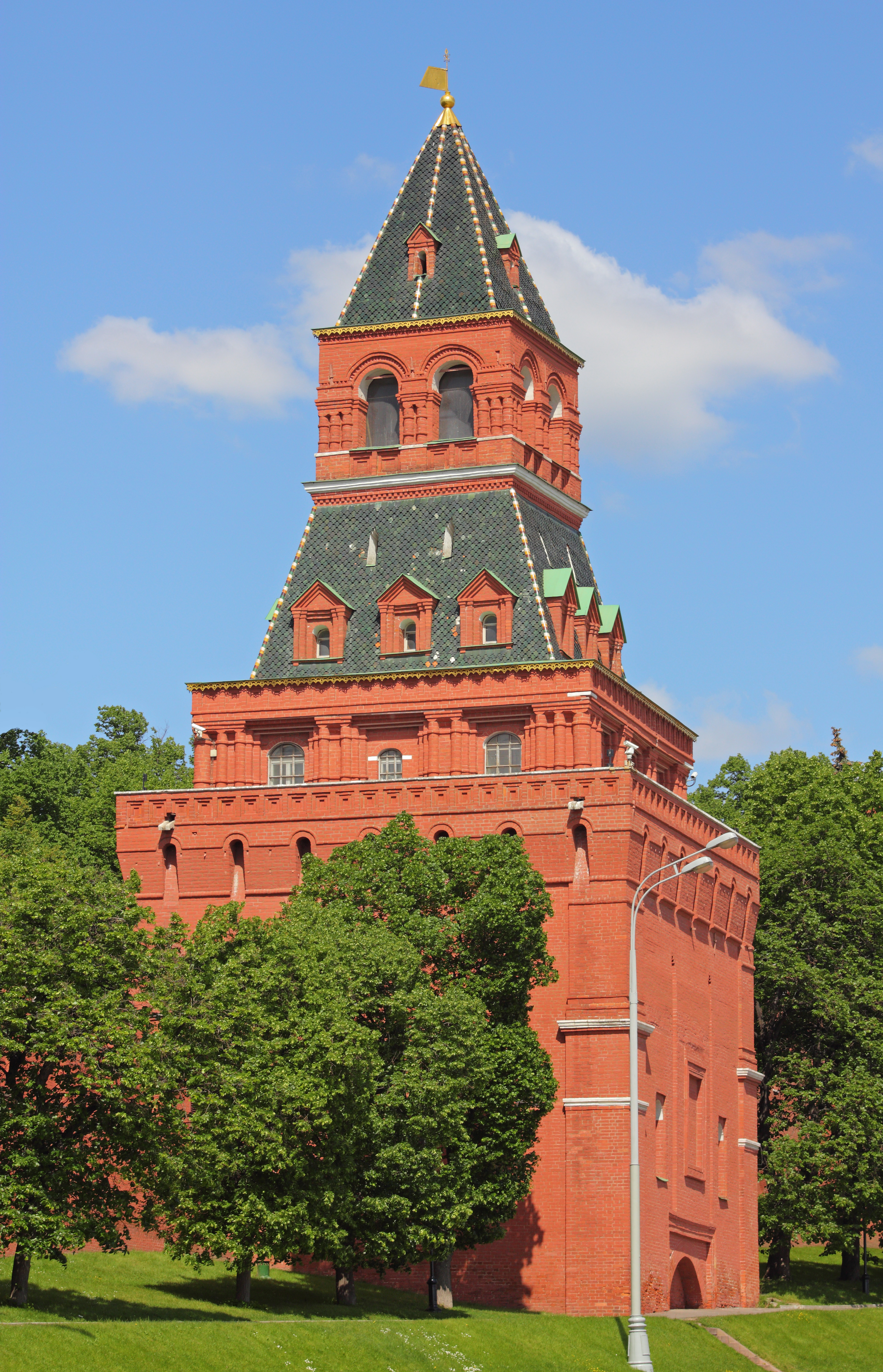
Konstantino-Eleninskaya Tower

The Konstantino-Eleninskaya Tower (Russian: Константино-Еленинская башня, romanized: Konstantino-Eleninskaya bashnya) is a tower on the eastern wall of the Kremlin, overlooking the so-called Basil Descent (Васильевский спуск), which begins at the Red Square and ends at the Moscow River. The tower was built in 1490 by an Italian architect Pietro Antonio Solari on the spot of gates to the whitestone Kremlin. It was named after the Church of Constantine and Helene in the Kremlin (second half of the 17th century), which would be demolished by the Soviets in 1928. The Konstantino-Eleninskaya Tower had its own gates and a lift bridge, protected by guards at all times. In the late 18th century - early 19th century the gates were bricked up and the bridge was dismantled. The tower's height is 36.8 metres (121 ft).

Geographical coordinates: 55.751179°N 37.622359°E.

== Nabatnaya ==
The Nabatnaya Tower (Russian: Набатная башня) is a tower in the southeastern section of the Kremlin Wall, built in 1495. It is 38 metres (125 ft) in height. Traditionally, there has always been a bell on top of the Nabatnaya Tower, used for notifying citizens of fires and other misfortunes in the Kremlin or on the Red Square (hence, the name Nabatnaya, which derives from the old Russian word набат - nabat, meaning "alarm" or "tocsin"). In 1680, a bellmaker Feodor Dmitriev cast the so-called Nabatny bell (alarm bell) weighing 150 poods (2.45 metric tons) and installed it on the tower. The bell subsequently broke and was re-cast by Ivan Motorin on 30 July 1714. The sound from this bell served as a signal for the spontaneous uprising of the Muscovites during the plague outbreak in 1771, which would later be called the Plague Riot (Чумной бунт). By the order of Catherine the Great, the tongue of the bell was removed after this incident. The tongueless bell remained on top of the tower for 30 more years. In the early 19th century, it was removed and transferred to the Arsenal. In 1821, the bell was moved to the Armoury, where it remains to this day in the vestibule.

Geographical coordinates: 55.751843°N 37.621908°E.

== Tsarskaya ==
The Tsarskaya Tower (Russian: Царская башня, translated as "Tsar's tower") is the youngest and smallest tower of all, built in 1680. It is not a tower per se, it is rather a stone terem, a tent-shaped chamber placed directly on top of the wall. Previously, there was a small wooden turret, from which, according to legend, tsar Ivan IV liked to observe what was happening on the Red Square. Hence the name, the Tsar's Tower. The white stone bands around the posts, tall corner pyramids with gilt flags and tent roof topped with an elegant gilt weather vane make the tower look like some structure from a fairy tale.

Geographical coordinates: 55.752284°N 37.621608°E.

== Spasskaya ==
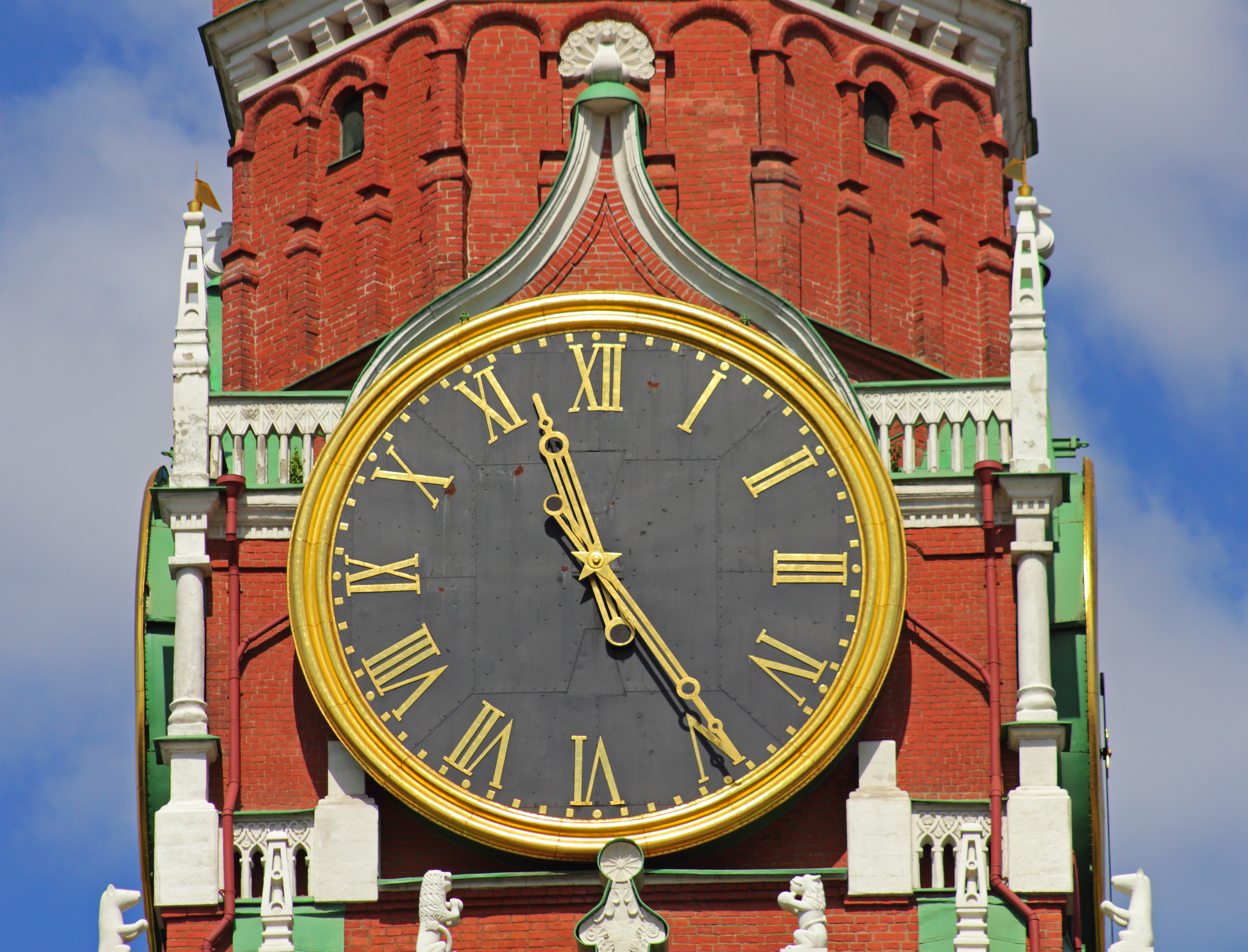
Clock of the Spasskaya Tower

The Spasskaya Tower was built in 1491 by the Italian architect Pietro Antonio Solari. Initially, it was named the Frolovskaya Tower after the Church of Frol and Lavr in the Kremlin, which is no longer there. The tower's modern name comes from the icon of 'Spas Nerukotvorny' (Russian: Спас Нерукотворный) translated as 'The Saviour Not Made by Hands', which was placed above the gates on the inside wall in 1658 and removed in 1917. The tower is also named for the wall-painted icon of 'Spas Smolensky' (Russian: Спас Смоленский) translated as 'Smolensky Saviour', which was created in the 16th century on the outside wall of tower, plastered over in 1937, but reopened and restored in 2010.

The Spasskaya Tower was the first tower of the many Moscow Kremlin Towers to be crowned with the hipped roof in 1624–1625 by architects Bazhen Ogurtsov and Christopher Galloway (a Scottish architect and clock maker). According to a number of historical accounts, the clock on the Spasskaya Tower appeared between 1491 and 1585. It is usually referred to as the Kremlin chimes (Кремлёвские куранты) and designates official Moscow Time. The clock face has a diameter of 6 metres (20 ft). The gate of Spasskaya Tower was used to greet foreign dignitaries, and was used during formal ceremonies or processions held on Red Square.

== Senatskaya ==
The Senatskaya Tower (Russian: Сенатская башня) was built in 1491 by an architect Pietro Antonio Solari and was purely defensive in nature: it guarded the Kremlin on the Red Square side. For a long time it remained nameless. It was only in 1787, after architect Matvei Kazakov constructed the Kremlin Senate on the Kremlin’s territory, that it was given its present name. The dome of the Senate can be seen from Red Square. Inside the central part of the tower there are three tiers of vaulted chambers. In 1860, the flat tower was topped with a stone tent roof crowned, in turn, with a gilt weather vane. The tower contains a through-passage that allows VIPs to travel from the kremlin to Red Square. Its height is 34.3 metres (113 ft).

Geographical coordinates: 55.753449°N 37.619548°E.

== Nikolskaya ==
The Nikolskaya Tower (Russian: Никольская башня) is a tower with a through-passage on the eastern wall of the Moscow Kremlin, which overlooks the Red Square not far from the State Historical Museum.

The Nikolskaya Tower was built in 1491 by an Italian architect Pietro Antonio Solari. It was named after Nikolaevsky (Nikolsky) Greek Monastery, which is no longer there. In 1806, the tower was rebuilt in the neo-Gothic style by an architect Luigi Rusca. In 1812, the top of the tower was blown up by the retreating French army. It was restored in 1816 by an architect Osip Bove. The Nikolskaya Tower was once again severely damaged by the artillery fire in October 1917 and was later restored by an architect Nikolai Markovnikov. In 1935, the Soviets installed a red star on top of the tower. Its current height with the star is 70.4 metres (231 ft). The original icon of Saint Nicholas of Mozhaysk, placed above the entrance on Red Square had been plastered over by Soviet authorities and was uncovered and restored in 2010 - similar to what took place on the Spasskaya Tower.

Geographical coordinates:55.754421°N 37.617713°E

== Corner Arsenalnaya ==
The Corner Arsenalnaya Tower (Russian: Арсенальная Угловая башня, i.e. "Corner Arsenal tower") is a tower of the Moscow Kremlin. It was built in 1492 by an Italian architect Pietro Antonio Solari. The construction of this tower completed the Kremlin's line of defence from the side of the Red Square. It was called the Sobakin Tower until the early 18th century (named so after a boyar Sobakin, whose house had been adjacent to the tower from the Kremlin side). The Corner Arsenalnaya Tower received its current name after the construction of the Arsenal. The tower still has a secret well. In 1707, due to a threat of Swedish invasion, the gun slots of the Corner Arsenalnaya Tower were enlarged to fit heavy cannons. In 1812, the tower was damaged by an explosion, set up by the retreating French army. It was restored in 1816-1819 by architect Osip Bove.

The tower's current height is over 60 metres (200 ft).

Geographical coordinates: 55.755110°N 37.616469°E.

== Middle Arsenalnaya ==
The Middle Arsenalnaya Tower (Russian: Средняя Арсенальная башня, i.e. "Middle Arsenal tower") is a Kremlin tower, built in 1495. It is located on the northwestern side of the Kremlin wall and overlooks the Alexander Garden. It is situated on the spot of a corner tower dating from the reign of Dmitry Donskoi. It was given its present name, the Middle Arsenal Tower, after the Arsenal was completed in the mid-18th century. Originally, it was called the Faceted Tower because of the shape of its façade. In 1680, an open lookout with a small pyramid-shaped top was added to the tower. In 1821, when the Alexander Garden was laid out, an ancient-style grotto was built at the foot of the tower, designed by Osip Bove.

Geographical coordinates: 55.753667°N 37.615525°E.

== Troitskaya ==
The Troitskaya Tower was built in 1495–1499 by an Italian architect Aloisio da Milano (known in Russia as Aleviz Fryazin Milanets). The tower has borne several names, including Rizopolozhenskaya, Znamenskaya, and Karetnaya. It received its current name in 1658 from the Troitskaya Coaching Inn (Троицкое подворье) in the Kremlin. The two-story basement of the tower housed a prison in the 16th–17th centuries. There is the Troitsky Bridge, which is protected by the Kutafia Tower and leads to the gates of the Troitskaya Tower. There was also a clock on top of the tower between 1585 and 1812. In 1707, due to a threat of Swedish invasion, the gun slots of the Troitskaya Tower were enlarged to fit heavy cannons. In 1935, the Soviets installed a red star on top of the Troitskaya Tower. Prior to Soviet rule the tower had an icon of the Holy Trinity atop its outward face. Because this tower was the formal entrance for huge Communist Party Congresses the icon was totally removed rather than just plastered over as were those on the Spasskaya and Nikolskaya Towers.

== Komendantskaya ==
The Komendantskaya Tower (Russian: Комендантская башня) was completed in 1495. It used to be called Kolymazhnaya after the Kremlin’s coach yard, where carriages and coaches had been kept. It was given its present name, the Commandant’s Tower, in the 19th century when the commandant of Moscow took up residence in the Kremlin’s Poteshny – or Amusement – Palace. Like all Kremlin towers, it was supplemented with a tent roof and watchtower in 1676-1686. The height of the tower on the side of the Alexander Garden is 41.25 metres (135.3 ft).

Geographical coordinates: 55.750575°N 37.613518°E.

== Oruzheynaya ==
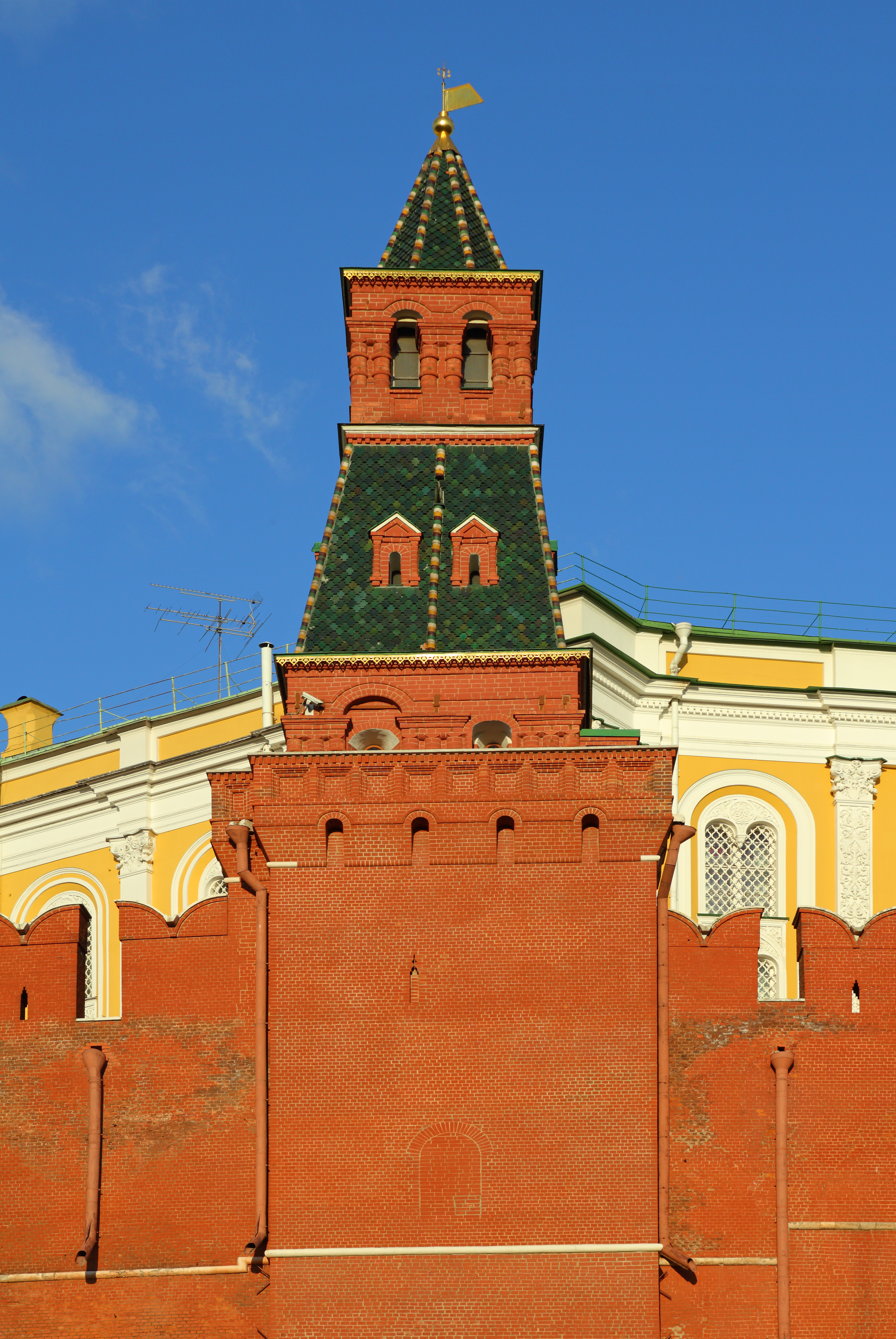
Oruzheynaya Tower

The Oruzheynaya Tower (Russian: Оружейная башня, translated as Armory Tower) was built in 1495. It was given its present name in the 19th century after the construction of the Armory. Before then, it was known as the Konyushennaya Tower, a reference to the royal stables that stood behind it.

Geographical coordinates: 55.749428°N 37.612714°E.

== Kutafya ==
The Kutafya Tower (Russian: Кутафья башня formerly Predmostnaya tower) is an outlying barbican tower of the Moscow Kremlin. Built in 1516 under the leadership of the Milanese architect Aloisio da Milano, in order to protect one end of the Neglinnaya River bridge that comes out of the West side of the Kremlin wall under the Troitskaya Tower. Initially, the Kutafya was surrounded by a moat and was the only access to the city through its lift bridge, nowadays the moat around the bridge has transformed into Alexander Garden. Kutafya is one of the lower height Kremlin towers which had two combat tiers and no spire, with the open-top upper landing equipped with arrowslits and machicolations, which made it a formidable obstacle to the besieging of the Kremlin fortress.

Marking today the main public entrance to the Kremlin, the Kutafya tower was modified several times through the centuries:

- in the 16th and 17th centuries, a system of dikes was built to raise the water level of the Neglinnaya river and create a moat that surrounded the tower from all sides, making its drawbridge the only entry point from the city;
- In 1668 a causeway leading through the tower to the Troitskaya Bridge was built;
- a delicate ornamental crown in the Muscovite baroque style was built in 1685;
- the divider between the two tiers was destroyed in 1780;
- in 1867, a through-passage to the Manezhnaya Street was built as well as the arched apertures on the sides and a guard house on the south side;
- the guard house was dismantled during the restoration works of carried out in 1974-77.

The Kutafya Tower is currently 13.5 m high; it used to be 18 m but the lower part of the tower was "submerged" by successive constructions that heightened the street-level ground.

Geographical coordinates: 55.752514°N 37.612649°E.
