= Aloisio the New =

16th-century Italian architect

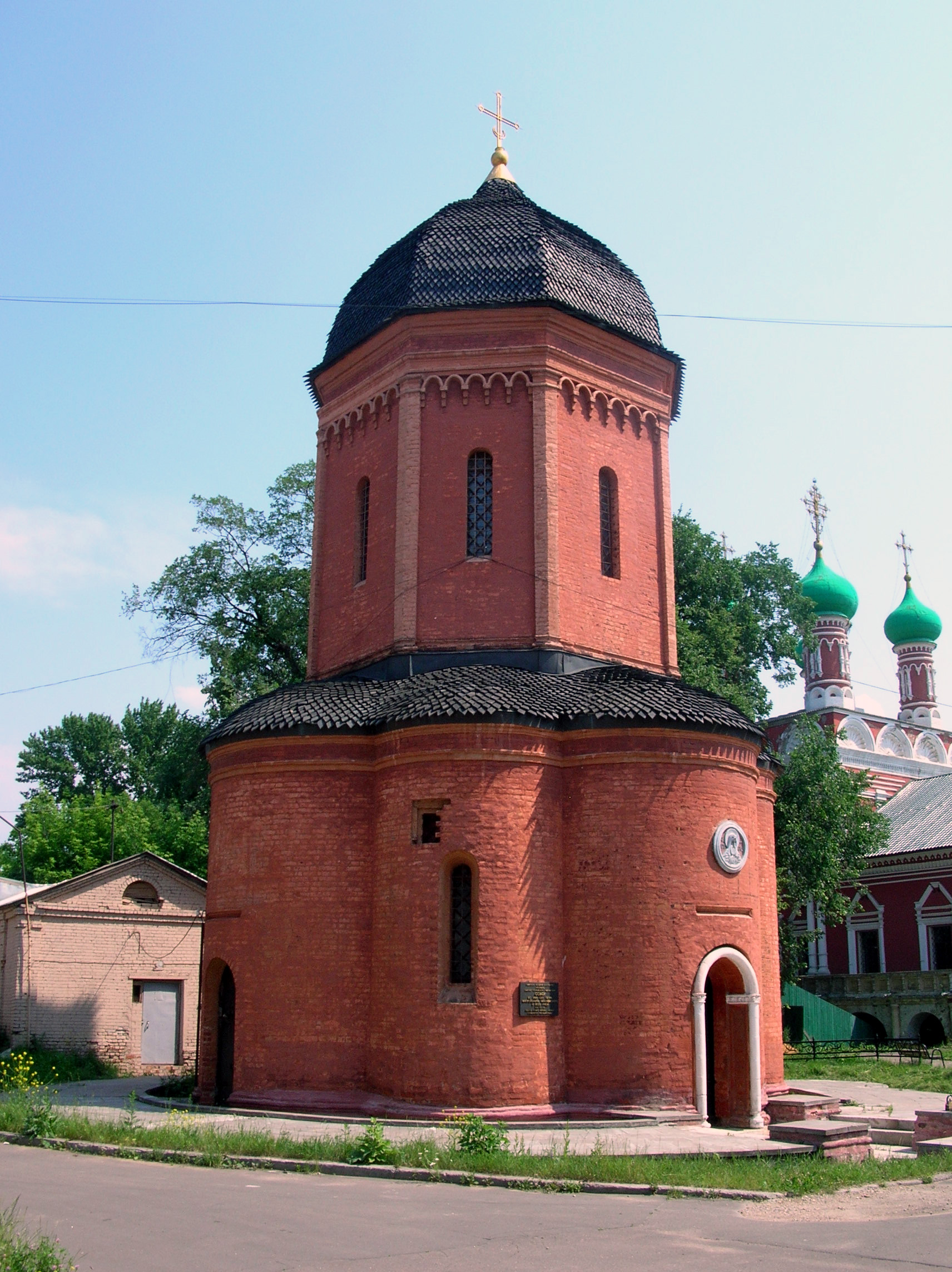
Cathedral of the Metropolitan Peter is one of 12 churches built by Aloisio in Moscow.

Aloisio the New (Russian: Алевиз Новый, romanized: Aleviz Novyy) or Aleviz Fryazin (Russian: Алевиз Фрязин) was an Italian Renaissance architect invited by Ivan III of Russia to work in Moscow. Some Italian scholars have attempted to identify him with the Venetian sculptor Alvise Lamberti da Montagnana, but this is still widely disputed. He was one of the four senior Italian masters to work in Russia, along with Aristotele Fioravanti, Pietro Antonio Solari, and Petrok Maly.

== Life ==
He is sometimes identified with the Venetian sculptor Alvise Lamberti da Montagnana. On his way to Russia, Aloisio was captured by Meñli I Giray, the khan of Crimea. At the khan's court, Aloisio built some sections of the famous palace in Bakhchisaray. The Italianate carved portal of the palace is particularly noteworthy.

In 1504, he finally arrived in Moscow as the head of an artel of Italian masters, with a letter of recommendation from the khan. He became known to Russians as Aleviz the New, to distinguish him from his namesake, who had been working at the Kremlin since 1494. Aloisio's first and principal work in Moscow was the Archangel Cathedral, the burial place of Muscovite monarchs. It combined features of early Venetian architecture with Old Russian architecture. The cathedral's elaborate Renaissance ornamentation was extensively copied throughout 16th-century Russia. He also built the Church of the Nativity of St. John the Baptist in 1508.

Aloisio the New was last mentioned in 1514, when he was entrusted by Vasili III to build 11 churches in Moscow. Although only parts of these structures have been preserved, there is enough evidence to assume that they were built in strikingly differing styles. The best preserved of these churches is the katholikon of the Vysokopetrovsky Monastery in Moscow (1514–17), considered the earliest rotunda in Russia.

== Sources ==
- Samoylova, T. Ye (2000). "Алевиз Новый". Православная энциклопедия — Т. I: А — Алексий Студит. Moscow: Православная энциклопедия. p. 471. ISBN 5-89572-006-4.
