= Fyodor Fedorovsky =

Russian painter

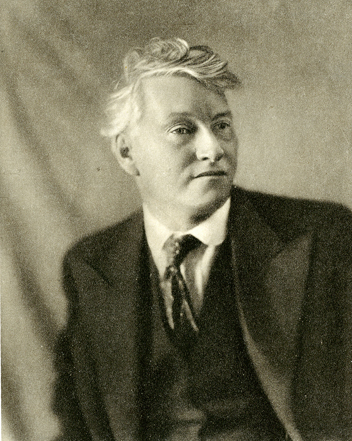
Fyodor Fedorovsky

Fyodor Fyodorovich Fedorovsky (Russian: Фёдор Фёдорович Федоровский) (December 26 (O.S. December 14), 1883 in Chernigov – September 7, 1955 in Moscow) was a Soviet stage designer, People's Artist of the USSR (1951), and active member of the Soviet Academy of Arts (1947; in 1947-1953 - academy's vice president), author of Kremlin stars.

== Awards ==
- Stalin Prize second degree (1941)
- Stalin Prize first degree (1943, 1949, 1950, 1951)
- Order of Lenin
- two other orders
- numerous medals.
