= Pietro Antonio Solari =

Italian architect (c. 1445 – 1493)

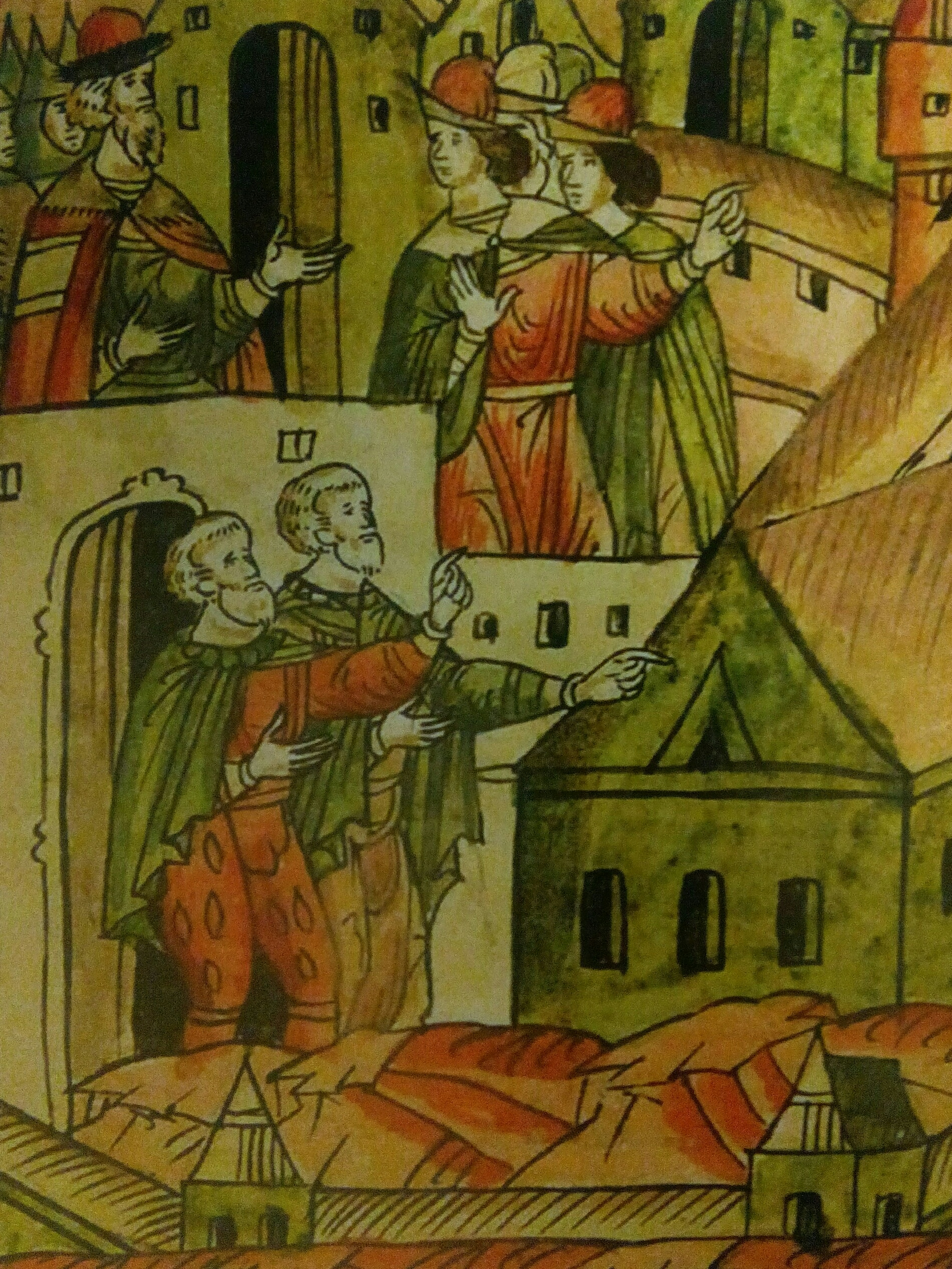
Pietro Antonio Solari and Marco Ruffo (at the bottom). Fragment of miniature from the Illustrated Chronicle of Ivan the Terrible.

Pietro Antonio Solari (Latin: Petrus Antonius Solarius; c. 1445 – May 1493), also known as Pyotr Fryazin (Russian: Пётр Фрязин), was an Italian Renaissance architect and sculptor. He was invited to Moscow by Grand Prince Ivan III to design the walls and towers of the reconstructed Kremlin.

== Biography ==
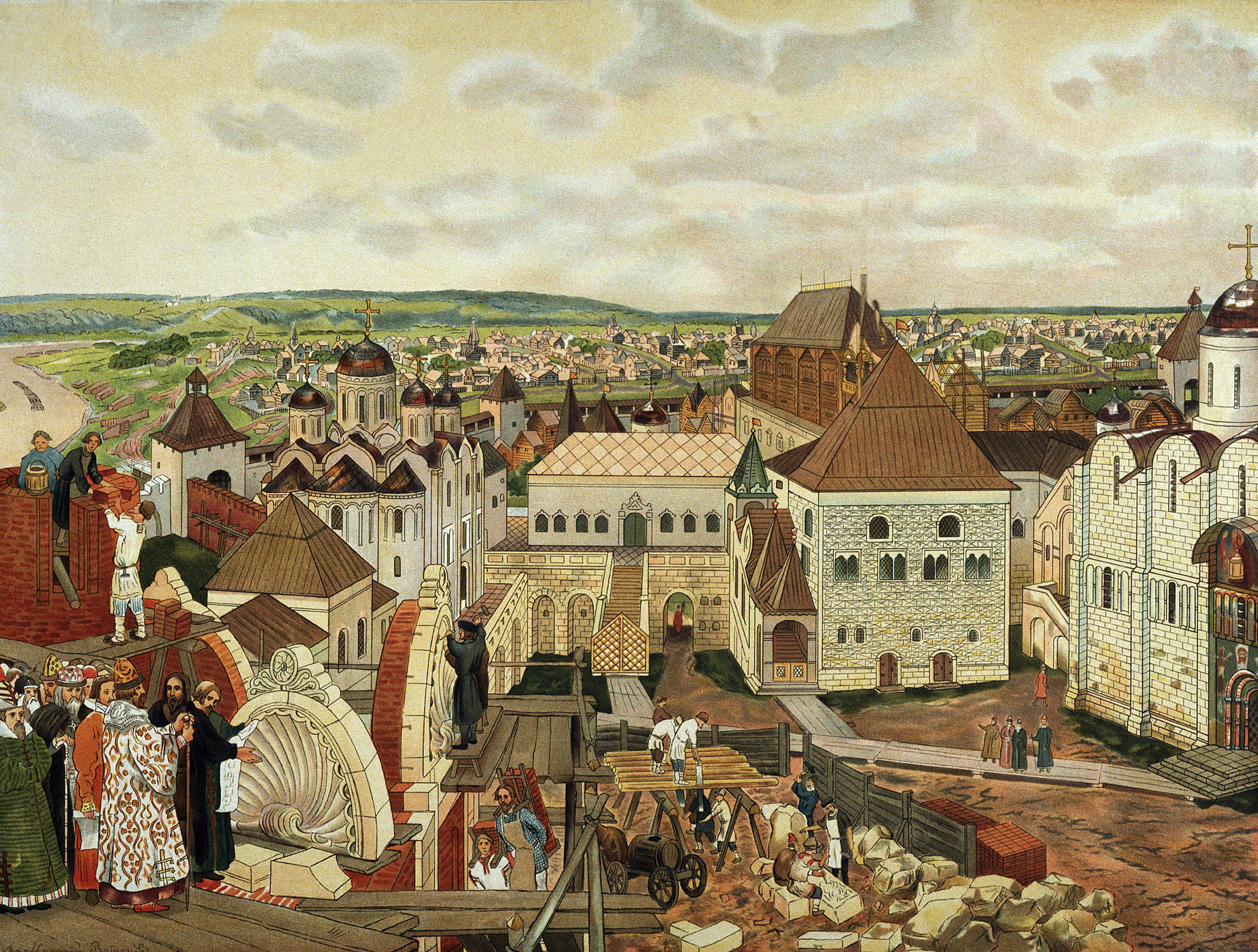
Apollinary Vasnetsov's depiction of the Kremlin under Ivan III.

He was born in Carona and apprenticed under his father Guiniforte Solari, who was the leading architect of the Duomo di Milano. In his father's workshop, he learned to draw plans and sculpture statues. In 1476, he was hired to contribute to the construction of the Duomo di Milano. At 26, he was appointed a deputy of his father by the duke of the Duchy of Milan. When his father died, he was appointed his successor for the buildings of the Duke but not at the Cathedral of Milan. Later he also sculpted a tomb of the bishop Marco de Capitani in the Cathedral of Alessandria.

In 1487, he was invited to Russia by Grand Prince Ivan III to construct the walls and towers of the Moscow Kremlin. Within the next two years, Solari built most of the walls (excluding the western wall built by his successor Aleviz) and towers of the Kremlin, including the Borovitskaya, Konstantino-Eleninskaya, Spasskaya, Nikolskaya, and Corner Arsenalnaya towers. Engineering methods, technique and architectural forms, used by Solari, were reminiscent of the fortifications of Northern Italy. Together with Marco Ruffo, Solari also built the Palace of Facets in the Kremlin.

The inscription over the main entrance to the Spasskaya Tower describes Ivan III as the ruler "Dei Gratia of Moscow, Novgorod, Tver Pskov, Vyatka, Ugorsky, Perm, Bulgaria and all of Russia". The use of Latin demonstrates the grand prince's aim to impress European ambassadors visiting his court with the extent of his authority.

He died in Moscow in May 1493. The Fryazin title originates from the old Russian word fryaz (фрязь), derived from frank, that was used to denote people from Northern Italy.

== Sources ==
- Arte e artisti dei laghi lombardi. Como: Noseda. 1959.
