= Aloisio da Milano =

Italian architect (fl. 1494–1510s)

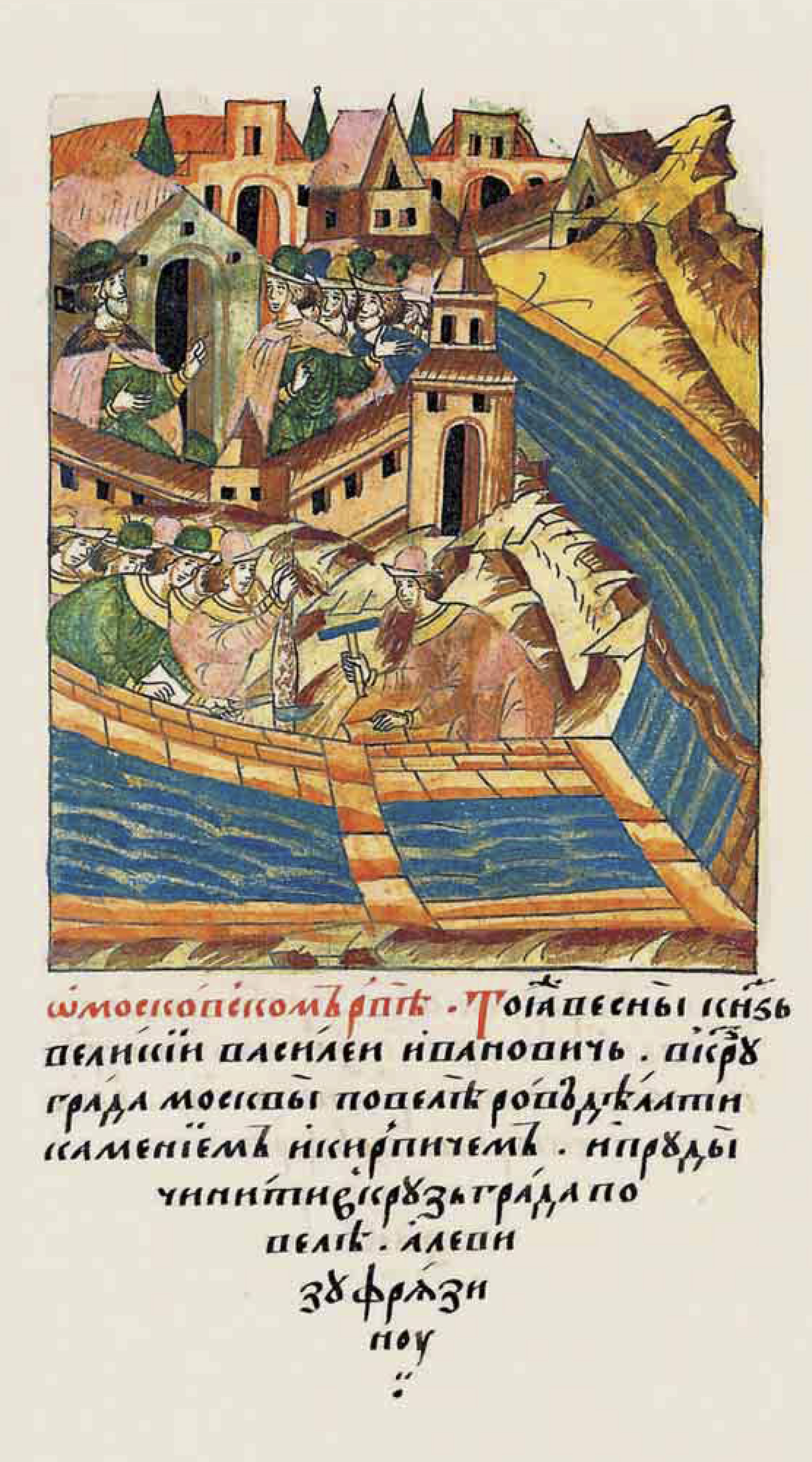
Grand Prince Vasily III orders Aloisio to build a moat, miniature from the Illustrated Chronicle of Ivan the Terrible, 16th century

Aloisio da Milano, also known as Aloisio da Carezano, Aleviz Milanets, (Note: Russian: Алевиз Миланец.) and Aleviz Fryazin (Note: Russian: Алевиз Фрязин.) (born c. 15th century), was an Italian architect who worked in the Grand Principality of Moscow from 1494 to c. 1515. He is also known as Aloisio the Old (Russian: Алевиз Старый, romanized: Aleviz Stary) to distinguish him from Aloisio the New, another Italian master who worked in Russia.

== Architectural work in Moscow ==
Aloisio da Carezano came to Moscow in 1494, at the invitation of Ivan III, to replace Pietro Antonio Solari as a senior court architect, responsible for fortifications and palaces.

- In 1495, he rebuilt the walls and towers of the Moscow Kremlin, along the Neglinnaya River.
- In 1499–1508, Aloisio da Milano constructed a few stone chambers, which today constitute the first three floors of the Terem Palace.
- In 1508–1516, he also dug a moat (later dubbed the Alevizov moat in his honor) along the Kremlin wall on the side of the Red Square, covered with limestone and bricks. It was filled up in the 19th century.
- Aloisio da Milano also constructed a dam on the Neglinnaya River in 1508, and a bridge over it in 1516.

== Origin of title ==
The Fryazin title originates from the old Russian word fryaz (фрязь), derived from frank, that was used to denote people from Northern Italy.

== See also ==
- Aloisio the New

== Sources ==
- "Алевиз Фрязин" . Brockhaus and Efron Encyclopedic Dictionary (in Russian). 1906.
- Belyayev, L. A. (2000). "Алевиз Фрязин (Старый)". Православная энциклопедия — Т. I: А — Алексий Студит. Moscow: Православная энциклопедия. p. 471. ISBN 5-89572-006-4.
- Samoylova, T. Ye (2000). "Алевиз Новый". Православная энциклопедия — Т. I: А — Алексий Студит. Moscow: Православная энциклопедия. p. 471. ISBN 5-89572-006-4.
