= Senate Square =

The Senate Square can refer to several squares depending on the city:

- Helsinki Senate Square, a square in Helsinki, Finland
- The Saint Petersburg Senate Square, a square in Saint Petersburg, Russia, formerly known as Decembrists' Square
- The Moscow Senate Square, a square in Moscow between Kremlin Arsenal and Kremlin Senate
- The Senado Square, in Macau, China
