= Kremlin =

Fortified complex in Moscow, Russia

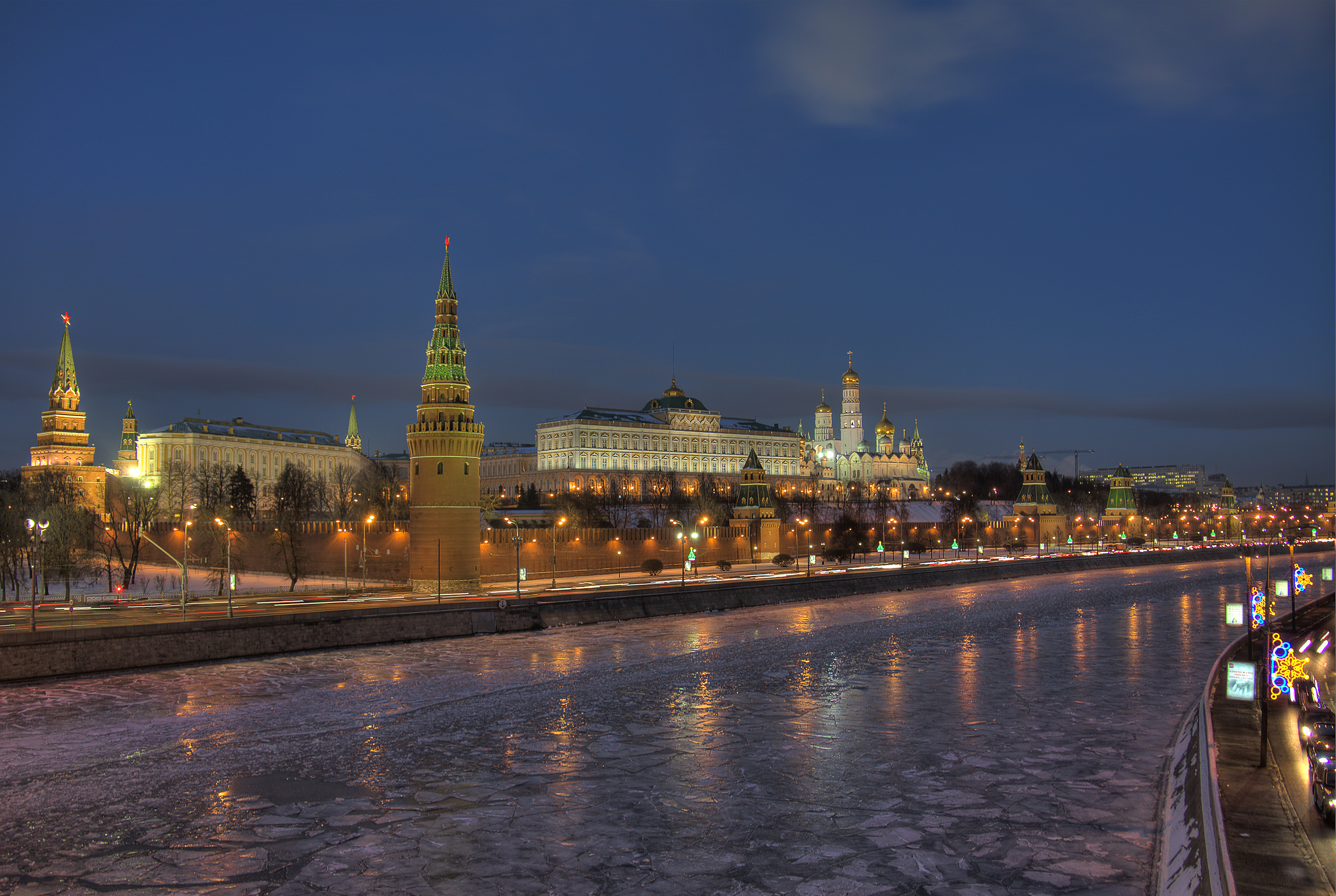
- View of the Kremlin from across the Moskva River, 2012

- Location in Central Moscow Location in Russia Location in Europe
- 55°45′6″N 37°37′4″E
- Location: Moscow, Russia

History
- Built: 1482–1495

Site notes
- Area: 27.7 ha (0.277 km^{2})

UNESCO World Heritage Site
- Official name: Kremlin and Red Square, Moscow
- Type: Cultural
- Criteria: i, ii, iv, vi
- Designated: 1990 (14th session)
- Reference no.: 545
- Region: Eastern Europe

The Moscow Kremlin, (Note: Russian: Московский Кремль, romanized: Moskovskiy Kreml', IPA: [mɐˈskofskʲɪj ˈkrʲemlʲ]) commonly known as the Kremlin, (Note: /ˈkrɛmlɪn/ KREM-lin; Russian: [ˈkrʲemlʲ]) is a fortified complex (kremlin) in Moscow, Russia that is one of the country's most recognizable landmarks. Located in the historic centre of the country's capital city, the Kremlin comprises five palaces, four cathedrals, and an enclosing wall along with numerous towers. Within the complex is the Grand Kremlin Palace, which was one of the royal residences of the Tsar of Russia, and is now the residence of the president of the Russian Federation. The Kremlin overlooks the Moskva River to the south, Red Square to the east, and Alexander Garden to the west.

== Etymology and metonym ==
In the Russian language, kreml' denotes a 'fortress within a city', and there are many historical cities with a Kremlin of their own. However, the Moscow Kremlin, the best known, also serves an international-politics metonym that identifies the Government of Russia. During the Cold War (1947–1991), the term The Kremlin meant the Government of the Soviet Union and the term Kremlinology meant the study of the decisions of the Soviet leaders and of Russian and Soviet politics. When open to the public, supervised tours are offered of the Moscow Kremlin Museums.

== History ==
=== Origin ===
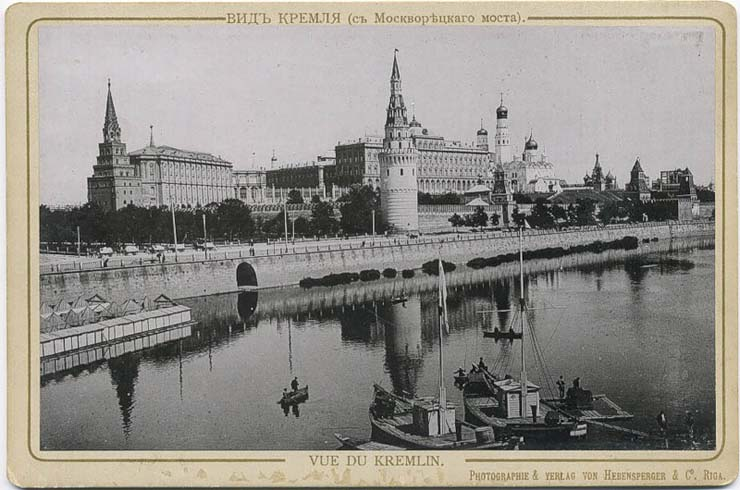
View of the Kremlin in 1890 during the Russian Empire

The site had been continuously inhabited by the Meryans since the 2nd century BCE. The Slavs occupied the south-western portion of Borovitsky Hill as early as the 11th century, as evidenced by a metropolitan seal from the 1090s which was unearthed by Soviet archaeologists in the area. The Vyatichi built a fortified structure (or "grad") on the hill where the Neglinnaya River flowed into the Moskva River.

Up to the 14th century, the site was known as the "grad of Moscow". The word "Kremlin" was first recorded in 1331 (though etymologist Max Vasmer mentions an earlier appearance in 1320). The grad was greatly extended by Prince Yuri Dolgorukiy in 1156, it was destroyed by the Mongols in 1237 and rebuilt in oak by Ivan I Kalita in 1339.

=== Seat of the grand dukes ===
Dmitri Donskoi replaced the oak palisade with a strong citadel of white limestone in 1366–1368 on the basic foundations of the current walls; this fortification withstood a siege by Khan Tokhtamysh. Dmitri's son Vasily I resumed construction of churches and cloisters in the Kremlin. The newly built Cathedral of the Annunciation was painted by Theophanes the Greek, Andrei Rublev, and Prokhor in 1406. The Chudov Monastery was founded by Dmitri's tutor, Metropolitan Alexis; while his widow, Eudoxia, established the Ascension Convent in 1397.

=== Residence of the tsars ===
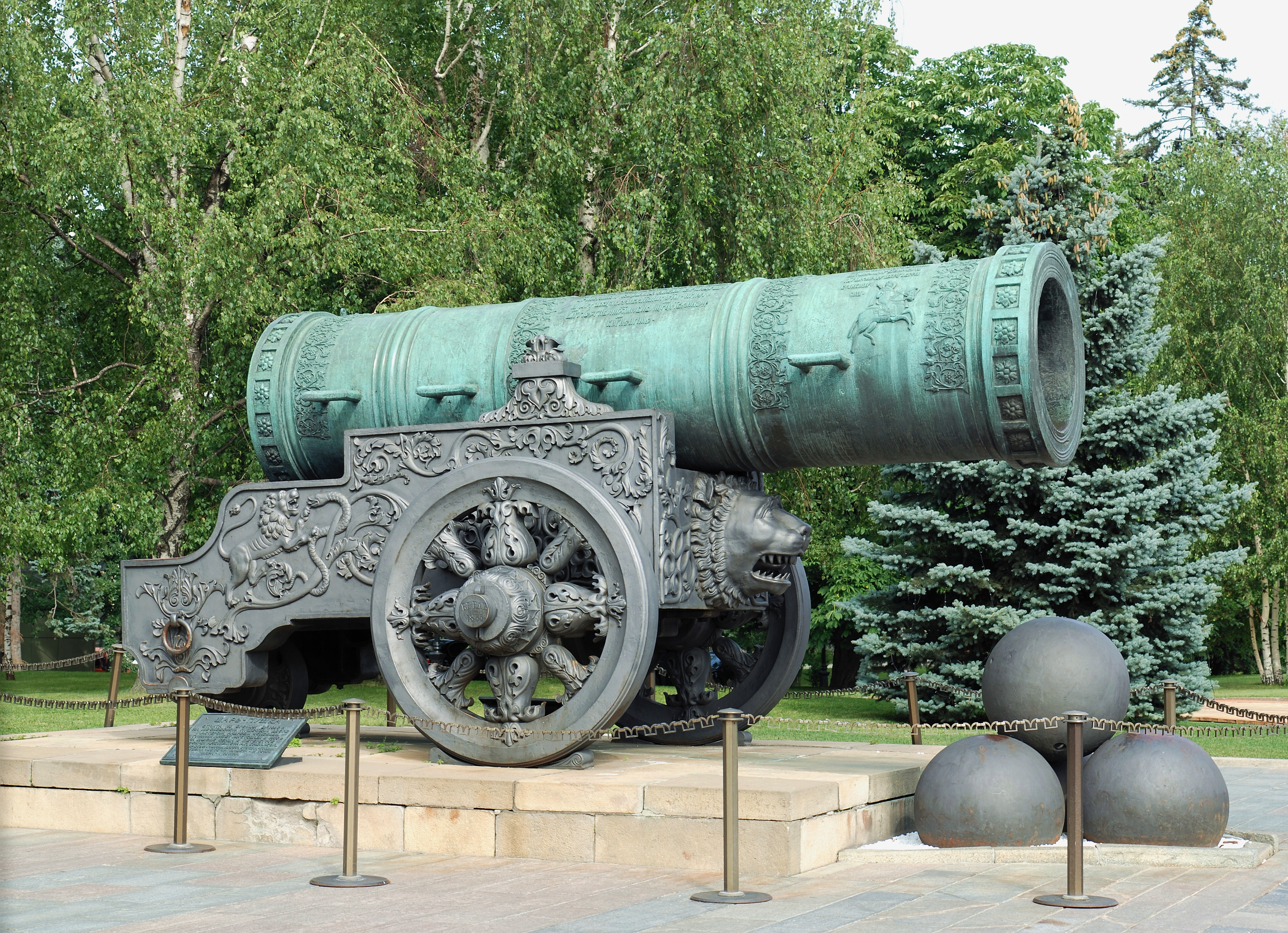
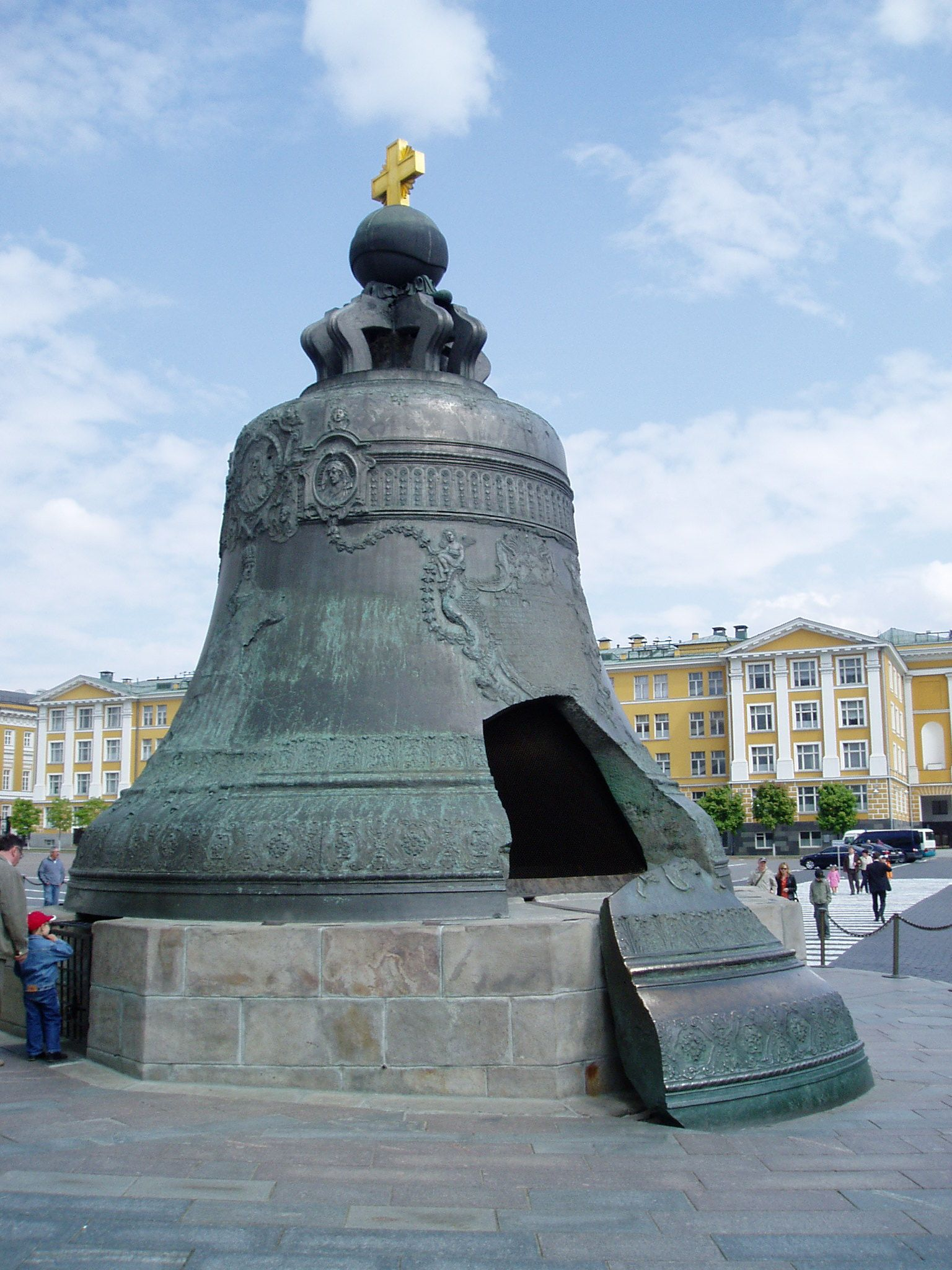
Tsar Cannon and Tsar Bell, two of the Kremlin's visitor attractions

Grand Prince Ivan III organised the reconstruction of the Kremlin, inviting a number of skilled architects from Renaissance Italy, including Pietro Antonio Solari, who designed the new Kremlin wall and its towers, and Marco Ruffo who designed the new palace for the prince. It was during his reign that three extant cathedrals of the Kremlin, the Deposition Church, and the Palace of Facets were constructed. The highest building of the city and Muscovite Russia was the Ivan the Great Bell Tower, built in 1505–1508 and augmented to its present height in 1600. The Kremlin walls as they now appear were built between 1485 and 1495. Spasskie gates of the wall still bear a dedication in Latin praising Pietro Antonio Solari for the design.

After construction of the new kremlin walls and churches was complete, the monarch decreed that no structures should be built in the immediate vicinity of the citadel. The Kremlin was separated from the walled merchant town (Kitay-gorod) by a 30-meter-wide moat, over which Saint Basil's Cathedral was constructed during the reign of Ivan the Terrible. The same tsar also renovated some of his grandfather's palaces, added a new palace and cathedral for his sons, and endowed the Trinity metochion inside the Kremlin. The metochion was administrated by the Trinity Monastery and contained the graceful tower church of St. Sergius, which was described by foreigners as one of the finest in the country.

During the Time of Troubles, the Kremlin was held by the Polish forces for two years, between 21 September 1610 and 26 October 1612. The Kremlin's liberation by the volunteer army of prince Dmitry Pozharsky and Kuzma Minin from Nizhny Novgorod paved the way for the election of Mikhail Romanov as the new tsar. During his reign and that of his son Alexis and grandson Feodor, the eleven-domed Upper Saviour Cathedral, Armorial Gate, Terem Palace, Amusement Palace and the palace of Patriarch Nikon were built. Following the death of Alexis's son, Feodor, and the Moscow Uprising of 1682, Tsar Peter escaped with much difficulty from the Kremlin and as a result developed a dislike for it. Three decades later in 1703, Peter abandoned the residence of his forefathers for his new capital, Saint Petersburg.

External images
- Graphic reconstruction of the Moscow fortress at the beginning of the 18th century
- Graphic reconstruction of the Moscow fortress at the beginning of the 19th century

The Golden Hall, a throne room with murals painted probably after 1547, was destroyed to make place for the Kremlin Palace, commissioned by Elizabeth of Russia and designed by the Italian architect Francesco Bartolomeo Rastrelli in 1752.

=== Imperial period ===
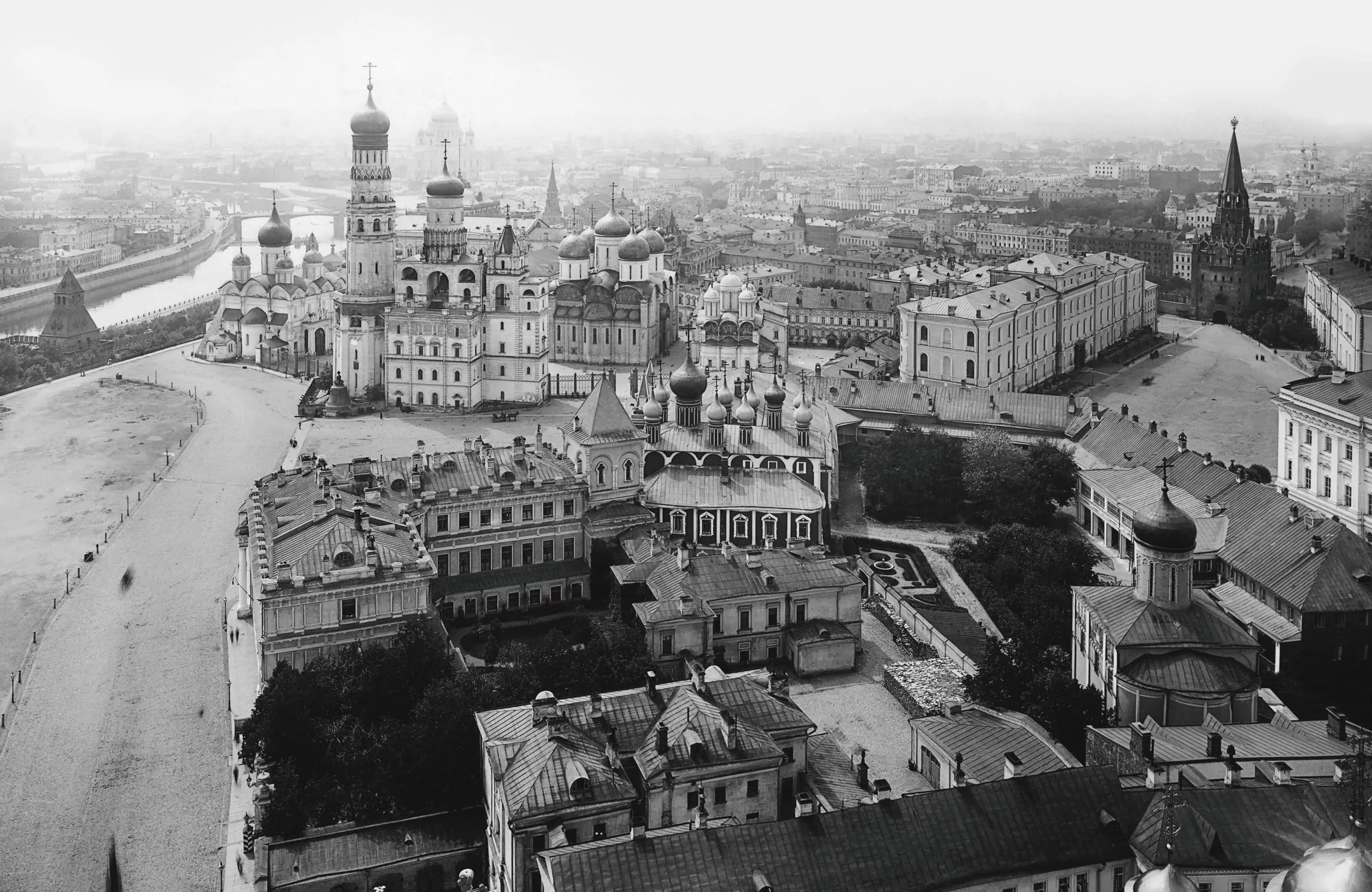
The Kremlin in 1910; many of the buildings were later demolished by the Soviet government.

Although still used for coronation ceremonies, the Kremlin was neglected until 1773, when Catherine the Great engaged Vasili Bazhenov to build her new residence there. Bazhenov produced a bombastic Neoclassical design on a heroic scale, which involved the demolition of several churches and palaces, as well as a portion of the Kremlin wall. After the preparations were over, construction was delayed due to lack of funds. Several years later the architect Matvey Kazakov supervised the reconstruction of the dismantled sections of the wall and of some structures of the Chudov Monastery and built the spacious and luxurious Offices of the Senate, since adapted for use as the principal workplace of the President of Russia.

During the Imperial period, from the early 18th and until the late 19th century, the Kremlin walls were traditionally painted white, in accordance with fashion.

French forces occupied the Kremlin from 2 September to 11 October 1812, following the French invasion of Russia. Subsequently, when Napoleon retreated from Moscow, he ordered the whole Kremlin to be blown up. The Kremlin Arsenal, several portions of the Kremlin Wall and several wall towers were destroyed by explosions and the Faceted Chamber and other churches were damaged by fire. Explosions continued for three days, from 21 to 23 October 1812. However, rain damaged the fuses, and the damage was less severe than intended. Restoration works were undertaken in 1816–1819, supervised by Osip Bove. During the remainder of the reign of Alexander I, several ancient structures were renovated in a fanciful neo-Gothic style, but many others, including all the buildings of the Trinity metochion, were condemned as "disused" or "dilapidated" and were torn down.

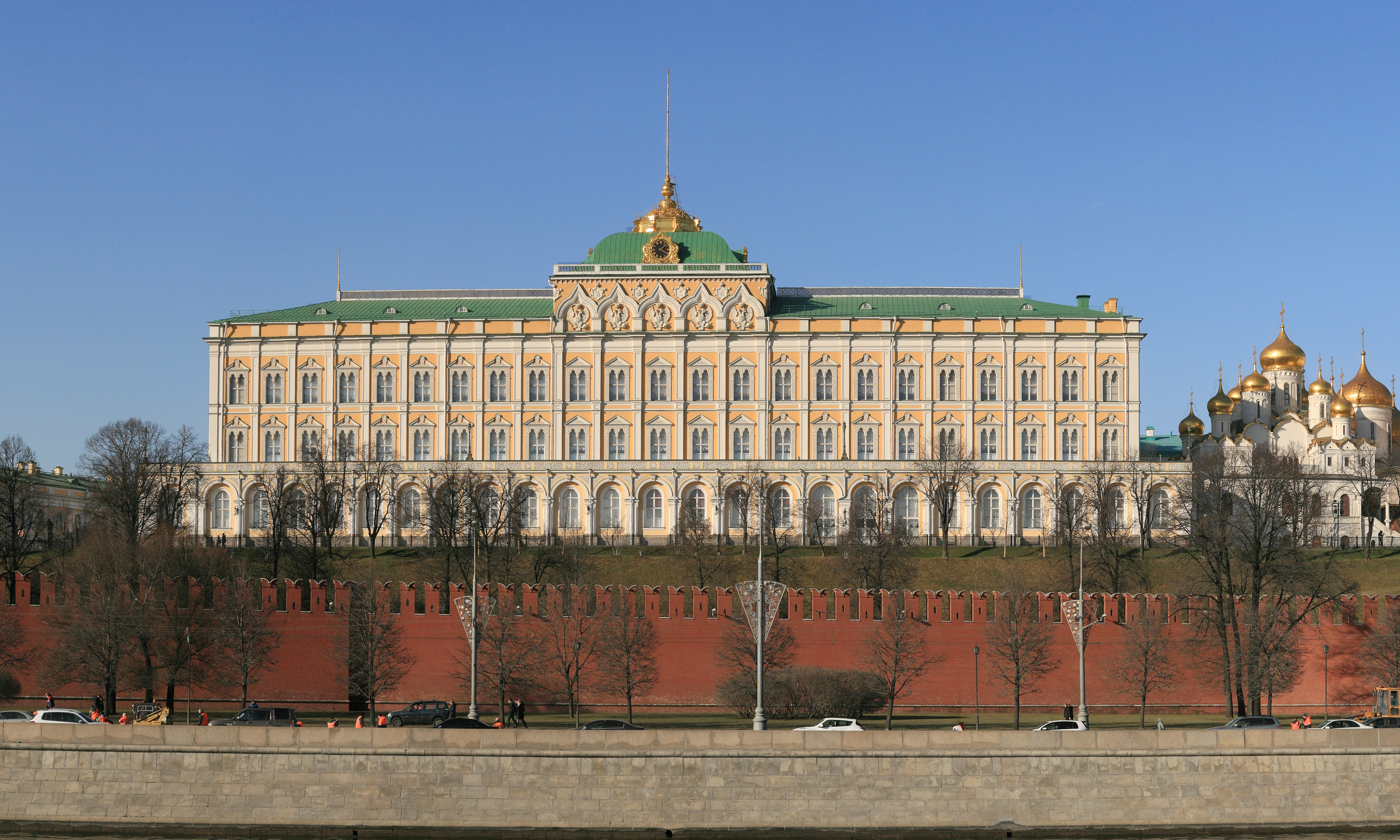
Grand Kremlin Palace, commissioned 1838 by Tsar Nicholas I, constructed 1839–1849, today the official residence of the President of Russia

On visiting Moscow for his coronation festivities, Tsar Nicholas I was not satisfied with the Grand Palace (alias Winter Palace), which had been erected in the 1750s to the design of Francesco Rastrelli. The elaborate Baroque structure was demolished, as was the nearby church of St. John the Precursor, built by Aloisio the New in 1508 in place of the first church constructed in Moscow. The architect Konstantin Thon was commissioned to replace them with the Grand Kremlin Palace, which was to rival the Winter Palace in St. Petersburg in its dimensions and in the opulence of its interiors. The palace was constructed in 1839–1849, followed by the re-building of the Kremlin Armoury in 1851.

After 1851 the Kremlin changed little until the Russian Revolution of 1917. The only new features added during this period were the Monument to Alexander II and a stone cross marking the spot where in 1905 Grand Duke Sergei Alexandrovich of Russia was assassinated by Ivan Kalyayev. These monuments were destroyed by the Bolsheviks in 1918.

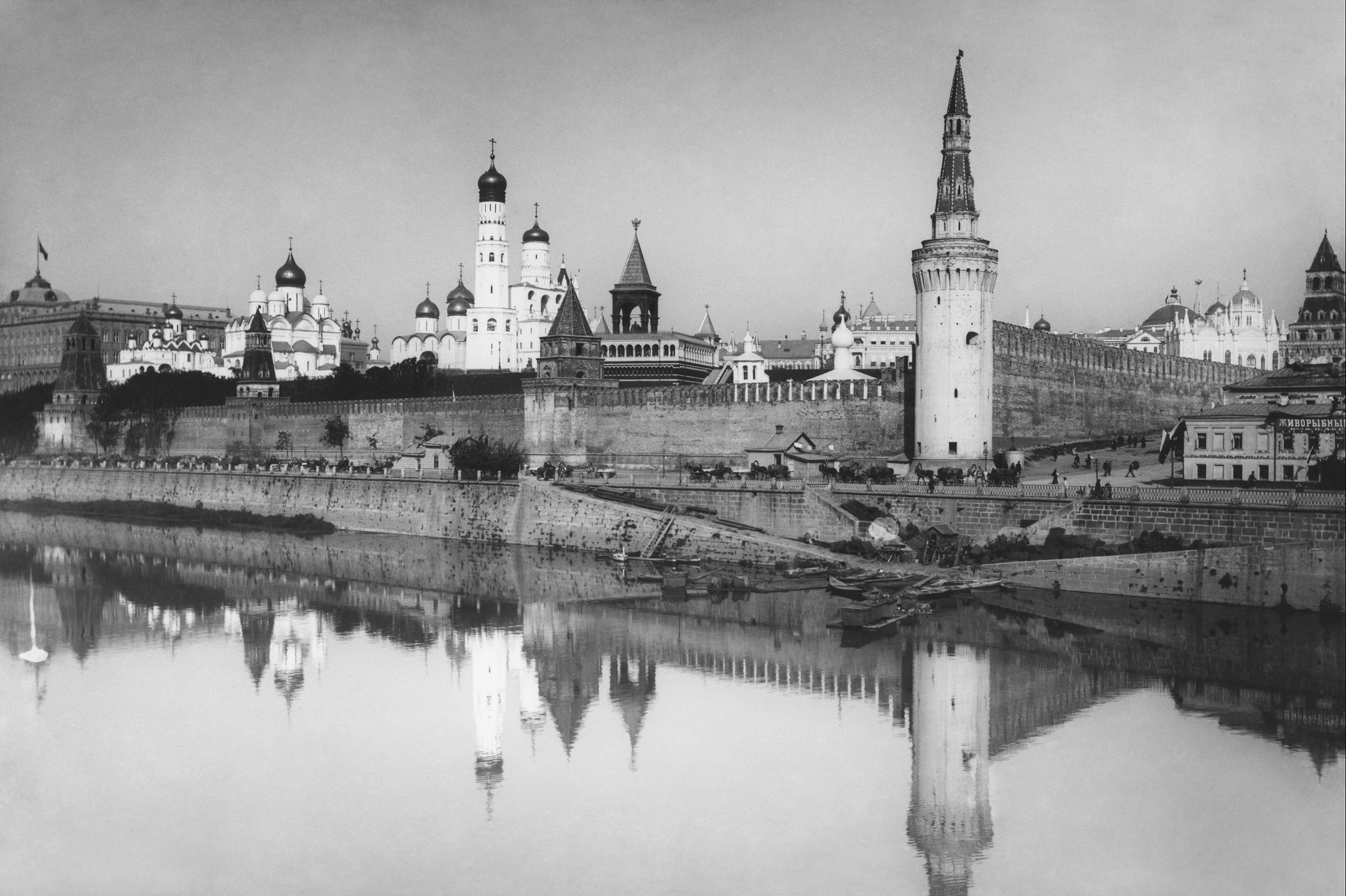
The Kremlin in the Russian Empire, 1898

=== Soviet period ===
The Soviet government moved from Petrograd (present-day Saint Petersburg) to Moscow on 12 March 1918. Vladimir Lenin selected the Kremlin Senate as his residence. Joseph Stalin also had his personal rooms in the Kremlin. He was eager to remove all the "relics of the tsarist regime" from his headquarters. Golden eagles on the towers were replaced by shining Kremlin stars, while the wall near Lenin's Mausoleum was turned into the Kremlin Wall Necropolis.

The Chudov Monastery and Ascension Convent, with their 16th-century cathedrals, were demolished to make room for the military school. The Little Nicholas Palace and the old Saviour Cathedral were pulled down as well.

During the Second World War, in order to confuse the German pilots, the towers were repainted with different colors and covered with wooden tents. Every roof was painted rusty brown so as to make them indistinguishable from typical roofs in the city. The grounds, paved with cobblestone, were covered up with sand. Tents painted to look like roofs were stretched over the gardens, and the facades of the buildings were also painted.

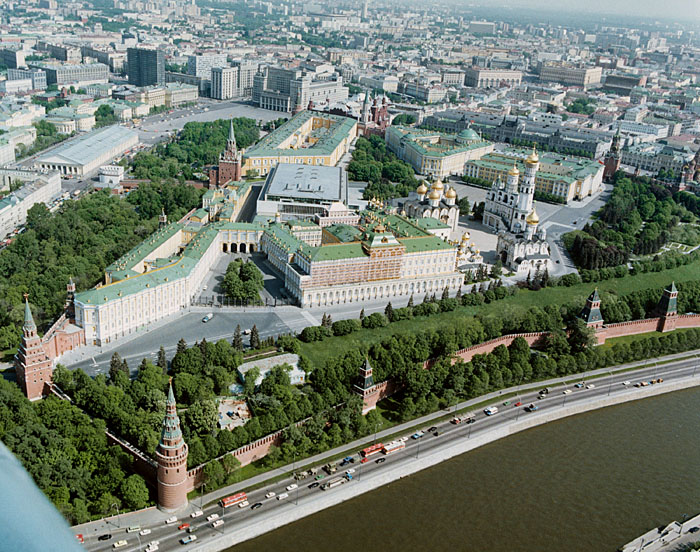
Kremlin in bird's-eye view in 1987

The residence of the Soviet government was closed to tourists until 1955. It was not until the Khrushchev Thaw that the Kremlin was reopened to foreign visitors. The Kremlin Museums were established in 1961, and the complex was among the first Soviet patrimonies inscribed on the World Heritage List in 1990.

Although the current director of the Kremlin Museums, Elena Gagarina (Yuri Gagarin's daughter), advocates a full-scale restoration of the destroyed cloisters, recent developments have been confined to expensive restoration of the original interiors of the Grand Kremlin Palace, which were altered during Stalin's rule.

Overall, during the Soviet rule (1917–1991), 28 out of 54 historic buildings in the Kremlin were destroyed (among them 17 out of 31 churches and cathedrals), most of them centuries-old.

==== State Kremlin Palace ====
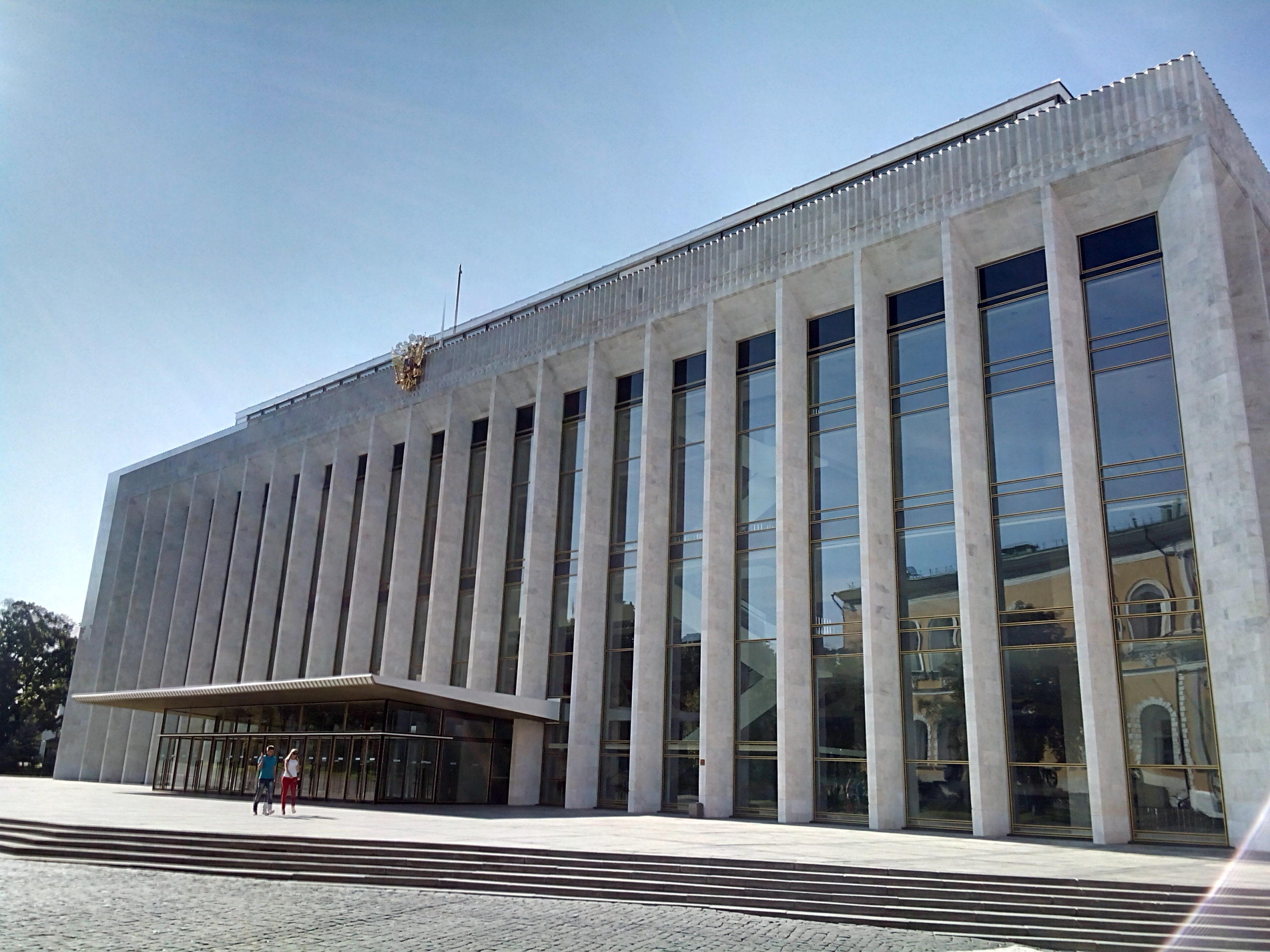
State Kremlin Palace (alias Kremlin Palace of Congresses), built 1959–1961

The State Kremlin Palace (alias Kremlin Palace of Congresses), was commissioned by Nikita Khrushchev as a modern arena for Communist Party meetings and was built within the Kremlin walls 1959–1961. Externally the palace is faced with white marble and the windows are tinted and reflective. The construction replaced several heritage buildings, including the old neo-classical building of the State Armoury, and some of the rear parts of the Grand Kremlin Palace. The Palace was constructed and integrated into the larger complex of the Great Kremlin Palace with walkways linking it to the Patriarchal Chambers and the Terem Palace.

== Buildings ==
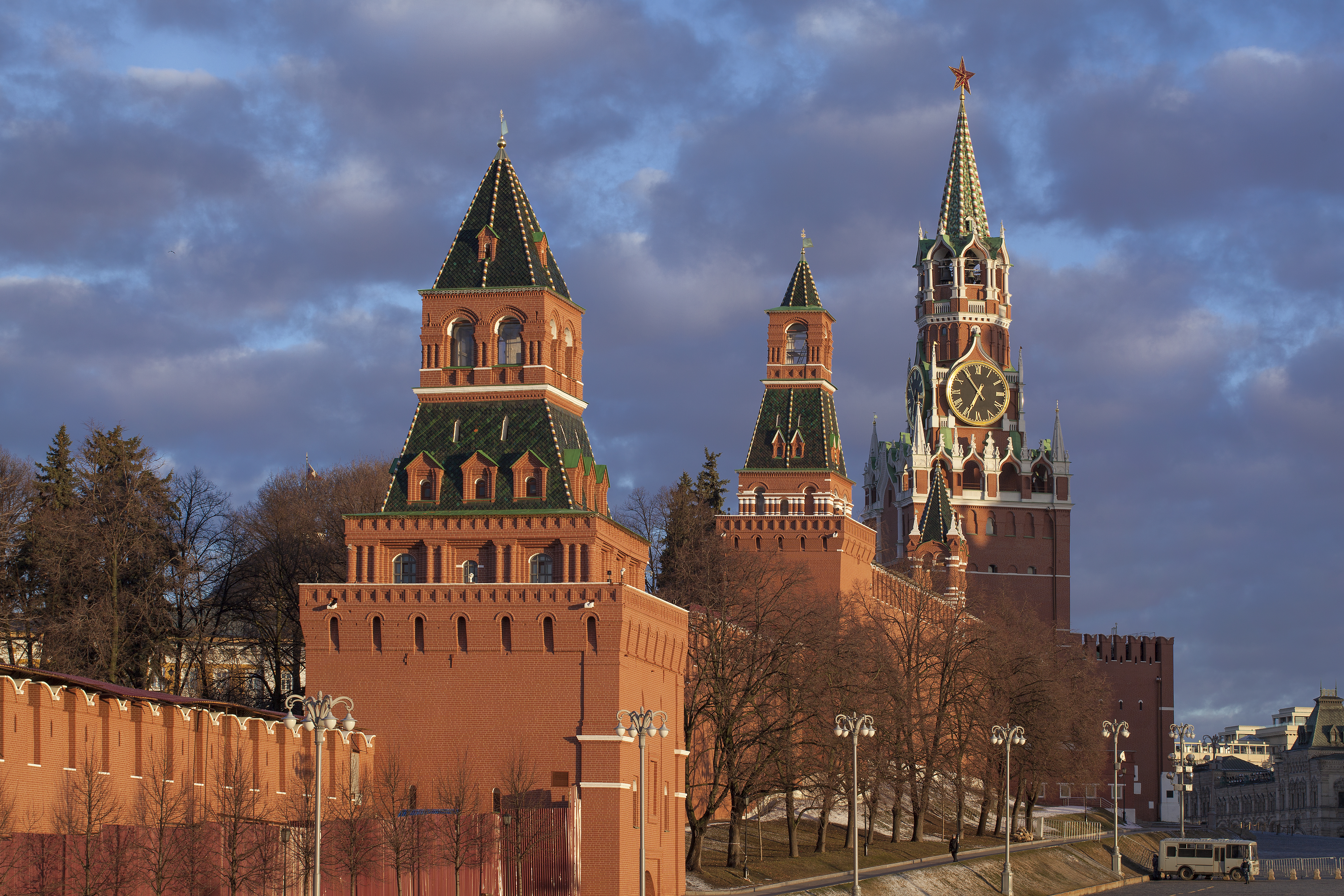
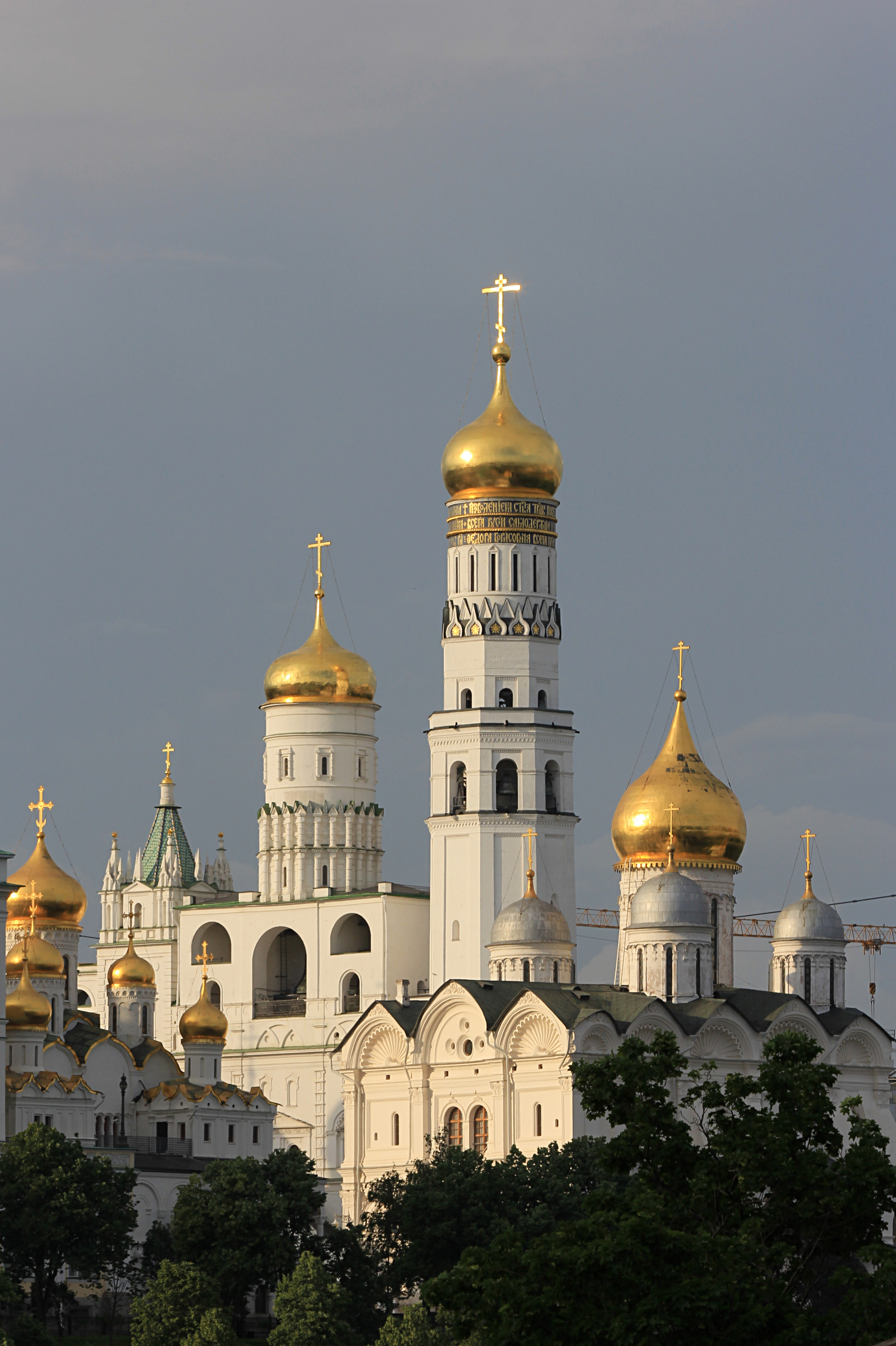
Two of the Kremlin's numerous historical buildings: Spasskaya Tower with one of the Kremlin stars on top, and the Ivan the Great Bell Tower

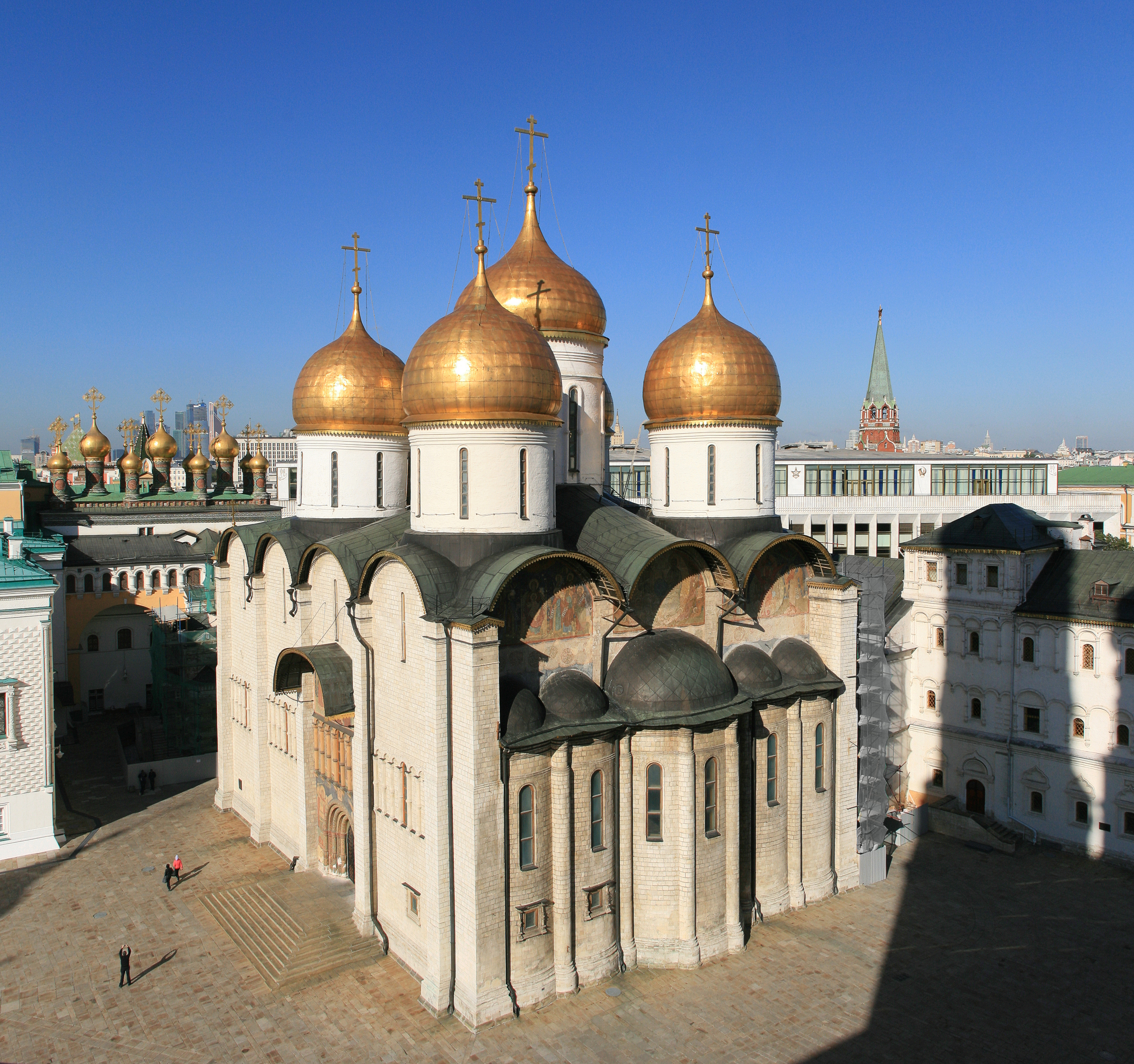
Dormition Cathedral, 2014

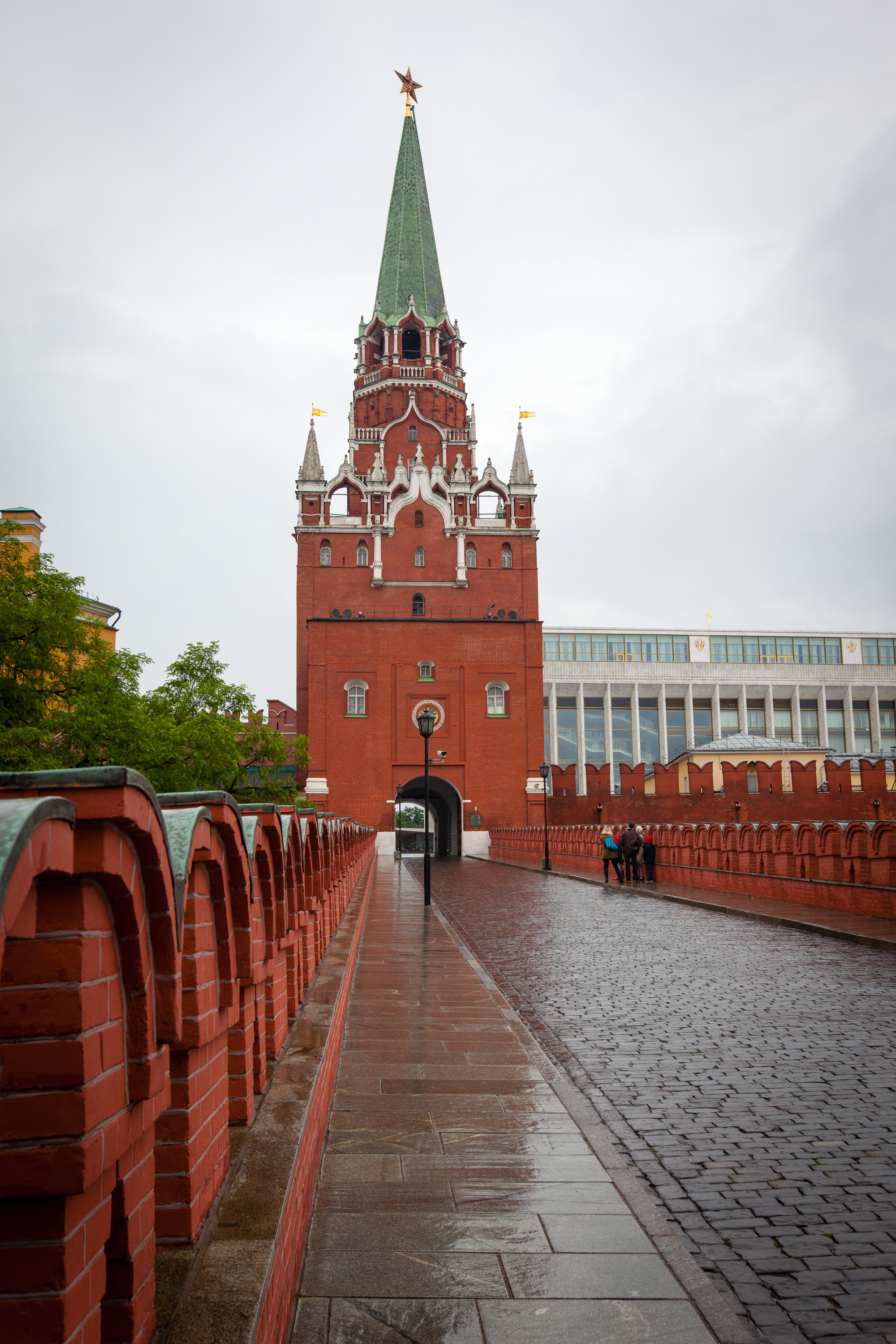
Troitskaya Tower (80 m or 260 ft), 2012

The existing Kremlin Wall and Kremlin towers were built by Italian masters from 1485 to 1495. The irregular triangle of the Kremlin Wall encloses an area of 275,000 square metres (2,960,000 sq ft). Its overall length is 2,235 metres (2,444 yards), but the height ranges from 5 to 19 metres (16 to 62 ft), depending on the terrain. The wall's thickness is between 3.5 and 6.5 metres (11 and 21 ft).

Originally there were eighteen Kremlin towers, but their number increased to twenty in the 17th century. All but three of the towers are square in plan. The highest tower is the Troitskaya, which was built to its present height of 80 metres (260 ft) in 1495. Most towers were originally crowned with wooden tents. The extant brick tents with strips of colored tiles date to the 1680s.

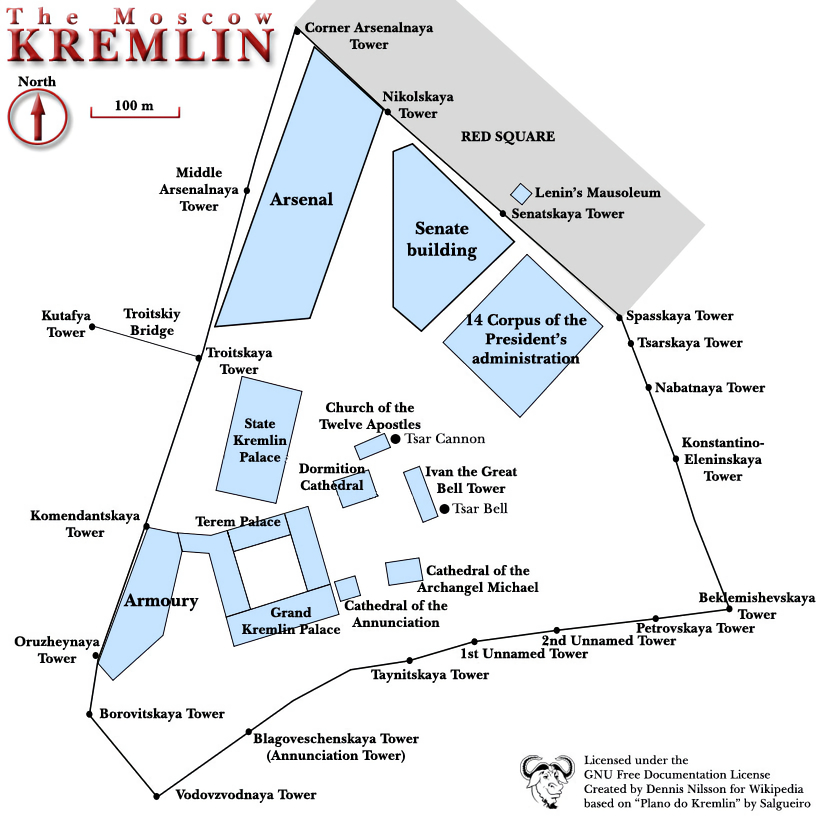
Map of Kremlin buildings

Cathedral Square is the heart of the Kremlin. It is surrounded by six buildings, including three cathedrals. The Cathedral of the Dormition was completed in 1479 to be the main church of Moscow and where all the Tsars were crowned. The massive limestone façade, capped with its five golden cupolas, was the design of Aristotele Fioravanti. Several important metropolitans and patriarchs are buried there, including Peter and Makarii. The gilded, three-domed Cathedral of the Annunciation was completed next in 1489, only to be reconstructed to a nine-domed design a century later. On the south-east of the square is the much larger Cathedral of the Archangel Michael (1508), where almost all the Muscovite monarchs from Ivan Kalita to Ivan V of Russia are interred. Also Boris Godunov was originally buried there but was moved to the Trinity Monastery.

There are two domestic churches of the Metropolitans and Patriarchs of Moscow, the Church of the Twelve Apostles (1653–1656) and the one-domed Church of the Deposition of the Virgin's Robe, built by Pskov artisans from 1484 to 1488 and featuring icons and frescoes from 1627 and 1644.

The other notable structure is the Ivan the Great Bell Tower on the north-east corner of the square, which is said to mark the exact centre of Moscow and resemble a burning candle. Completed in 1600, it is 81 metres (266 feet) high. Until the Russian Revolution, it was the tallest structure in the city, as construction of buildings taller than that was forbidden. Its 21 bells would sound the alarm if any enemy was approaching. The upper part of the structure was destroyed by the French during the Napoleonic Invasion in 1812 and has been rebuilt. The Tsar bell, the largest bell in the world, stands on a pedestal next to the tower.

The oldest secular structure still standing is Ivan III's Palace of Facets (1491), which holds the imperial thrones. The next oldest is the first home of the royal family, the Terem Palace. The original Terem Palace was also commissioned by Ivan III, but most of the existing palace was built in the 17th century. The Terem Palace and the Palace of Facets are linked by the Grand Kremlin Palace. This was commissioned by Nicholas I in 1838. The largest structure in the Kremlin, it cost 11 million rubles to build and more than one billion dollars to renovate in the 1990s. It contains reception halls, a ceremonial red staircase, private apartments of the tsars, and the lower story of the Resurrection of Lazarus church (1393), which is the oldest extant structure in the Kremlin and the whole of Moscow.

The northern corner of the Kremlin is occupied by the Arsenal, which was built for Peter the Great in 1701. The southwestern section of the Kremlin holds the Armoury building. Built in 1851 to a Renaissance Revival design, it is currently a museum housing Russian state Regalia and Diamond Fund.

The haloalkaliphilic methylotrophic bacterium Methylophaga muralis (first called Methylophaga murata) was first isolated from deteriorating marble in the Kremlin.

=== Helipad ===
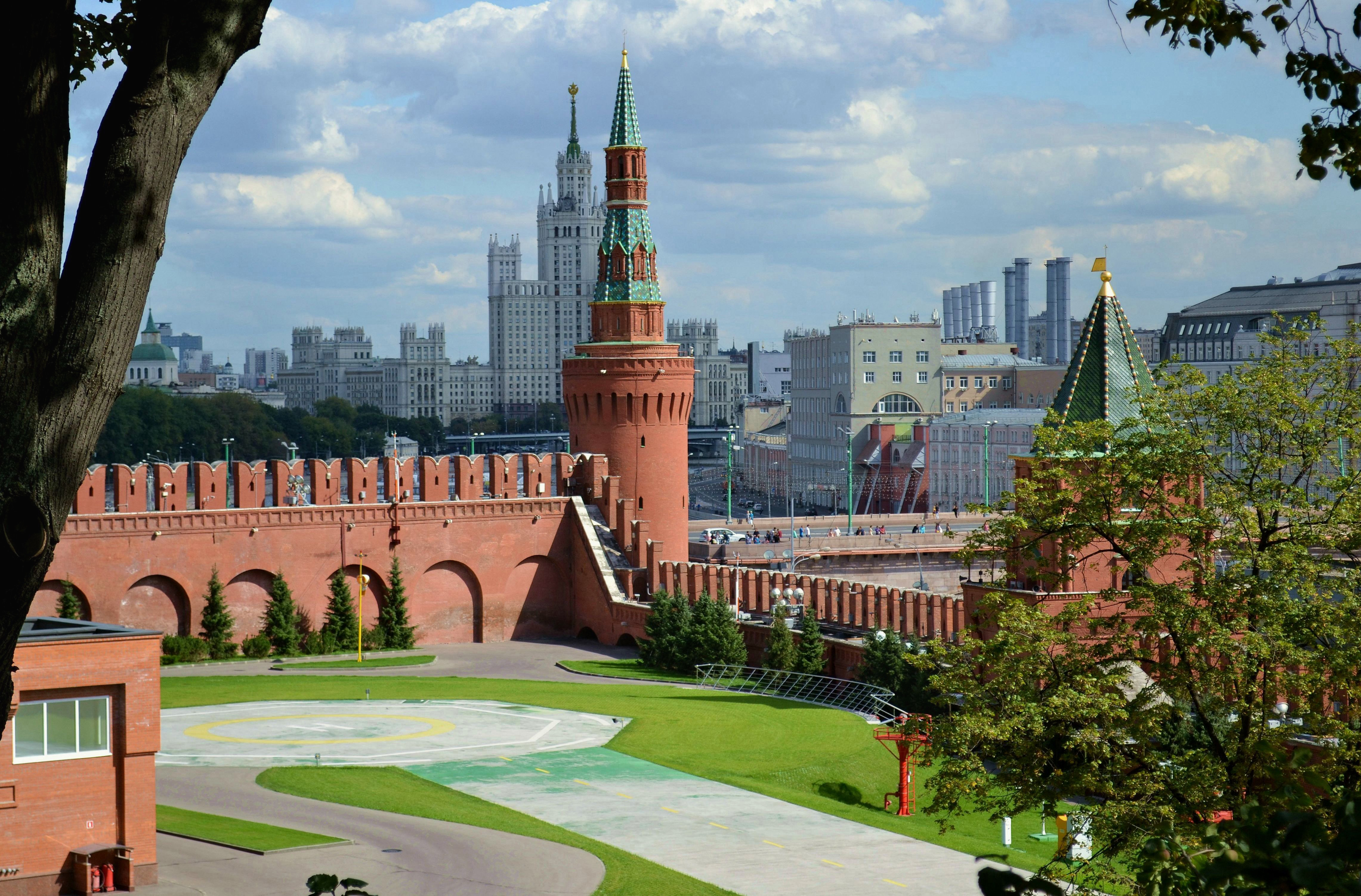
Helipad at the Kremlin, 2014

To stop disruptions to traffic caused by motorcades, Russian President Vladimir Putin authorized the construction of a helipad within the Kremlin grounds. The helipad was completed in May 2013. The Russian President will now typically commute back and forth to the Kremlin using a Mil Mi-8 helicopter. Careful consideration was taken in choosing the location of the helipad; its location is said to be of no threat to the architecture of the Kremlin.

== Stations of the Moscow Metro ==
The nearest Moscow Metro stations to the Kremlin are: Okhotny Ryad and Biblioteka Imeni Lenina (Sokolnicheskaya Line), Teatralnaya (Zamoskvoretskaya Line), Ploshchad Revolyutsii (Arbatsko-Pokrovskaya Line), Arbatskaya (Arbatsko-Pokrovskaya Line), Alexandrovsky Sad (Filyovskaya Line), and Borovitskaya (Serpukhovsko-Timiryazevskaya Line).

== See also ==
- Saint Basil's Cathedral, sometimes mistaken for the Kremlin, also located on Red Square.
