= Kremlingate =

Kremlingate may refer to:

- Kremlingate, a 1990s scandal involving the Moscow-based Bank Menatep
- Russian interference in the 2016 United States elections
- Links between Trump associates and Russian officials

== See also ==
- Armorial Gate, a former monument at the Moscow Kremlin
- List of scandals with "-gate" suffix
- Russiagate (disambiguation)
