= Goryachev =

Goryachev (Russian: Горячев, from горячий meaning hot) is a Russian masculine surname, its feminine counterpart is Goryacheva. It may refer to

- Anastasia Goryacheva, Russian ballerina
- Grisha Goryachev (born 1977), Russian guitarist
- Ksenia Goryacheva (born 1996), Russian politician
- Nikolay Goryachev (1883–1940), Russian astronomer
  - 5075 Goryachev, a minor planet named after Nikolay
- Sergey Goryachev (1970–2023), Russian military officer
- Svetlana Goryacheva (born 1947), Russian politician
- Valentina Goryacheva (1935–2020), wife of astronaut Yuri Gagarin
- Yelisey Goryachev (1892–1938), Soviet military officer
- Yevgeni Goryachev (born 1992), Russian football player
