= Russiagate (disambiguation) =

Russiagate may refer to:

== Politics ==
- Russian interference in the 2016 United States elections#Trump's "Russiagate hoax" claims
- Russia investigation origins conspiracy theory, conservative conspiracy theories casting doubt about Russia interfering in the 2016 United States presidential election
- 2019 allegations over Italian political party Lega accepting Russian funding

== Banking ==
- A late 1990s scandal in which billions of dollars were laundered out of Russia with the assistance of Western banks such as the Bank of New York

== See also ==
- Kremlingate (disambiguation)
- List of scandals with "-gate" suffix
