= Moscow Kremlin Museums =

Museum in Moscow, Russia

Coordinates: 55°44′07″N 37°37′03″E

- Музеи Московского Кремля
- Established: 1806
- Location: Kremlin, Moscow, Russia
- Director: Yelena Gagarina
- Website: kreml.ru/museums-moscow-kremlin

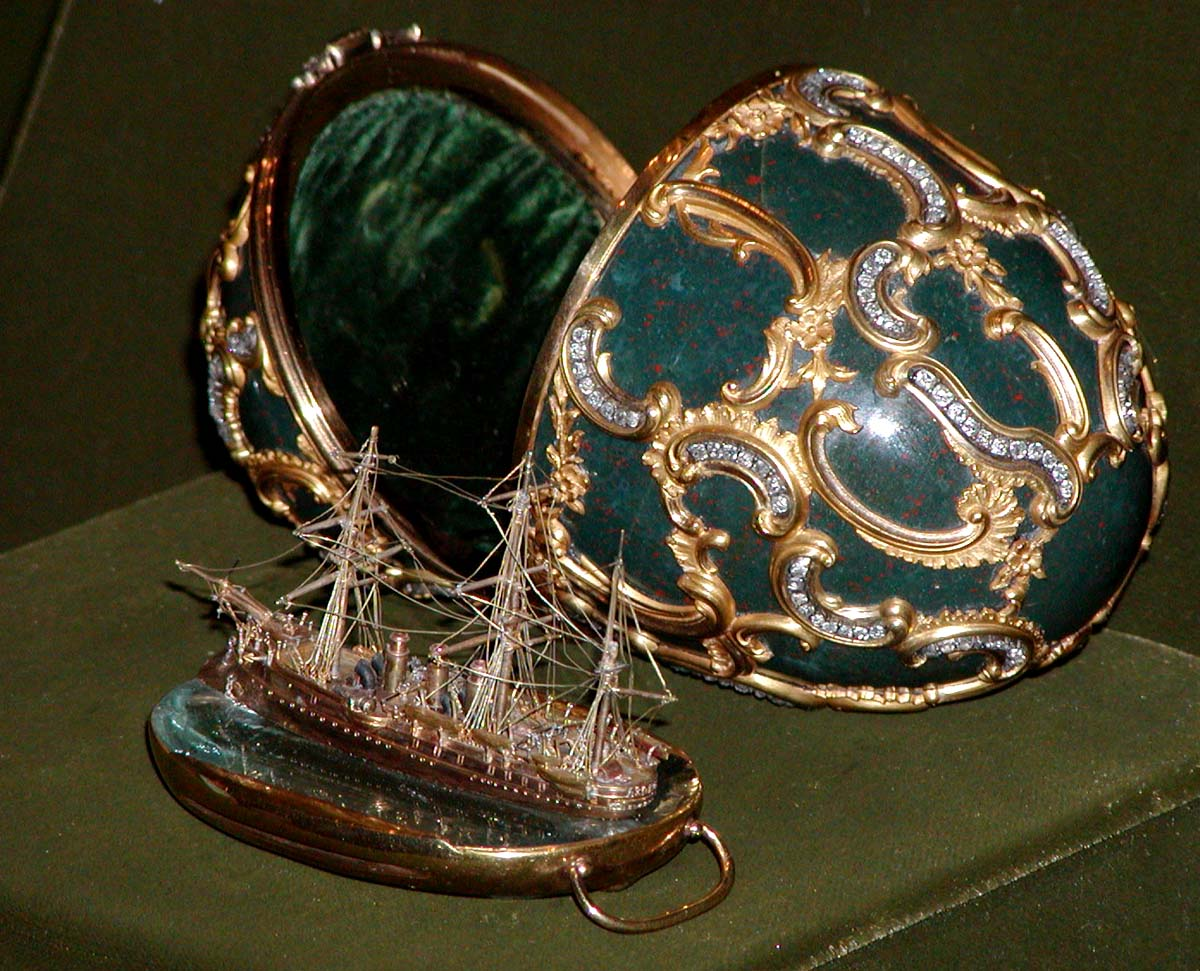
Memory of Azov (Fabergé egg with a model of ship in the Kremlin Armoury)

Moscow Kremlin Museums (Russian: Музеи Московского Кремля (MMK), Государственный историко-культурный музей-заповедник «Московский Кремль») is a major state-run museum in Moscow Kremlin. Its roots lie in the Kremlin Armoury museum founded in 1806, the current form of the museum started in 1991. The Head of the museum (since 2001) is Yelena Gagarina, daughter of cosmonaut Yuri Gagarin. There were 424,922 visitors to the Kremlin Museums in 2020, a drop of 86 percent from 2019 due to the COVID-19 pandemic, but it still ranked 46th on the List of most-visited art museums in the world in 2020.

Moscow Kremlin Museums have the following parts:

- Kremlin Armoury (Оружейная палата)
- Diamond Fund (Алмазный фонд)
- Dormition Cathedral (Успенский Собор)
- Cathedral of the Archangel (Архангельский собор)
- Cathedral of the Annunciation (Благовещенский собор)
- Residence of Patriarchs and Church of the Twelve Apostles (Патриарший дворец и церковь Двенадцати апостолов)
- Church of the Deposition of the Robe (Церковь Ризоположения)
- Ivan the Great Bell Tower (Колокольня Ивана Великого)

== History ==
The Moscow Kremlin State Historical and Cultural Museum and Heritage Site consists of the Armoury Chamber and Cathedral Square. Within Cathedral Square is Assumption, Archangel and Annunciation cathedral, the Church of Laying Our Lady's Holy Robe, the Patriarch's Palace with the Twelve Apostles’ Church and the ‘Ivan the Great’ Bell Tower complex, as well as the exhibition halls in the Assumption Belfry and in on the One-Pillar Chamber of the Patriarch Palace. During Napoleon's invasion of Russia, many cultural objects were damaged, ruined, lost or relocated.

The museum's first exposition was open to visitors in 1814. Emperor Nicholas I changed the name of the museum to “The Moscow Armoury Chambers on the August 22, 1831.

== Structures ==
=== Armoury Chamber ===
The Armoury Chamber is part of the Grand Kremlin Palace's complex. It is in the building contracted by architect Konstantin Ton in 1851. The Armoury stores the bases of the museum collections. It preserves ancient state regalia, ceremonial royal clothes and coronation dresses, vestments of Russian Orthodox Church hierarchs, gold and silverware made by Russian craftsman, West European artistic silver, ceremonial arms and armor, carriages and horse ceremonial harnesses.

=== Assumption Cathedral ===
The Assumption Cathedral is in Cathedral Square where it is surrounded by Old Russian architecture: cathedrals and churches, the Ivan the Great Bell-Tower, the Facets Palace and the Patriarch's Palace. The cathedral is dedicated to the Feast of the Dormition of the Theotokos and Ever-Virgin Mary and was built as the principal church of the Russian state. In 1326, the first Moscow Metropolitan Peter ordered the quarters to be relocated from Vladimir to Moscow. A new building was constructed in 1479 by decree of Grand Prince of Russia Ivan III.

For six centuries, the Assumption Cathedral has been the national and religious center of Russia. The Assumption Cathedral walls are filled with murals by painters from around the world and eventually it was filled with a collection of Russian medieval art monuments. After the Revolution of 1917, the Assumption church became a museum. Divine services were resumed in the cathedral in 1990.

=== Archangel Cathedral ===
The Archangel Cathedral was constructed from 1505 to 1508 by Italian Architect Aloisio Novyi. The cathedral was built to signify the end of Mongol rule and the strength of the grand princes of Russia.

=== Annunciation Cathedral ===
The Annunciation Cathedral was built in 1484-1489 during the reign of the Sovereign of All Russia Ivan III. The cathedral was consecrated in honor of the Annunciation Day devoted to the announcement by the Archangel Gabriel to the Virgin Mary that she was going to give birth to the son of God. In 1508, on decree of Great Prince Vasily Ivanovich, the domes were gilded. The Annunciation Cathedral served as the private chapel of the Moscow great princes and tsars for centuries. After the 1917 Revolution, the cathedral was closed, and the Kremlin Museum took over the care of the cathedral.

=== Patriarch's Palace ===
In 1450, Metropolitan Jonah built the Church of Deposition of the Virgin's Robe, however a fire in 1473 destroyed the entire residence. Pskov architects built a new Church of Deposition of the Virgin's Robe from 1484 to 1485. Another fire in 1626 damaged the Patriarchal Court and restorations began in 1643 at the times of Patriarch Joseph. When the patriarchates and the institutions of the Holy Synod, the Moscow Synodal Office was located there in the 18th – 19th centuries. It was not until 1918 that the Patriarch's Palace was transferred to the jurisdiction of the museum.

=== Church of the Deposition of the Virgin's Robe ===
The Church of the Deposition of the Virgin's Robe is between the Assumption Cathedral and the Faceted Chamber. For centuries, the church was part of the metropolitan household and a private chapel for Russian Metropolitans and Patriarchs.

=== 'Ivan the Great' Bell Tower ===
The Bell Tower took over three hundred years to complete and consists of the ‘Ivan the Great’ Bell Tower, the Assumption Belfry and the Filaret's Annex. It was built from 1505 to 1508. In his retreat from Moscow, Napoleon's Army blew up the bell tower, however it survived and only the Belfry and the Filaret's Annex were destroyed. These were rebuilt to their original dimensions in 1814–1815.

== Outreach ==
The Moscow Kremlin Museum and the Kansas International Museum worked together to transport an exhibit to Topeka, KS in 2002.

== See also ==
- List of most visited art museums
