= Armorial Gate =

Former monument at the Moscow Kremlin

Coordinates: 55°45′1″N 37°36′53″E

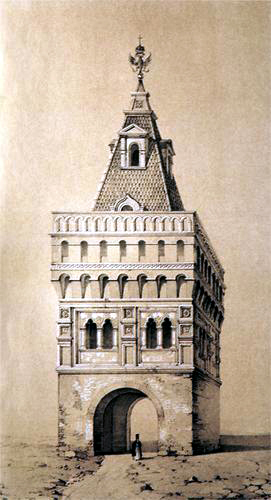
Armorial Gate, c. 1801

The Armorial Gate (Russian: Гербовые ворота, romanized: Gerbovye vorota) was a unique monumental erection of traditional Russian architecture. Situated in the Moscow Kremlin, the structure was symbolic of the centralized Russian state. Its name references polychrome tiles of the second floor, which displayed heraldic (armorial) emblems of formerly independent Russian principalities.

When constructing a palace for Ivan III in the late 15th century, the Italian architect Aloisio built an interior brick wall inside the Kremlin to defend the royal palace from south and west. The western wall was pierced by two arches, the smaller for pedestrians and the larger for vehicles. The larger gate was called Kolymazhnye, either from the old Russian word for vehicles or from the Kolymazhny Chamber situated nearby.

After the Romanov family ascended the throne in 1613, they rebuilt Ivan's residence into the Terem Palace. At about the same time, in the 1630s, they commissioned a tower to crown the Kolymazhnye Gate leading to the royal court.

The tower was square in plan, with the first floor pierced by a wide arch for vehicles. The second floor had twin double-arched windows with decorative elaborations of white stone. The third floor was pierced by a row of machicolations and a row of murder-holes. Above that was a gallery ringed by a perforated parapet. The structure was crowned by a tiled tent, decorated with two levels of dormers and surmounted by a heraldic double-headed eagle.

By the 19th century, the wall had lost its defensive purpose and was dismantled. After that, the detached tower appeared redundant and was pulled down at the urging of the Kremlin's castellan in 1807.

== Architectural features ==
The square in plan tower was divided into four floors. The ground floor had two entrance arches with iron gates. The first floor was a spacious hall without ceilings. The third storey was notable for the complexity of the engineering construction, as it served as the base of the stone top. From outside it was surrounded with two defence belts: from below there were lines with machicolations, and from above - with sunken arrowslit. Above them was a parapet-fenced gallery with a wooden floor.

Like almost all towers of the Kremlin in the XVII century, the composition was completed by a decorative tiled tent with watchtowers. Two rows of windows in the Renaissance style and a copper gilt coat of arms on an "apple" crowned the composition. The watchmen who guarded the tsar's chambers also kept watch over the city and sounded the alarm in case of fire.

The outside of each floor was decorated individually, the decor of the facade being lush and featuring an unusual mixture of styles. The second tier was decorated with white-stone carvings and pairs of shaped windows, typical of oriental architecture. They were surrounded by coats of arms with the symbols Astrakhan, Veliky Novgorod, Vyatka, Nizhny Novgorod, Kazan, Perm, Pskov, Smolensk, Tver, Chernigov, Ugra and Bulgaria. Thanks to these tiles by the end of the XVIII century the tower and received the name of Armorial.

== Sources ==
- (in Russian) Official website of the Kremlin museums
