= Valentina Ivanovna Gagarina =

Soviet/Russian author (1935–2020)

Valentina Gagarina
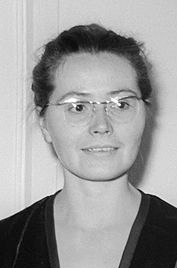
- Born: Valentina Ivanovna Goryacheva; December 15, 1935; Orenburg, Orenburg Oblast, Russian SFSR, Soviet Union
- Died: March 17, 2020 (aged 84)
- Resting place: Federal Military Memorial Cemetery
- Notable work: 108 минут и вся жизнь
- Spouse: Yuri Gagarin (m. 1957; died 1968)
- Children: 2; including Yelena

Valentina Ivanovna Gagarina (Russian: Валенти́на Ива́новна Гага́рина, née Goryacheva; December 15, 1935 – March 17, 2020) was the wife of the first cosmonaut Yuri Gagarin.

== Biography ==
Valentina Goryacheva was born on December 15, 1935, in Orenburg, in the Goryachev family. Her father, Ivan Stepanovich (1894–1960), was from Orenburg, worked as a chef at a sanatorium, and for some time worked at the CPSU Central Committee Catering Combine. Her mother, Varvara Semyonovna (1895–1961) from Ryazan Province, was a housewife. In the family there were six children: three boys and three girls. Valentina was the youngest. The brothers, the older Aleksey and the younger Michael, were killed in the war while the middle one, Ivan, fought in the Far East.

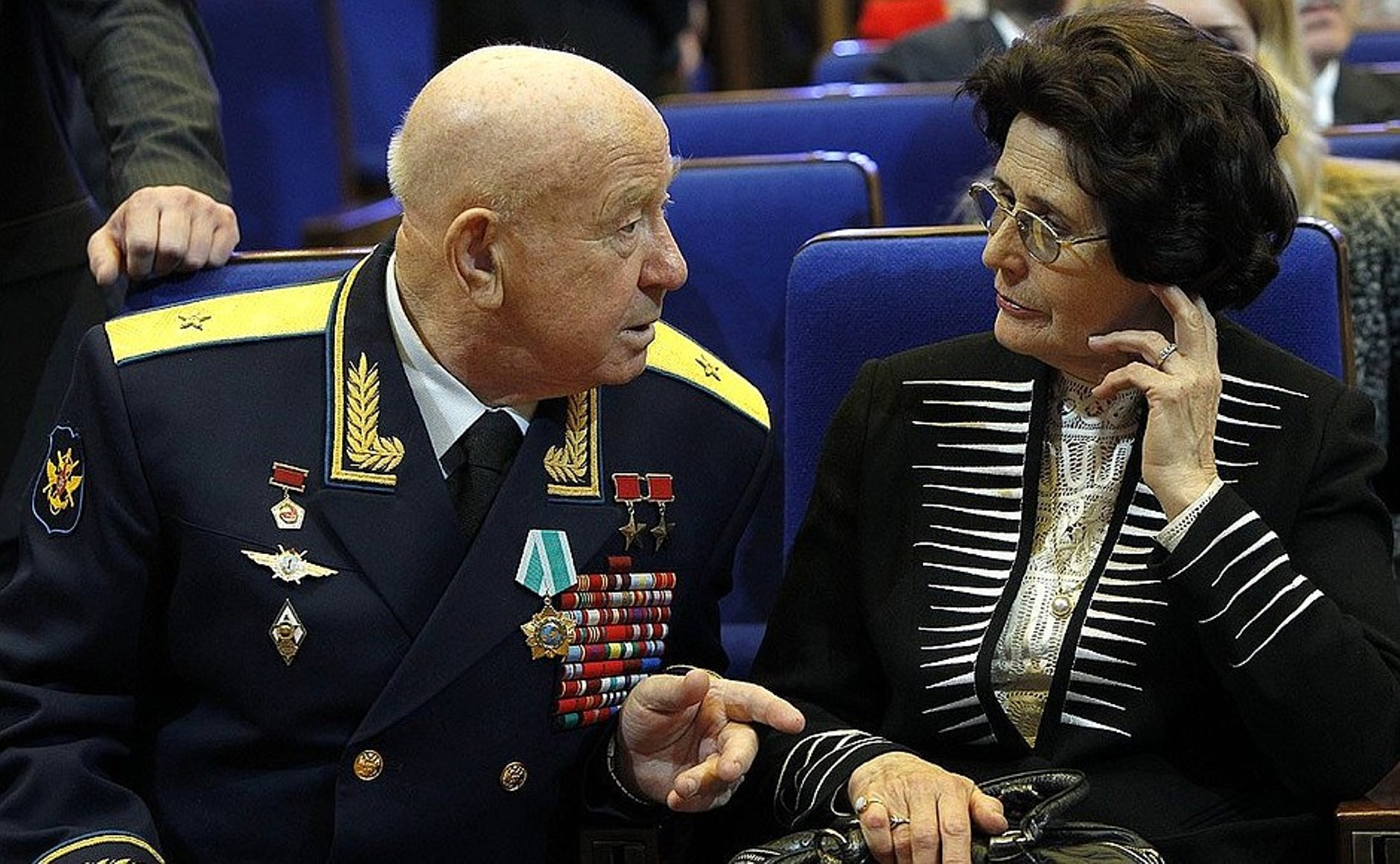
Alexei Leonov and Yury Gagarin’s widow Valentina Gagarina

She graduated from the Orenburg Medical School and worked in the Medical Control Laboratory of the Mission Control Center.

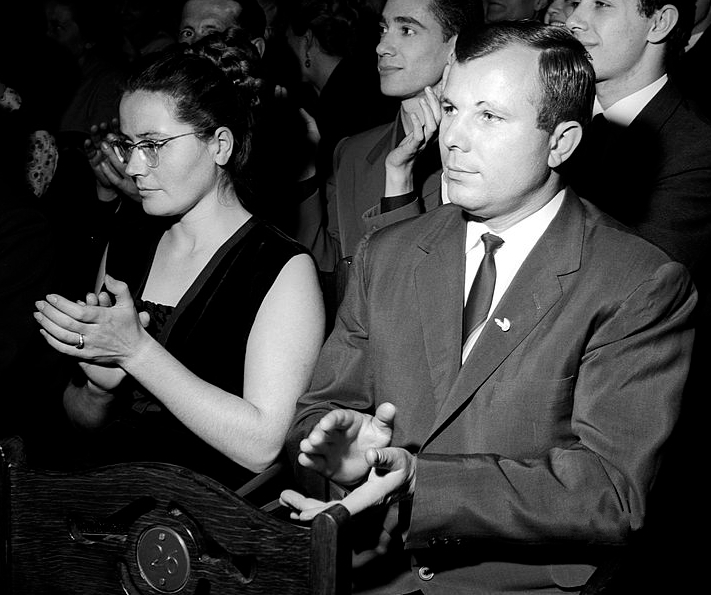
Valentina Gagarina and her husband, cosmonaut Yuri Gagarin, in 1964

On October 27, 1957, in Orenburg, she married aviator Yuri Gagarin. In their house, a museum-apartment of Yuri and Valentina Gagarin was later opened. The Gagarins had two daughters, Yelena and Galina. On April 12, 1961 her husband was the first in the world to fly into space and became world famous. The fame reached his family too; they were often photographed, shown on TV, interviewed, they were visited by different famous people of those years: politicians, cosmonauts, artists, singers. On April 14, 1961, she was captured in photos and video footage sitting next to Yuri Gagarin and Nikita Khrushchev in an open-top car that drove through the streets of Moscow, surrounded by cheering crowds of Moscovites.

After Yuri Gagarin's death on March 27, 1968, she never married again.

In 1976 she gave Yuri Gagarin's personal belongings to the museum: full dress jacket, all the awards and documents, presents, special editions of Pravda, Izvestiya, Red Star, Sovetskaya Kultura, Literaturnaya Gazeta, Moskovsky Komsomolets of April 12–13, 1961.

She participated in events dedicated to the first cosmonaut, met with the first people of the country.

In 1981, Gagarina wrote her first book in memory of Gagarin: 108 minutes and the whole life. V.I. Gagarina's memoirs were repeatedly published.

She lived in Zvezdny Gorodok in Shchelkovsky district of Moscow region, in the apartment which Gagarin received in March 1968. From windows of the apartment on the fourth floor one can see a monument to Gagarin clutching a daisy in his palm. She had a large ara parrot, which Yuri Gagarin had, and was friends with Valentina Tereshkova.

She died on March 17, 2020. She was buried on March 20 at the Federal Military Memorial Cemetery in Mytishchi.

== Awards ==
- 1961 – Order of Lenin (awarded at the initiative of Khrushchev as the wife of the first cosmonaut).
- 2011 – Order of Gagarin of the Russian Cosmonautics Federation.
- 2017 – Honorary Citizen of the Moscow Region.

== Publications ==
- 1984 — Каждый год 12 апреля — М.: Советская Россия.
- 1986 — 108 минут и вся жизнь — М.: Молодая гвардия. тир. 50000 экз

== See also ==
- Gagarin, I loved you
