= Church of the Deposition of the Robe =

Coordinates: 55°45′2″N 37°36′59″E

- Церковь Ризоположения
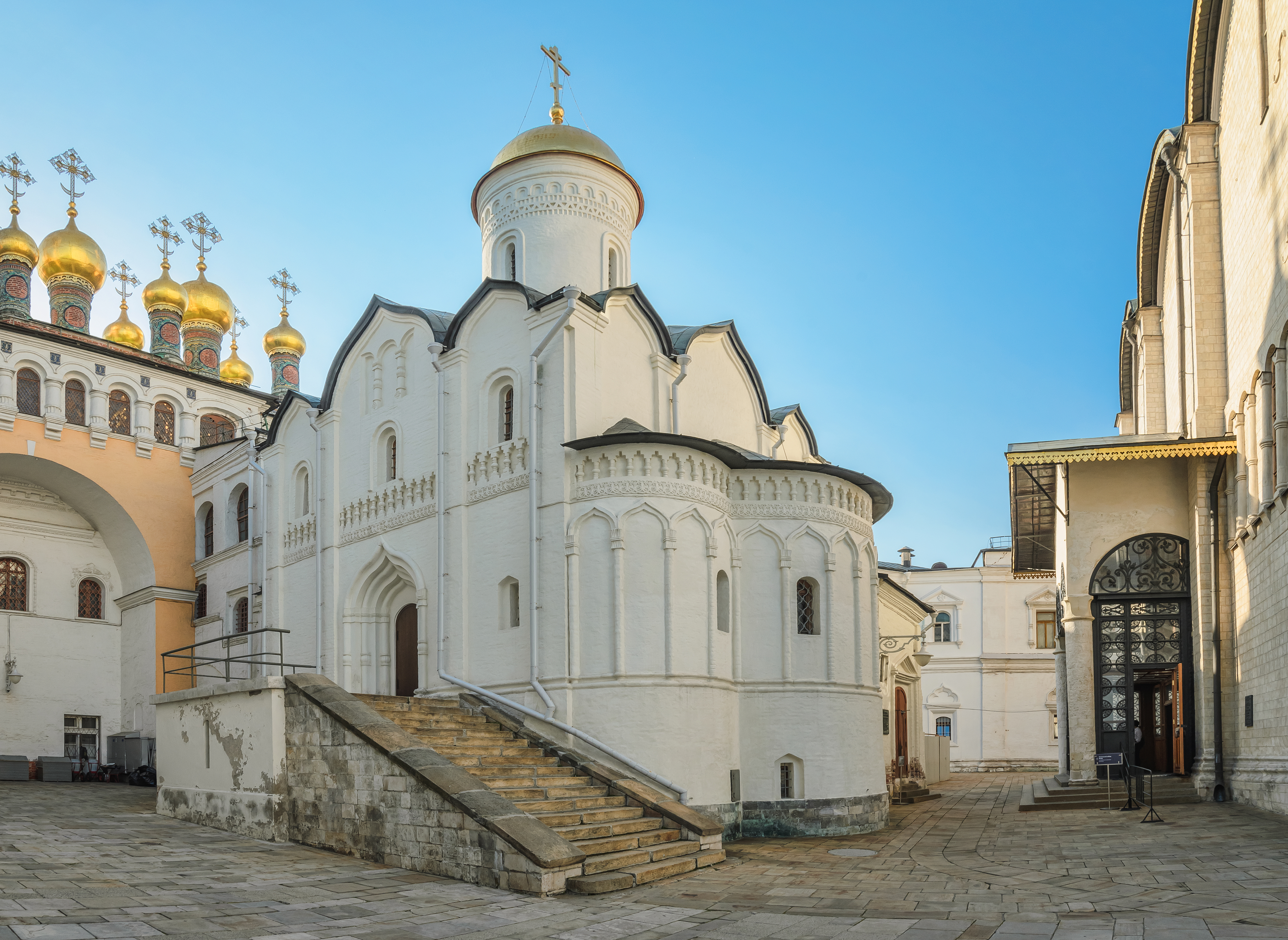
- The Church of the Deposition
- Church of the Deposition of the Robe
- Location: Moscow
- Country: Russia
- Denomination: Russian Orthodox
- Website: www.kreml.ru/en/museums/church_riza/

History
- Dedication: Deposition of the Robe
- Consecrated: 1485

Architecture
- Style: Russian

The Church of the Deposition of the Robe (Russian: Церковь Ризоположения, romanized: Tserkov' Rizopolozhyeniya) is a church which stands on Cathedral Square in the Moscow Kremlin. It was begun in 1484 by masters from Pskov, most likely by the same group of architects who built the adjacent Cathedral of the Annunciation. It serves as a part of Moscow Kremlin Museums.

== History ==
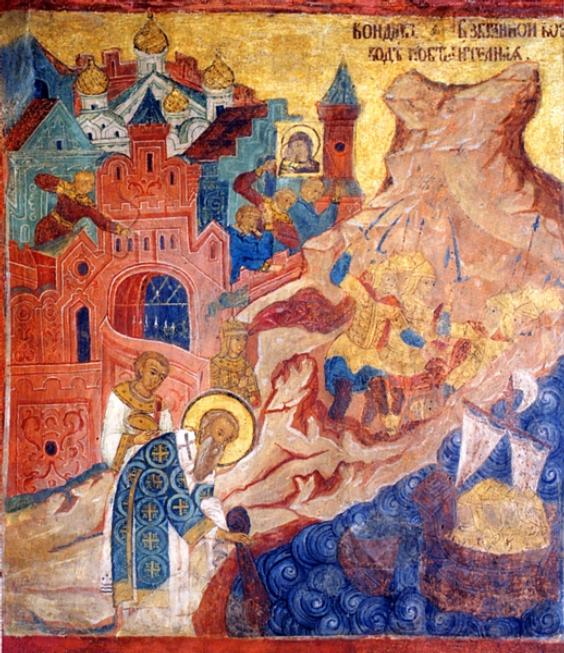
A fresco showing Byzantine emperor Michael III and Patriarch Photios putting the veil of the Theotokos into the sea.

The church was built on the site of a previous church, built by Jonah Metropolitan of Moscow in 1451. The name of the church, variously translated as the Church of the Virgin's Robe, The Church of Laying Our Lady's Holy Robe, The Church of the Veil or simply Church of the Deposition, is said to refer to a festival dating from the 5th century AD, celebrating when the robe of the Virgin Mary was taken from Palestine to Constantinople, where it protected the city from being conquered. For example, tradition says that during the Rus'-Byzantine War of 860 the patriarch placed the Virgin's Robe into the sea, causing a storm that destroyed the invading Rus' ships.

A four-level iconostasis, created by Nazary Istomin Savin in 1627, has been preserved in the church, and has frescoes painted by Ivan Borisov, Sidor Pospeev and Semyon Abramov in 1644. The church itself was built in the traditional Early Russian style, characterized by "a noticeable tendency towards more elevated proportions, the overall structure being extended by being placed on raised foundations, and the drum supporting the single dome also being raised." As with the Cathedral of the Annunciation, the intricate interior detail and ornamentation were characteristic of Russian architecture of this period.

Originally, the church served as the private chapel of the Patriarch of Moscow and all Rus', but during the mid-17th century, it was taken over by the Russian royal family. The church was badly damaged in a fire in 1737 (the same fire that cracked the Tsar Bell).

Today, the church also houses a display of wood sculpture from the 14th to 19th centuries.
