= Kremlin Senate =

Office of the President of Russia

Senate Palace
- Сенатский дворец
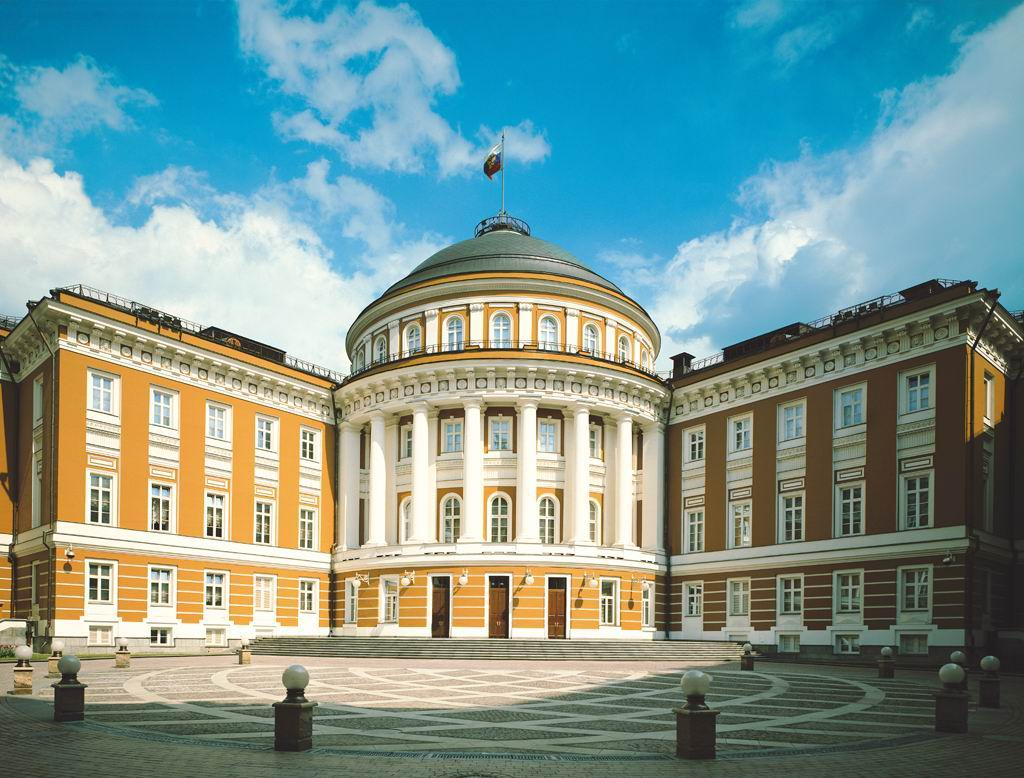

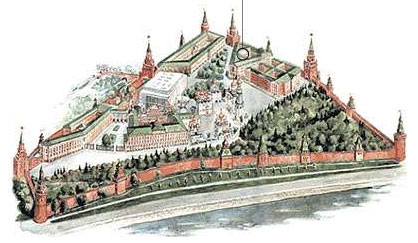
- Location in the Moscow Kremlin

General information
- Architectural style: Neoclassical
- Coordinates: 55°45′12″N 37°37′9″E
- Current tenants: Russian presidential administration
- Construction started: 1776
- Completed: 1788

Design and construction
- Architect: Matvey Kazakov

The Kremlin Senate (The Senate Palace, Russian: Сенатский дворец) is a building within the grounds of the Moscow Kremlin in Russia. Initially constructed from 1776 to 1787, it originally housed the Moscow branch of the Governing Senate, the highest judiciary and legislative office of Imperial Russia. Currently, it houses the Russian presidential administration and is a highly secured and restricted area closed to the public. At present, only the southern corner façade, opposite the Tsar Cannon can be viewed.

== Building ==
The Kremlin Senate is located in the northern part of the Kremlin grounds, between the Kremlin Arsenal and the former, now demolished, Kremlin Presidium (the site of which is planned to be a park). It is shaped like an isosceles triangle with each side approximately 100 metres (330 ft) in length, and with one side directly adjacent to the Kremlin Wall parallel to Red Square. The building has three floors and is painted in the same yellow color as many other administrative buildings within the Moscow Kremlin.

The triangular structure has an inner courtyard, and is divided by hallways into a central pentahedral portion and two side trihedral portions. In the middle of the main façade is an arched passage fashioned like a triumphal arch leading to the inner yard. Inside is Rotunda Hall (diameter 24.6 m or 80 ft 9 in and internal height 27 m or 89 ft), once called The Pantheon of Russia. Its green dome, carrying the state flag as seen from the Red Square, would later become a Soviet propaganda icon. However, originally it carried a statue of St. George, then a statue of Justice (destroyed by French troops in 1812). The exterior styling of the building is an unusual mix of Doric and Ionic order columns.

Inside the building, the large “Catherine Hall” is designed as a parade room, where especially important ceremonies are held. This is a circular hall, with a 24.7-meter diameter under extensive bas-relief ornamentation depicting Catherine as the Greek goddess Minerva.

=== Interiors ===
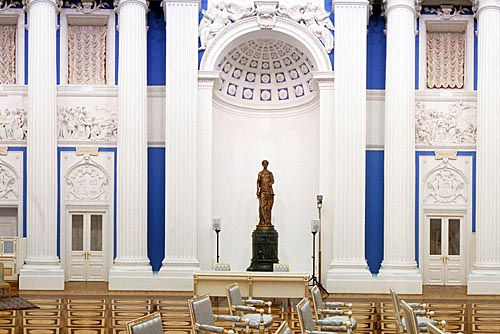
The Catherine Hall

The Presidential Residence consists of two parts: the business part and the representative part. The business part includes the working and representative rooms, the Presidential Council Hall, the Library and the Security Council premises. The representative part consists of a grand enfilade of rooms where international meetings and protocol events are held. All the rooms are located along the outer facades and are connected through corridors running along the perimeter of the inner courtyards.

The president's executive office, decorated in white and green colours, is located in the Oval Room. Meetings and negotiations are held there and state awards are presented. The room is decorated with a malachite fireplace, a mirror with a bronze clock and candelabrums on the mantelpiece, and four tall sculptures: Peter the Great, Catherine the Great, Nicholas I and Alexander II. The hall's crystal chandeliers are based on drawings by Kazakov.

In the recess of the courtyard is the main compositional centre of the building – the Catherine Hall. It is one of the largest circular halls in Moscow: it is 25 metres in diameter and 27 metres high. Formerly it had been intended for assemblies of the nobility for elections to the local government. Its decoration consists of 24 columns of Corinthian white marble and bas-reliefs in antique style. The partitions between the windows in the domed section are filled with plaster medallions with bas-relief images of Russian dukes and tsars. In the piers between the columns are eighteen high relief panels on allegorical subjects composed by Gavrila Derzhavin and Nikolay Lvov. They reflect the state activities of Catherine II and glorify legality, justice and enlightenment. The vault of the dome is decorated with caissons, giving it depth.

The president's office is in classicist style, with a circular rotunda adorned with a bronze chandelier. Next to it is the Blue Drawing Room with white and gold furniture. The Audience Hall, in light colours with gilding, is decorated with portraits of Russian emperors, marble and a classical fireplace. The Banqueting Room in light yellow and blue tones completes the enfilade of representation rooms. The furniture in it was created according to the surviving drawings of the 18th century.

The Fireside Hall and Drawing Room are used for meetings and the signing of state documents. The Dining Room is used for informal breakfasts and lunches and working meetings of the Russian president with the leaders of various states. On the third floor of the northeast part of the building is the Presidential Library. The bookcases contain encyclopaedias, reference books and legislation. This room contains an authentic copy of the Constitution of the Russian Federation, on which the presidents take the oath of office.

== History ==
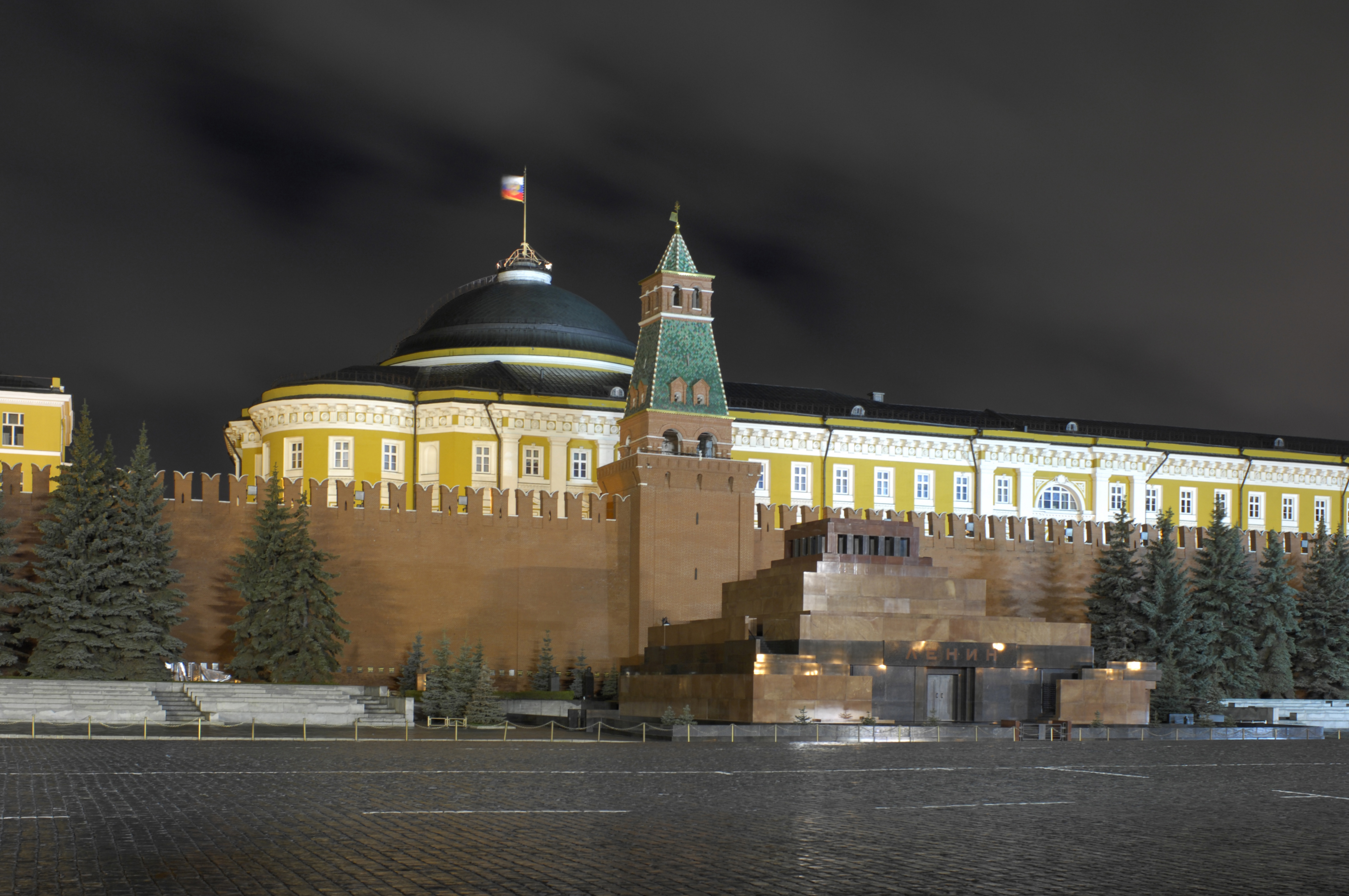
Kremlin Senate (top floor, roof, and flag) at night seen from Red Square.

The Kremlin Senate in 1967.

The Governing Senate was an institution created by Tsar Peter the Great in 1711. It had six departments, four of which were in St Petersburg and two of which were in Moscow. Empress Catherine the Great had been a frequent guest in Moscow at the time when the city, neglected by past monarchs, did not have enough state offices. She ordered the construction of a building to house the Moscow branches of the Governing Senate, namely the national judiciary administration and the seat of elected administration for the Moscow region. The new building was designed by Matvey Kazakov who had participated in the design of the Moscow Arsenal, and construction was started in 1776 by Karl Blank on a large triangular property in the north-east of the Moscow Kremlin, following a 1775 draft by Kazakov. The site once housed the Trubetskoy family palace and at least three churches. In 1779 Blank was demoted, and Kazakov took the lead. He envisaged Governing Senate as a “Temple of Law”, and designed the structure in a Neoclassical style characterized by symmetry and rigour. The building was completed in 1787, with interior work continuing to 1790.

Kazakov's building cost 759,000 roubles. According to Ivan Kondratiev, Catherine was so impressed by the building that she gave Kazakov her gloves, saying "I'll pay your bills later, for now – this is a token for your wife". She indeed repaid Kazakov with diamonds, promotion and a pension. The building later served as a model for several other official buildings in other Russian cities in the late 18th and 19th centuries.

Later, in line with legal reforms of Catherine's successors, the building lost its national functions and became the seat of Moscow Regional Court (Здание Московских судебных установлений) and several other state offices.

=== Post-1900 ===
In 1905, Grand Duke Sergei Alexandrovich Romanov, the military governor of Moscow, was assassinated just outside the Moscow Senate by Ivan Kalyayev. This was commemorated by a memorial cross, designed by Victor Vasnetsov in 1908. In 1918, the monument was destroyed by the Bolshevik administration.

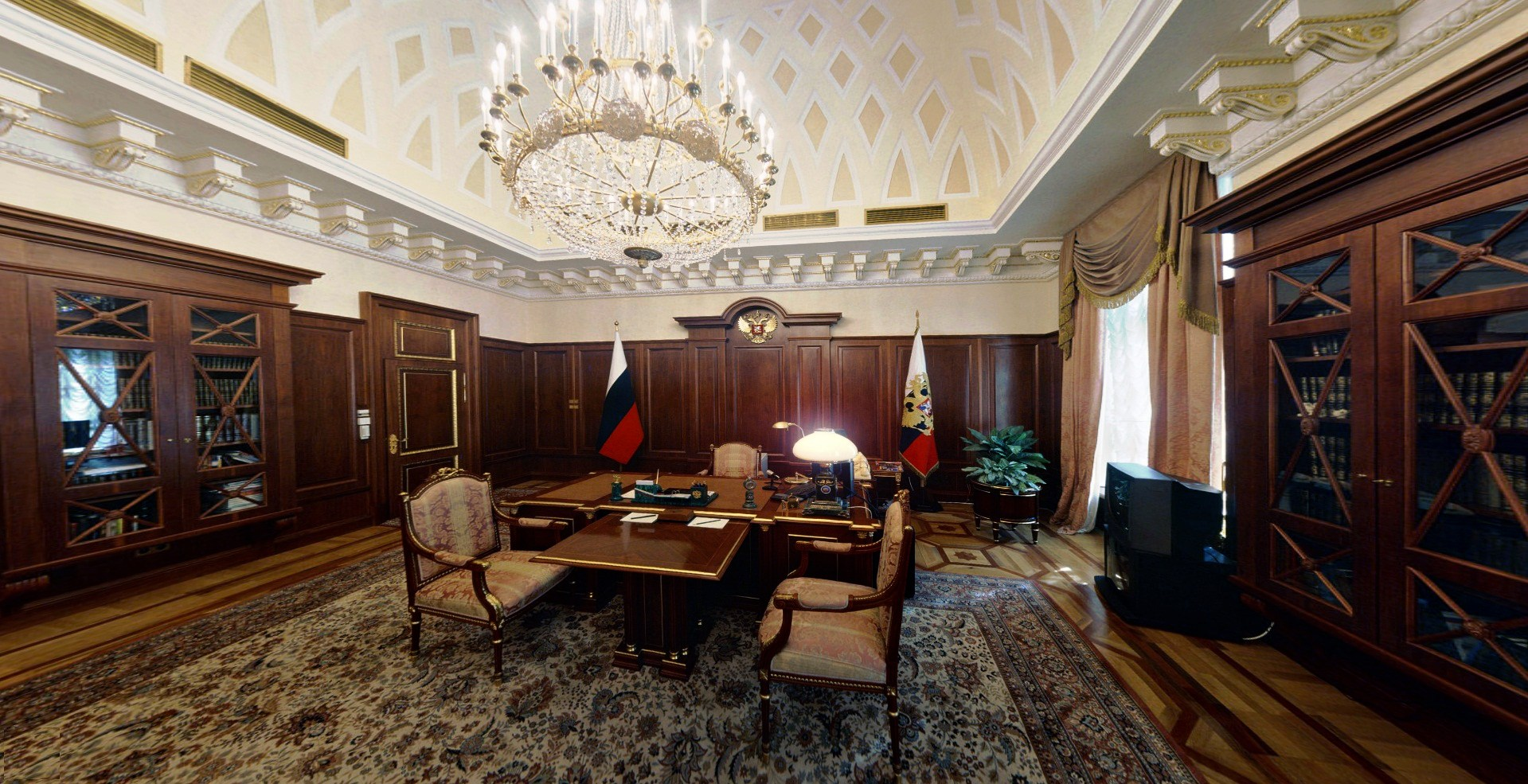
Working office of the President of Russia in the Senate Palace

After the 1917 Russian Revolution and relocation of the capital to Moscow, the Kremlin Senate served as the seat of the Soviet government, including the Politburo. Vladimir Lenin had his study and private apartment on the third floor in 1918–1922. Later, the Senate housed Joseph Stalin's study and conference hall. Stalin maintained a small service apartment within the Kremlin Senate, although he chose not to live within the Senate building as his main residence. In 1955, Lenin's apartments were opened to public access; however, in 1994, all exhibits of this museum were relocated to Gorki Leninskiye and the Senate closed its doors to the public again. From 1946 through the dissolution of the Soviet Union in 1991, the Council of People's Commissars, later known as the Council of Ministers and as the Cabinet of Ministers, was based in this building.

In 1994–1998, Senate building was converted to house the Russian presidential administration. An indiscriminate reconstruction from scratch destroyed Kazakov's interiors. Preservation advocate Alexei Komech reported from the site: "... crushed walls, ripped air ducts and piles of 200 year old bricks remind me of wandering around ruins of Berlin's Reich Chancellery in 1946". Other sources, however, maintain that the reconstruction actually restored the interiors to the original Kazakov's plans after two centuries of ad-hoc modifications. Present-day photographs also show that the builders destroyed and paved the chestnut garden that used to grace the Senate's courtyard in the 1970s.

On the night of May 2–3, 2023, the building was hit by an alleged drone attack, which detonated on top of its roof.
