= Yevgeni Goryachev =

Russian footballer

Personal information
- Full name: Yevgeni Dmitriyevich Goryachev
- Date of birth: 16 January 1992 (age 34)
- Place of birth: Bryansk, Russia
- Height: 1.84 m (6 ft 0 in)
- Positions: Midfielder; defender

Youth career
- –2008: FC Spartak Moscow
- 2009–2010: Trudovyye Rezervy-Sportakademklub Moscow

Senior career*
Years	Team	Apps	(Gls)
2011–2012	FC Tom Tomsk	0	(0)
2012	FC Dolgoprudny	0	(0)
2012–2013	FC Gornyak Uchaly	16	(0)
2013	FC Sibir-2 Novosibirsk	11	(0)
2014–2015	FC Podolye Podolsky district	20	(1)
2015	FC Nosta Novotroitsk	2	(0)
2016	FC MITOS Novocherkassk	9	(1)
2016–2018	FC Khimki	10	(0)
2018	FC Khimki-M	8	(1)
2019	FC Prialit Reutov		
- * Club domestic league appearances and goals

Yevgeni Dmitriyevich Goryachev (Russian: Евгений Дмитриевич Горячев; born 16 January 1992) is a Russian former football player.

== Club career ==
He made his debut in the Russian Second Division for FC Gornyak Uchaly on 5 September 2012 in a game against FC Lada-Togliatti Togliatti.

He made his Russian Football National League debut for FC Khimki on 8 April 2017 in a game against FC Yenisey Krasnoyarsk.
