= Yelena Gagarina =

Russian art historian

- Елена Гагарина
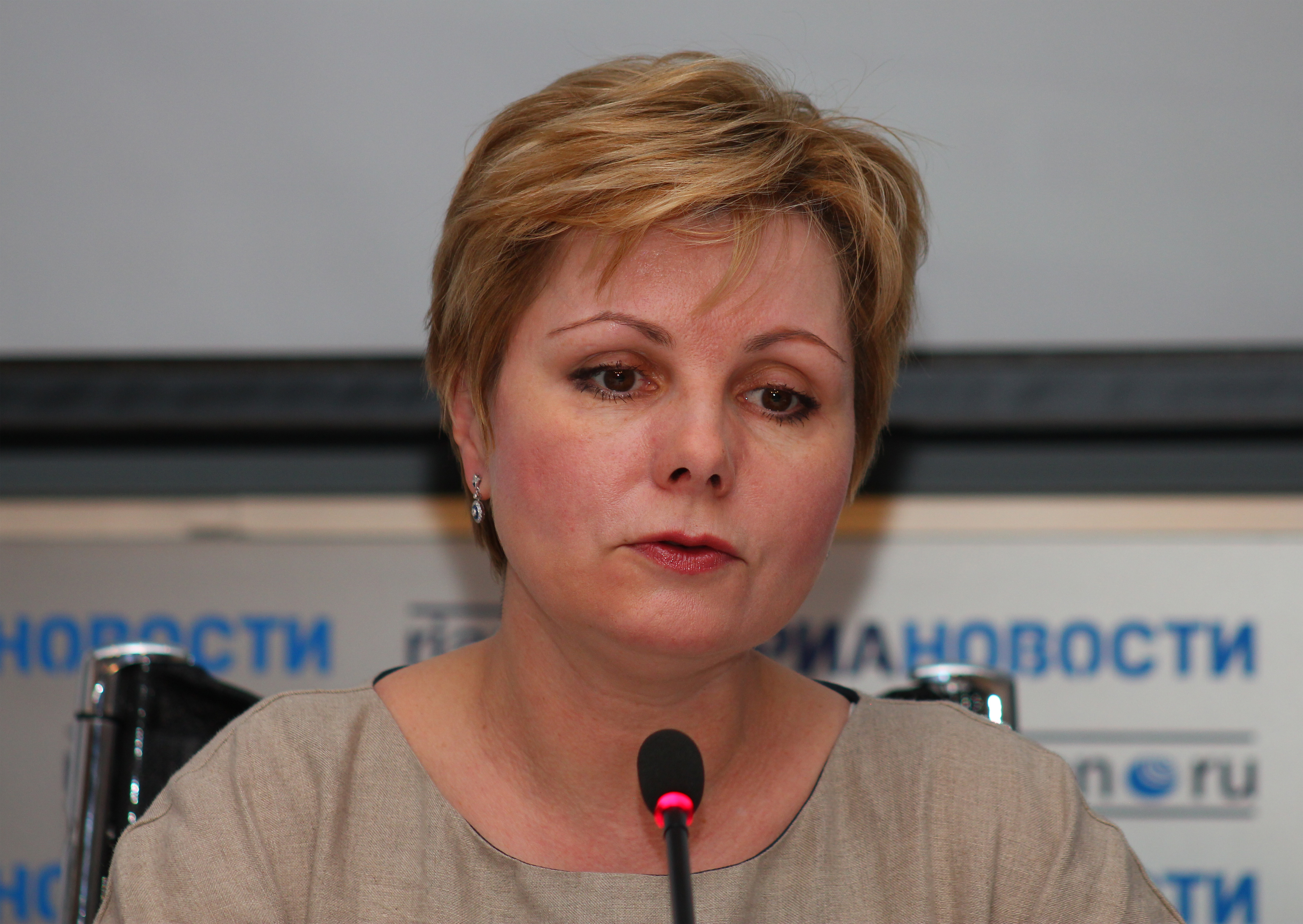
- Gagarina in 2014
- Born: April 17, 1959 (age 67); Zapolyarny, Murmansk Oblast, Russian SFSR, Soviet Union
- Occupation: Art historian
- Parent(s): Yuri Gagarin (father); Valentina Ivanovna Gagarina (mother)

Yelena Yurievna Gagarina (Russian: Еле́на Ю́рьевна Гага́рина; born 17 April 1959) is a Russian art historian. She has been the general director of Moscow Kremlin Museums since 2001. She is also the elder daughter of Yuri Gagarin.

== Career ==
Gagarina graduated from MSU Faculty of History; her specialty is the history of art. She has been a member of the Commission of the Russian Federation for UNESCO since 16 March 2005.

In 2014, she signed a collective appeal of cultural figures of the Russian Federation in support of the policy of President Vladimir Putin in Ukraine and Crimea.

== Personal life ==
Gagarina is the daughter of the Soviet cosmonaut Yuri Gagarin and Valentina Ivanovna Gagarina. She grew up in the space training facility known as Star City, in Zvyozdny gorodok.
