= Terem Palace =

Building in the Moscow Kremlin, Russia

Coordinates: 55°45′02″N 37°36′56″E

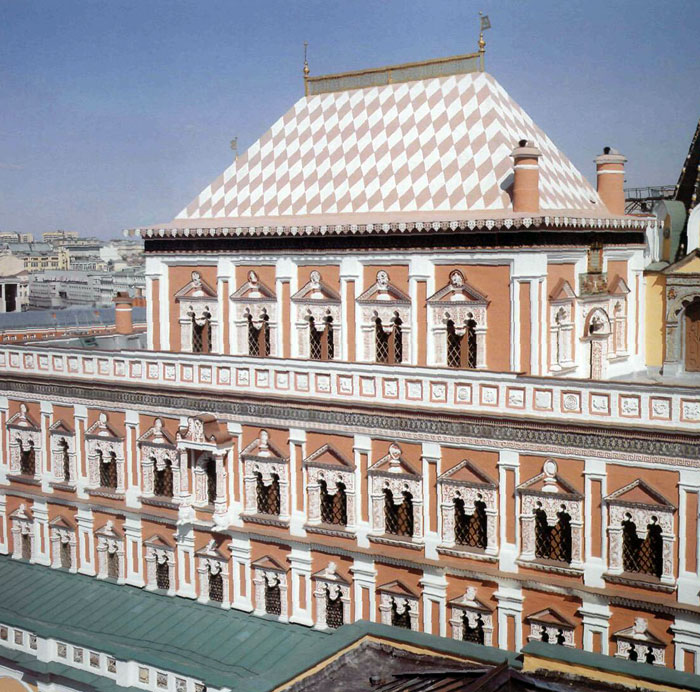
Façade of the Terem Palace.

Terem Palace or Teremnoy Palace (Russian: Теремной дворец) is a historical building in the Moscow Kremlin, Russia, which used to be the main residence of the Russian czars in the 17th century. Its name is derived from the Greek word τέρεμνον (i.e., "dwelling"). Currently, the structure is not accessible to the public, as it belongs to the official residence of the President of Russia.

In the 16th century, Aloisio da Milano constructed the first royal palace on the spot. Only the ground floor from that structure survives, as the first Romanov tsar, Mikhail Feodorovich, had the palace completely rebuilt in 1635–1636. The new structure was surrounded by numerous annexes and outbuildings, including the Boyar Platform, Golden Staircase, Golden Porch, and several turrets. On Mikhail's behest, the adjoining Golden Tsaritsa's Chamber constructed back in the 1560s for Ivan IV's wife, was surmounted with 11 golden domes of the Upper Saviour Cathedral. The complex of the palace also incorporates several churches of earlier construction, including the Church of the Virgin's Nativity from the 1360s.

The palace consists of five stories. The third story was occupied by the czarina and her children; the fourth one contained the private apartments of the czar. The upper story is a tent-like structure where the Boyar Duma convened. The exterior, exuberantly decorated with brick tracery and colored tiles, is brilliantly painted in red, yellow, and orange. The interior used to be painted as well, but the original murals were destroyed by successive fires, particularly the great fire of 1812. In 1837, the interiors were renovated in accordance with old drawings in the Russian Revival style.

== Gallery ==
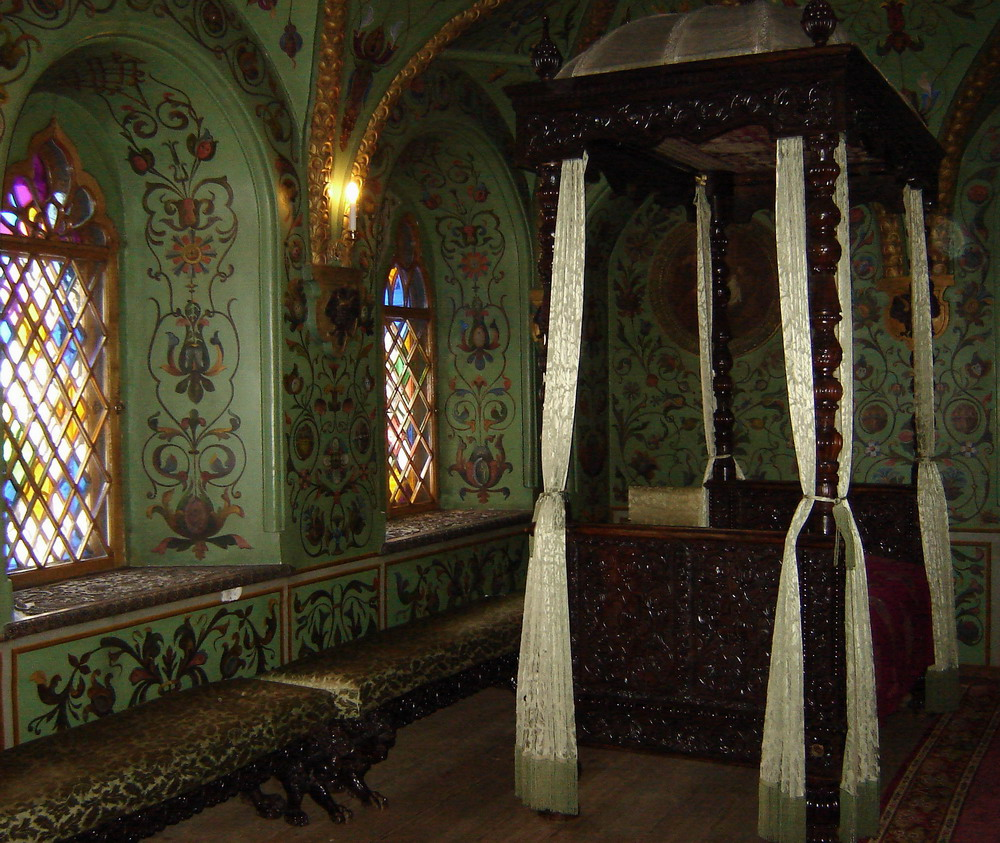

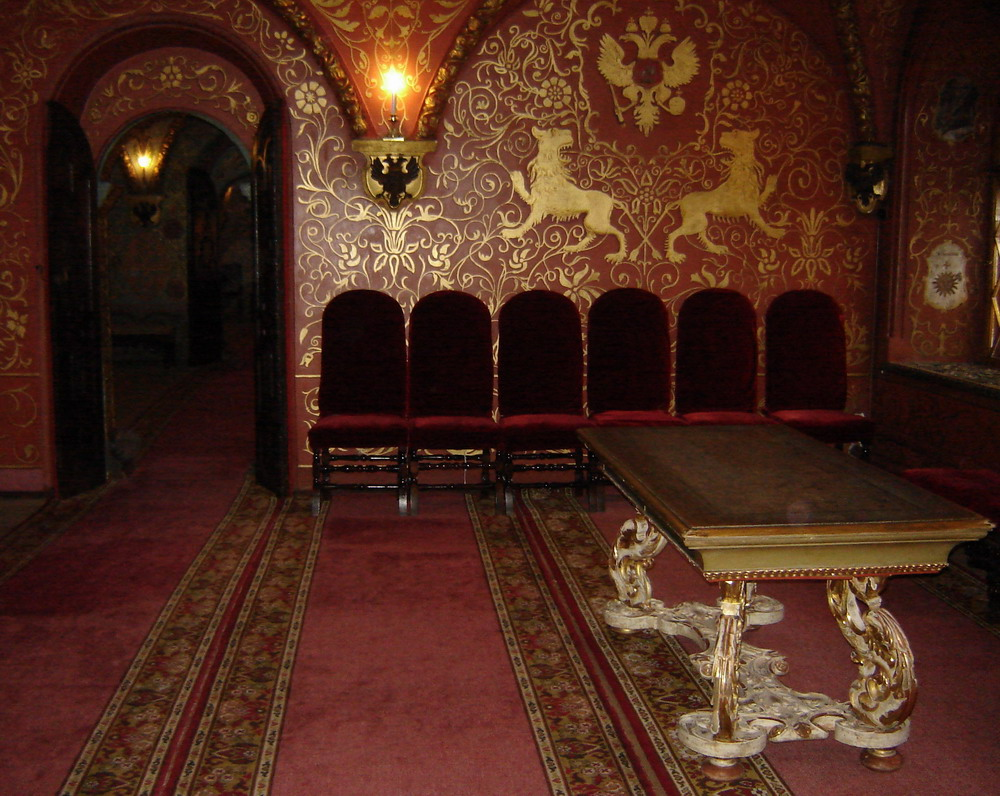

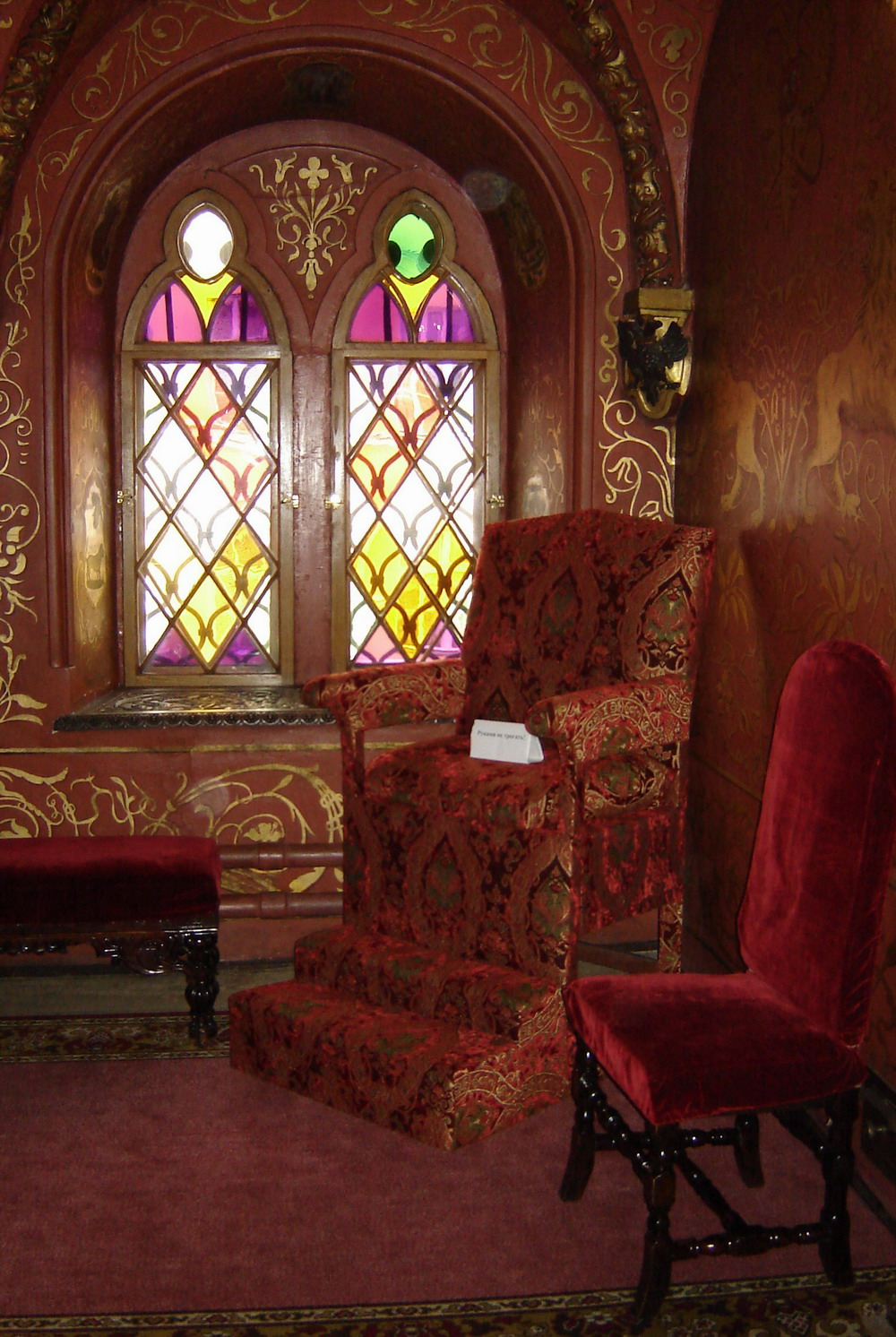

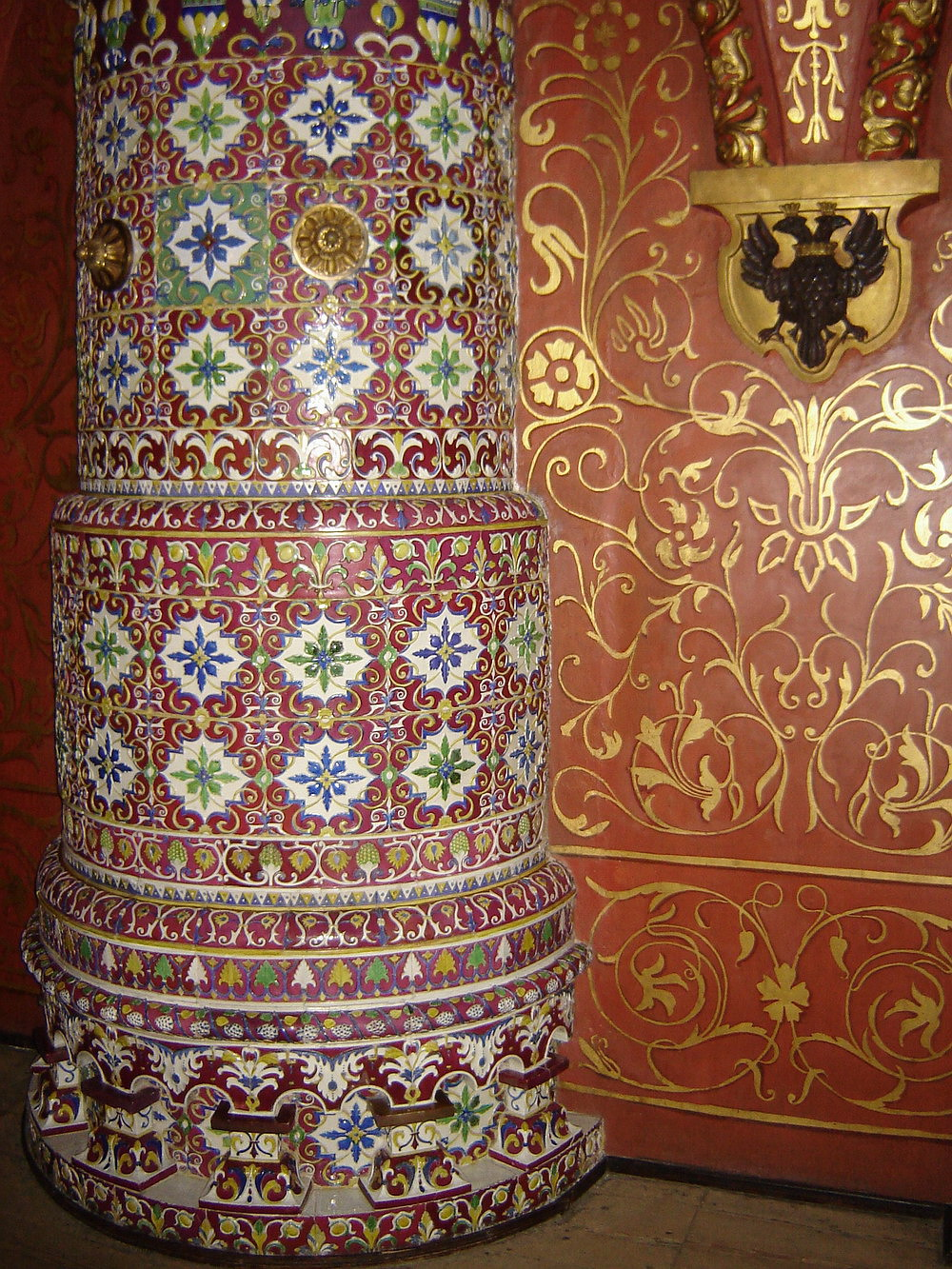

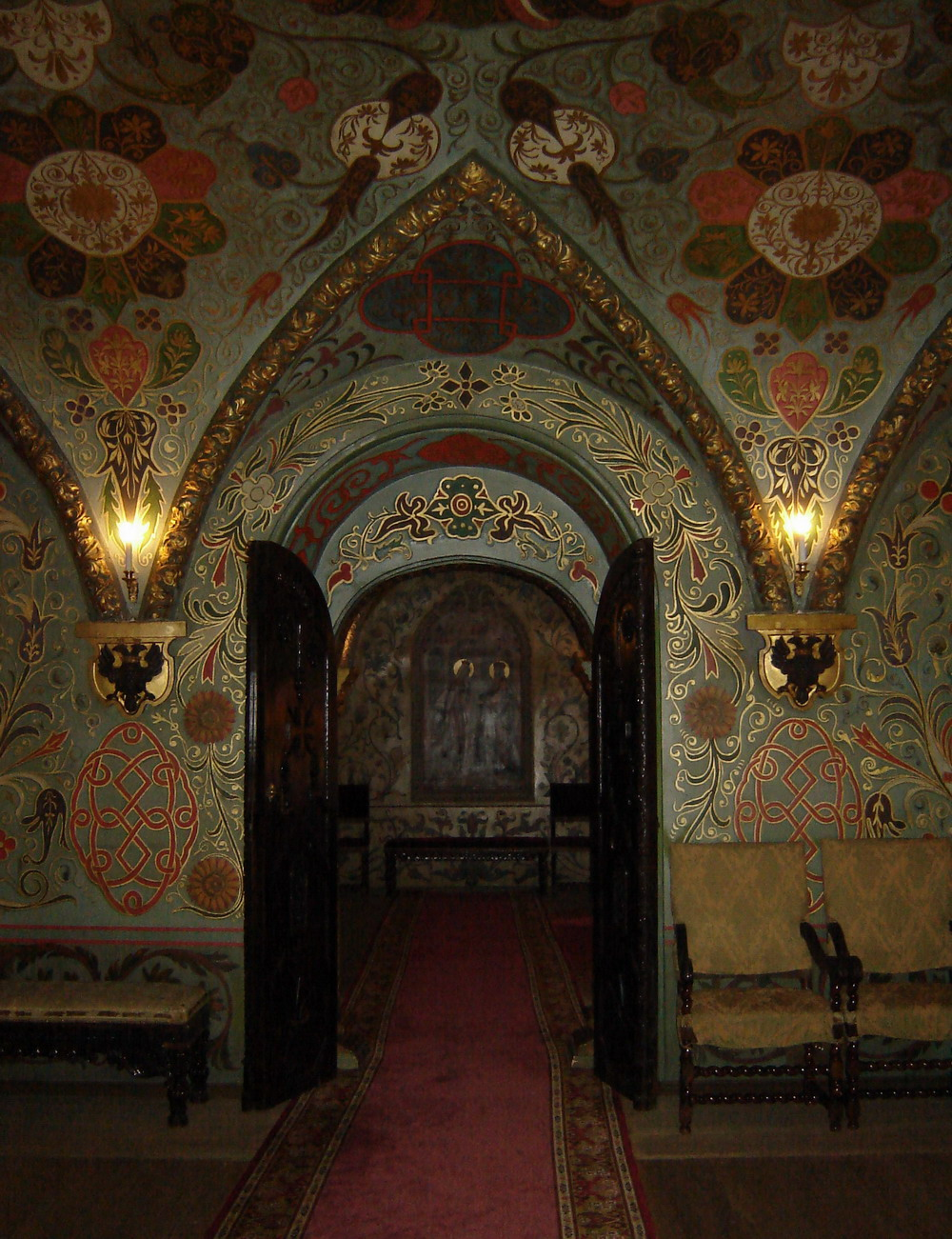

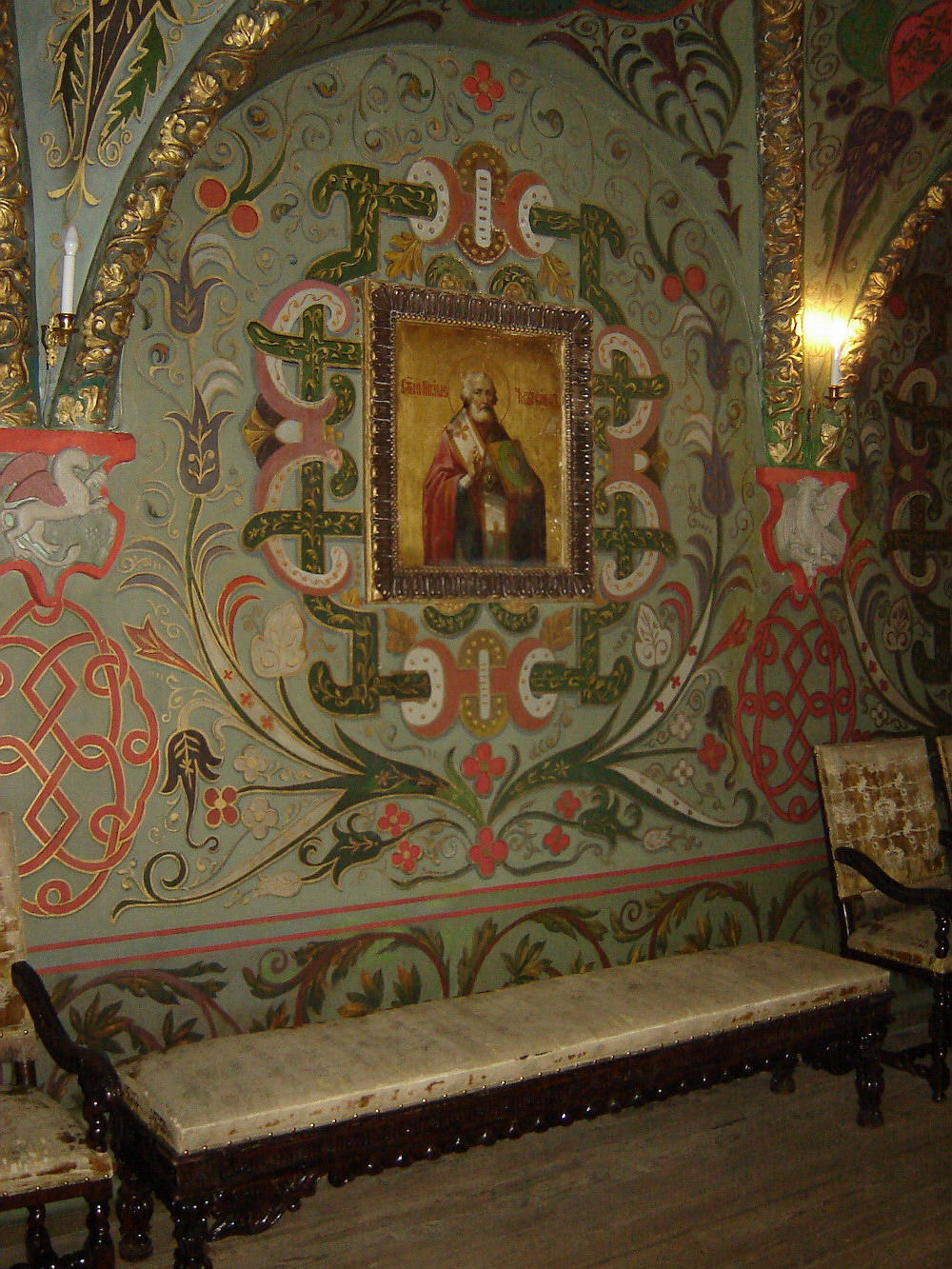

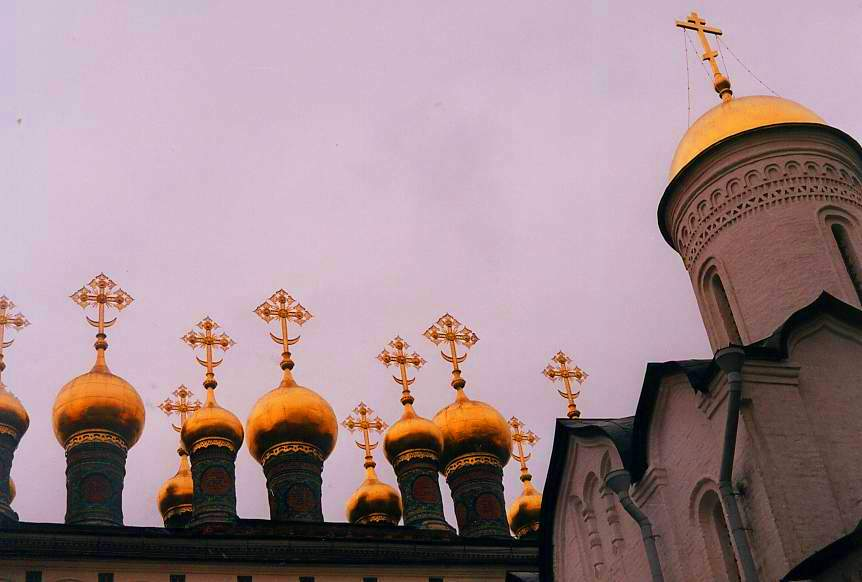
Turrets
