= Kremlin Arsenal =

Military Installation in Moscow, Russia

- Арсенал Московского Кремля
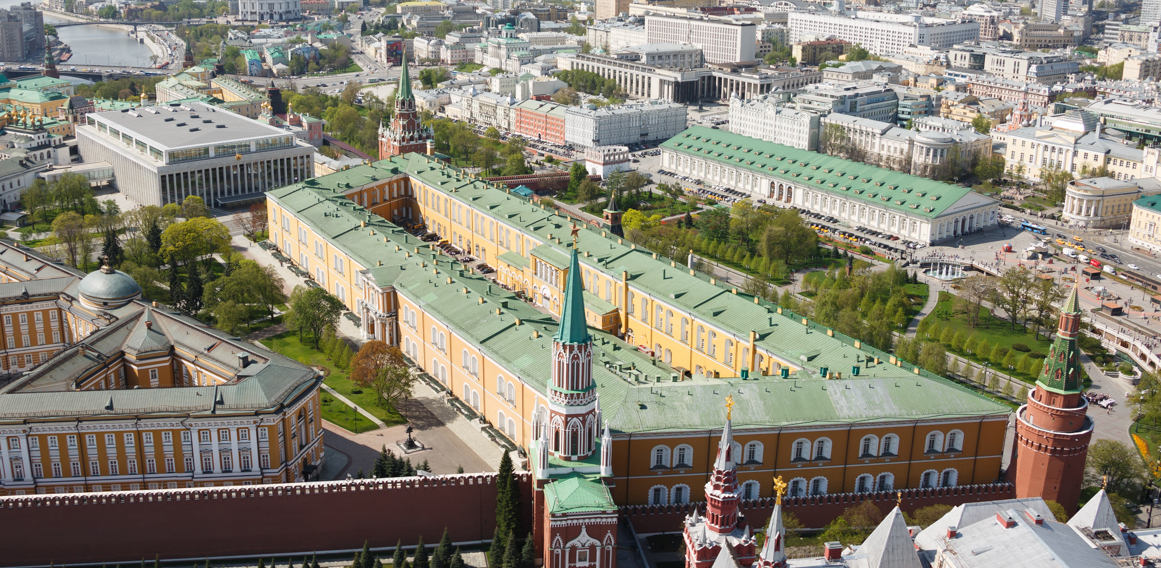

General information
- Architectural style: Neoclassical
- Coordinates: 55°45′13″N 37°36′59″E
- Current tenants: Kremlin Regiment
- Construction started: 1702
- Completed: 1828

The Kremlin Arsenal (Russian: Арсенал Московского Кремля) is a former armory built within the grounds of the Moscow Kremlin in Russia. Initially constructed in 1736, it has been rebuilt several times. It remains in military use to date, unlike the Kremlin Armoury, another arsenal within the walls of the Moscow Kremlin, which is now a museum. The building is off-limits to tourists.

== Building ==
The Kremlin Arsenal is a large elongated trapezoid two-storey building with a large courtyard. It occupies most of the northern corner of the Moscow Kremlin.

== History ==
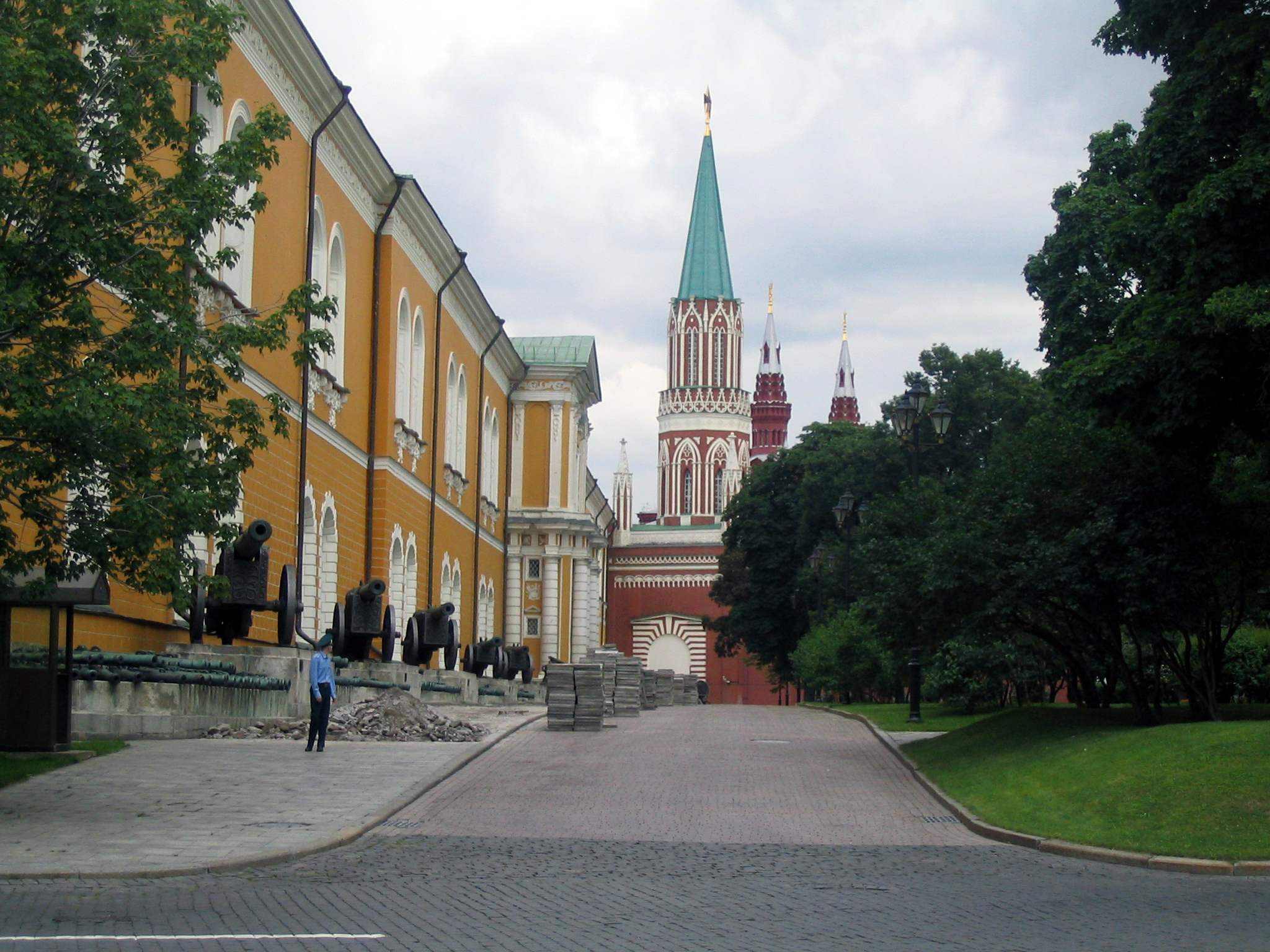
Cannons and mortars of La Grande Armée are exhibited along the yellow Arsenal building

In the Middle Ages, the spot was occupied by granaries. After they burnt down in the last years of the 17th century, Peter the Great engaged a team of Russian and German architects to construct the Kremlin Arsenal, designed to be one of the largest buildings in Moscow at the time. Construction started in 1702, but was interrupted due to lack of funds during the Great Northern War with Sweden, and was only completed in 1736, under supervision of Field-Marshal Burkhard Christoph von Münnich. The new building was gutted by a fire in 1737, and only restored from 1786-1796.

During Napoleon's invasion of Russia, the retreating French soldiers had the central part of the building blown up. It was restored between 1816 and 1828 to a Neoclassical design in order to house a museum dedicated to the Russian victory over Napoleon.
