= Anvar =

Anvar is a masculine given name and surname of Arabic origin. The name means "light" in Arabic. Notable people with the name include:

== Given name ==
- Anvar Afandiyev (born 1964), Azerbaijani Army officer
- Anvar Allakhiarov (born 2000), Russian Greco-Roman wrestler
- Anvar Anvarov (born 2000), Uzbek long jumper
- Anvar Arazov (1953–1992), Azerbaijani war hero
- Anvar Artykov (born 1951), Kyrgyz politician
- Anvar Azimov (born 1950), Russian politician and diplomat
- Anvar Berdiev (born 1978), Uzbek footballer
- Anvar Bikzhanov (born 1951), Russian football coach
- Anvar Boynazarov (born 1989), Uzbek Muay Thai kickboxer and mixed martial artist
- Anvar Chingizoglu (born 1962), Azerbaijani historian, ethnologist, and genealogist
- Anvar Gafurov (born 1982), Uzbek footballer
- Anvar Gasimzade (1912–1969), Azerbaijani architect
- Anvar Gazimagomedov (born 1988), Russian footballer
- Anvar Ibragimgadzhiyev (born 1991), Russian footballer
- Anvar Ibragimov (1965–2023), Russian fencer
- Anvar Juraboev (1948–2010), Uzbek journalist, historian, and politician
- Anvar Khamei (1917–2018), Iranian sociologist, economist, journalist, and politician
- Anvar Khojimirzaev (born 1994), Uzbek footballer
- Anvar Kuchmuradov (born 1970), Uzbek sprinter
- Anvar Kurbanov (born 1948), Uzbek builder and craftsman
- Anvar Mammadkhanli (1913–1990), Azerbaijani writer, screenwriter, script writer, translator, and art worker
- Anvar Norkulov (born 1975), Tajik footballer
- Anvar Rajabov (born 1988), Uzbek footballer
- Anvar Saidenov (born 1960), Kazakh financier, banker, and politician
- Anvarjon Soliev (born 1978), Uzbek football player and coach
- Anvar-qori Tursunov, Uzbek imam
- Anvar Yunusov (born 1987), Tajik boxer
- Anvar Zakhidov (born 1953), Uzbek-American physicist

== Surname ==
- Cas Anvar (born 1966), Canadian actor, voice actor, and writer
- Hassan Anvar (born 1974), Chinese-Uyghur Guantanamo detainee
- Qasim-i Anvar (1356–1433), Persian Sufi mystic, poet, and preacher of the Safavid order

== See also ==
- Khvajeh Anvar, a village in Donbaleh Rud-e Shomali Rural District, Dehdez District, Izeh County, Khuzestan Province, Iran
- Ənvər Məmmədxanlı, Azerbaijan, a village and municipality in the Ujar Rayon of Azerbaijan
- Andvar, a village in Chelav Rural District, in the Central District of Amol County, Mazandaran Province, Iran
- Anvard, the moatless castle where King Lune of Archenland resides in the fictional land of Narnia
- Anvari (1126–1189), Persian poet
- Anvari (surname)
- Avar (disambiguation)
- Anwar (disambiguation)
