= Anwara =

Anwara may refer to:

== People ==
- Anwara Bahar Chowdhury (1919–1987), Bangladeshi social activist and writer
- Anwara Begum (born 1948), Bangladeshi actress
- Anwara Begum (academic), Bangladeshi academic
- Anwara Syed Haq (born 1949), Bangladeshi writer
- Anwara Taimur (born 1936), Indian politician

== Other uses ==
- Anwara (film), a 1967 Bangladeshi film
- Anwara Upazila, an administrative unit in Chittagong District, Bangladesh

== See also ==
- Anwar (disambiguation)
