= Zarema Nagayeva =

Uzbek architect (1949)

Zarema Nagayeva Shevchenko National Prize laureate
- Born: Zarema Sodiqovna Nagayeva; 30 August 1949; Tashkent, UzbSSR, USSR
- Occupation: Architect
- Buildings: Administrative and public center in Khiva; Musical drama theaters in the cities of Urganch and Ko'kan; Ministry of Foreign Affairs of Uzbekistan; Tashkent health care complex
- Projects: Kamenka and Beloye micro districts of Simferopol city; Ismail-Bey micro-district in the city of Yevpatoria; Simferopol cathedral mosque complex project; A monument to the victims of deportation in Simferopol

Zarema Sodiqovna Nagayeva (Ukrainian: Зарема Садиківна Нагаєва; born August 30, 1949, in Tashkent) is a Soviet, Uzbek, Ukrainian, and Russian architect. She holds a doctorate in architecture and is a professor. She has been a member of the Russian Union of Architects since 1977.

== Early life ==
She was born in Tashkent on August 30, 1949. She spent her childhood in the Uzbek SSR. Her father was an architect, Sodiq Nagayev. She completed her studies at the Faculty of Architecture of Tashkent Polytechnic Institute in 1972. In 1988, she defended her candidate's dissertation on the topic "Functional and Planning Organization of Services to the Population in Central Cities and Districts (on the Example of Uzbekistan's Cities)" and in 1998, she defended her doctoral dissertation on the topic "Urban Planning Organization in Providing Public Services to the Population of Uzbekistan".

From 1970 to 1990, she worked at the Institute of Urban Planning Research in Uzbekistan. Simultaneously, she worked at Tashkent Polytechnic Institute from 1972 to 1983 and from 1988 to 1991. Until 1999, she taught at the Tashkent Institute of Architecture and Construction.

From 2000 to 2001, she was an associate professor at the Department of Primary Pedagogy and Teaching Methodology at the Crimean Engineering and Pedagogical University. From 2001 to 2006, she was the head and director of the Department of Fine and Decorative Applied Art. From 2004 to 2006, she served as the director of the Crimean division of the National Academy of Fine Arts and Architecture of Ukraine. From 2006 to 2008, she worked as a social and political consultant for the Crimean Republic organization of the Socialist Party of Ukraine.

From 2008 to 2014, she served as the head of the Department of "Architecture Project (Urban Planning)" at the National Academy of Environmental Engineering and Resort Development. She became a professor in the department in 2011. From 2015, she worked as the head of the Department of Urban Planning at the Construction and Architecture Academy of Vernadsky University, located in Simferopol, Crimea.

== Scientific and creative activity ==
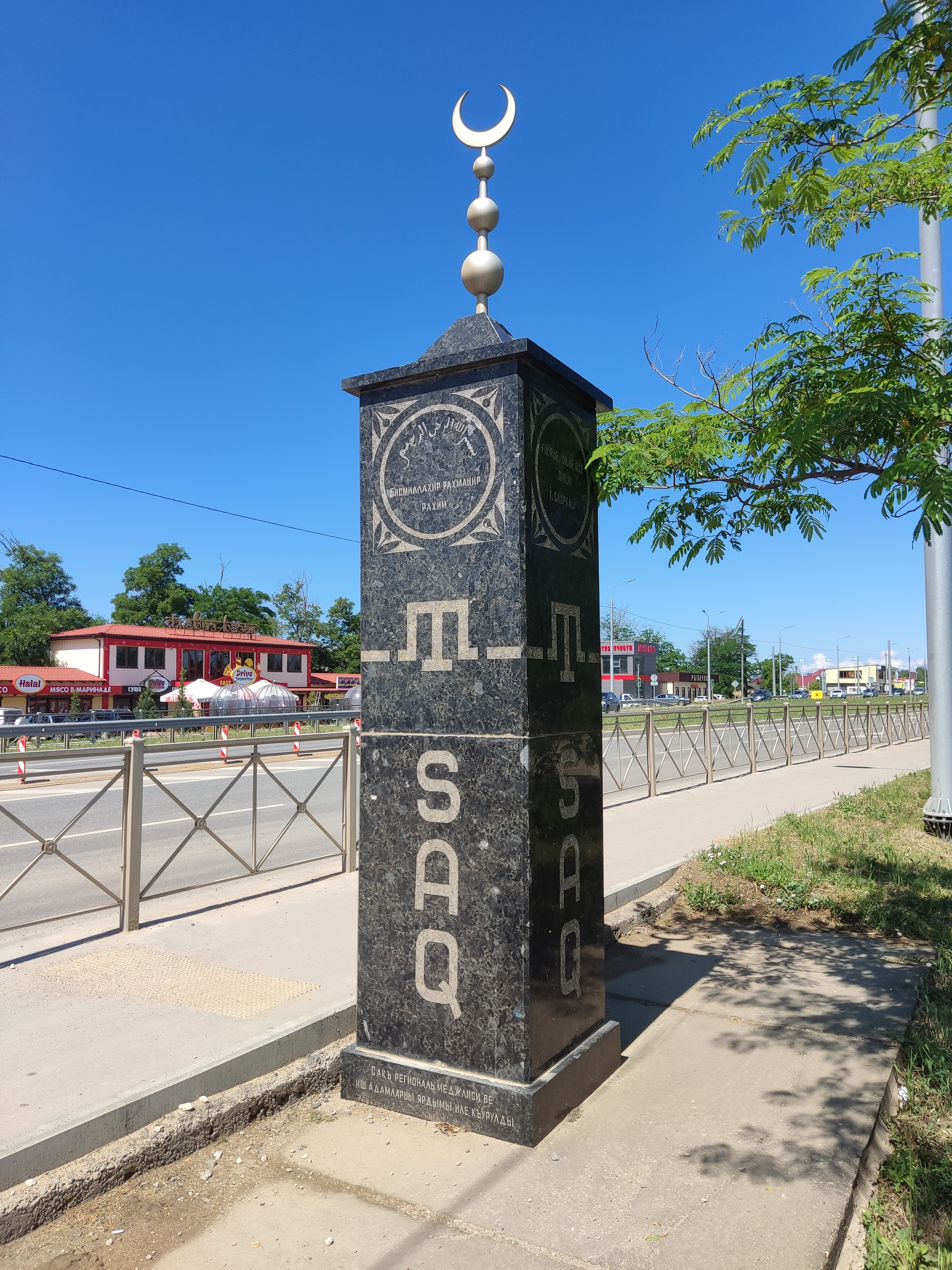
Monument in Saki by Nagaeva

Scientific research relates to the optimization of urban environments in the natural-climatic conditions of Crimea, the creation of cultural and ethnographic centers in the context of ethnographic tourism, the formation and development of folk craft centers in the Republic of Crimea, issues related to the development of architectural and artistic education in Ukraine, the study of the creative legacy of ancient architects, and the identification of architectural monuments in the Republic of Crimea. Author of the article "Crimean Tatar Architecture" in the Encyclopedia of Contemporary Ukraine. During her work in Uzbekistan, she designed the administrative and public center in Khiva, music and drama theaters in Urgench and Kokand, vacation homes for the diplomatic service (Tashkent region), and the medical and health complex of the Ministry of Foreign Affairs of Uzbekistan (Tashkent).

Since 1991, she has been involved in designing projects in Crimea. Her projects include the general plan of the Kameko and Beloye micro-districts in Simferopol, the outline design of the cultural and ethnographic center, and the general plan of the Ismail-Bey micro-district in Yevpatoria, the facades and interiors of the Crimean Tatar Academic Music and Drama Theater, the "Renaissance" complex at the Crimean Engineering and Pedagogical University (in collaboration), the outline design of the Simferopol Cathedral Mosque complex (2011; in collaboration), and the monument to the victims of deportation in Simferopol (2013). In 2009, in collaboration with her brother I.-G. Nagayev and A. Bekirov won the competition for the development of an outline design of the memorial complex dedicated to pilot Amet-Khan Sultan in Simferopol (not implemented).

== Awards ==
- National Prize of Ukraine named after Taras Shevchenko (2005; jointly with I.-G. S. Nagayev, A. E. Aliyev, A. R. Abdullaev, F. Y. Yakubov) — for the sculptural complex "Revival" in Simferopol.
- Certificate from the Presidium of the State Council of the Republic of Crimea (2016).
- Merited Architect of the Republic of Crimea (2018).

== See also ==
- Sobir Odilov
- Sergo Sutyagin
- Anvar Kurbanov
