= Ioanno-Predtechensky Monastery =

Orthodox concent in Vyazma, Smolensk Oblast, Russia

The Ioanno-Predtechensky Monastery
- Иоанно-Предтеченский Монастырь
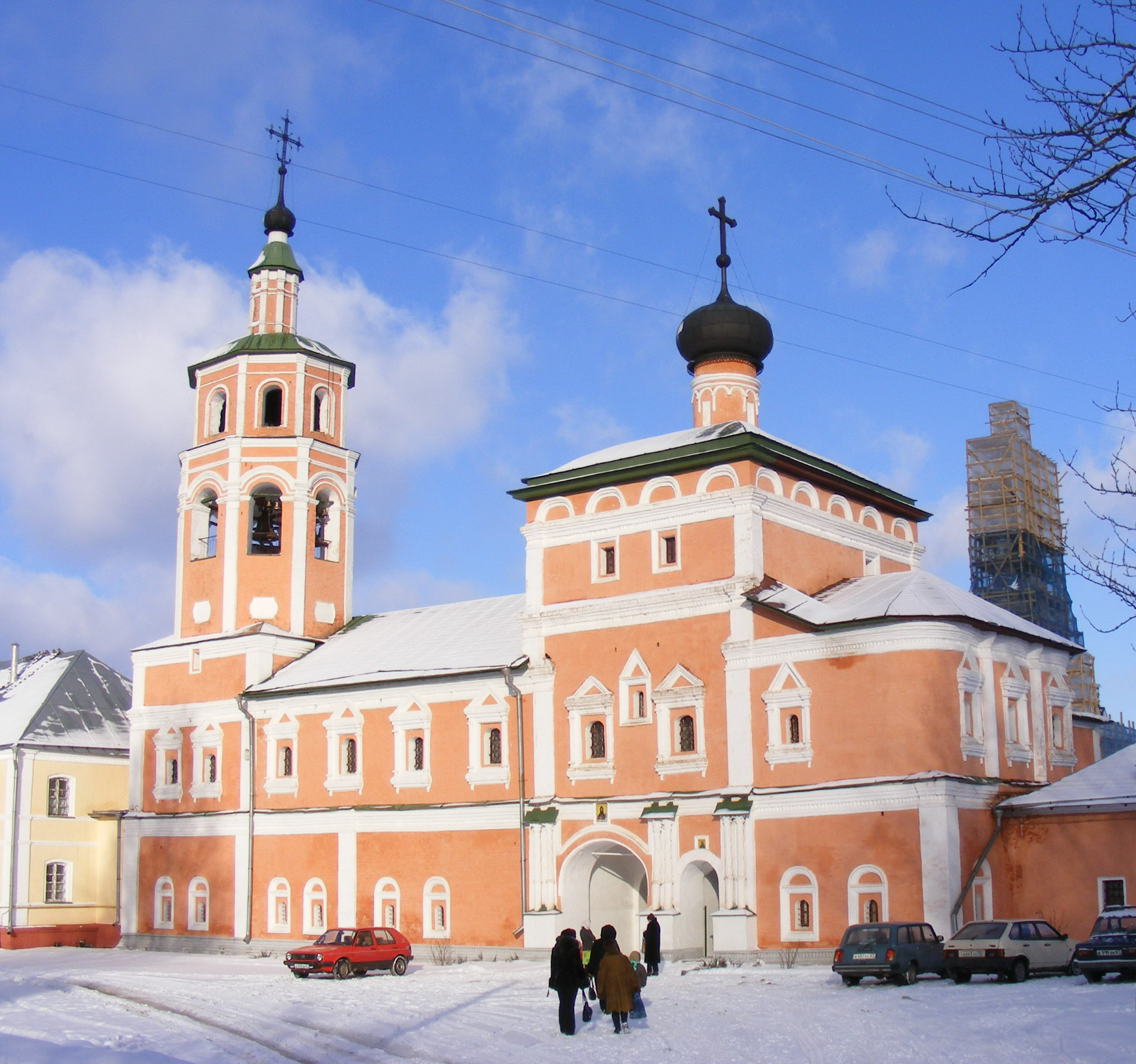
- Ascension Church of the Ioanno-Predtechensky Monastery

Monastery information
- Denomination: Orthodoxy
- Established: 1535
- Diocese: Vyazma Eparchy

Site
- Coordinates: 55.207°N 34.272°E

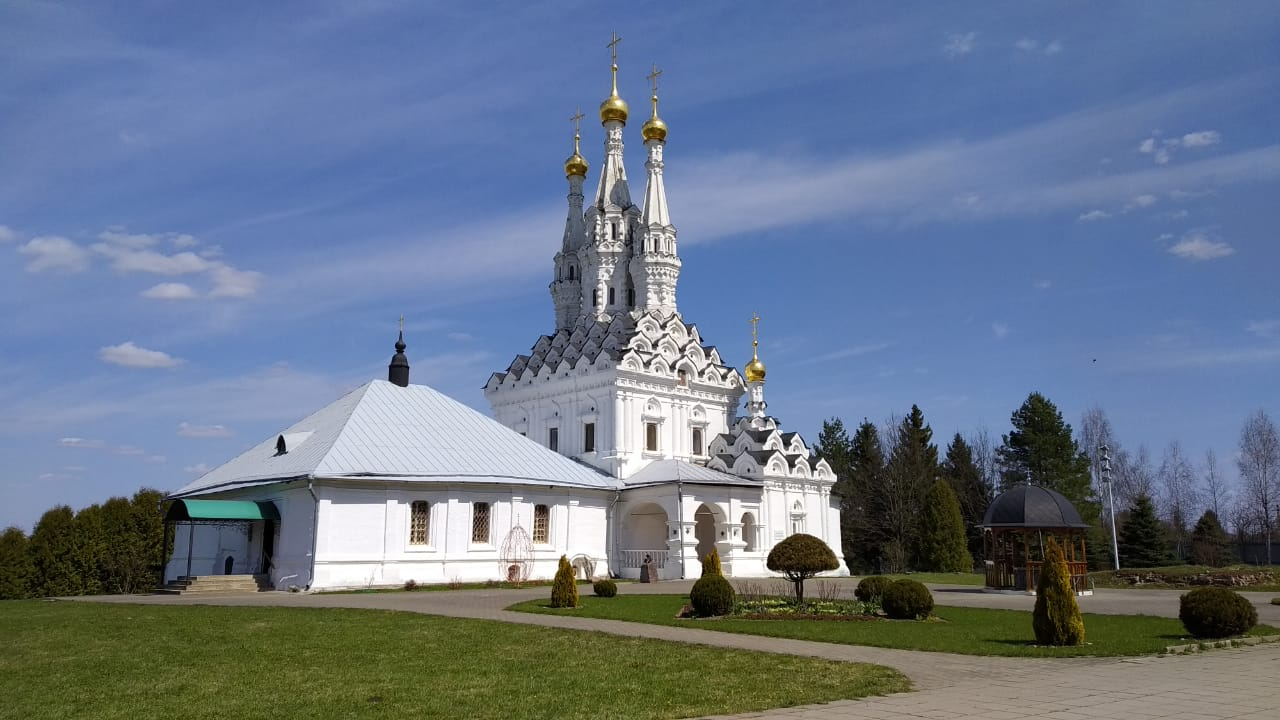
Church of the Smolensk Hodegetria in the Ioanno-Predtechensky Monastery

The Ioanno-Predtechensky Monastery is a convent, formerly a male monastery, belonging to the Vyazma eparchy of the Russian Orthodox Church and located in the city of Vyazma, Smolensk Oblast.

== History ==
=== Early history ===
The monastery was founded in 1535 by the monk Gerasim Boldinsky, who in 1542 received permission from Metropolitan Makary and tsar Ivan Vasilyevich (Ivan the Terrible) for its construction and consecration as a male monastery.

Sometime in the mid-17th century, the Church of the Icon of our Mother of Smolensk (Smolensk Hodegetria) was built as part of the monastery complex. The exact year for the construction and consecration of the church is unknown, with earlier sources claiming it took place between 1635 and 1638 and earlier research pointing to a date after 1654. The church is unique in being one of the few surviving three-tented churches in Russia and a representative of the uzoroche architectural style prevalent in Russia at the time. Tented churches fell from favour under Patriarch Nikon, who forbade their construction, making the Hodegetria church in Vyazma one of less than a handful of surviving examples.

=== Soviet period ===
The monastery was closed down by the Bolsheviks, although the church continued to function until 1929, when it was closed and turned over into a match factory. The monastery suffered damage during World War II, and the refectory was turned into a city archive in 1946. The complex subsequently housed a brewery, workshops for a society for the blind and warehouses for the city. The monastery's fortunes only changed in the 60's, when architect and Vyazma Oblast native Pyotr Baranovsky started a series of restoration works on the complex that lasted until the early 21st century. A plaque commemorating Baranovsky was unveiled in 2017. The monastery was returned in its entirety to the Orthodox Church on May 26, 1989.

=== Recent history ===
Since the dissolution of the USSR the monastery was visited by Patriarchs Alexy and Kirill. In 1995 the monastery was turned into a convent, currently headed by sister Lavrentiya (Pavlyuchenkova). As is the case for many monasteries in Russia, it is maintained by donations and voluntary work by the faithful. A small bakery sells homemade pastries and other foodstuffs to the public for the benefit of the monastery.
