= Red Square =

Square in Moscow, Russia

Kremlin and Red Square, Moscow
UNESCO World Heritage Site
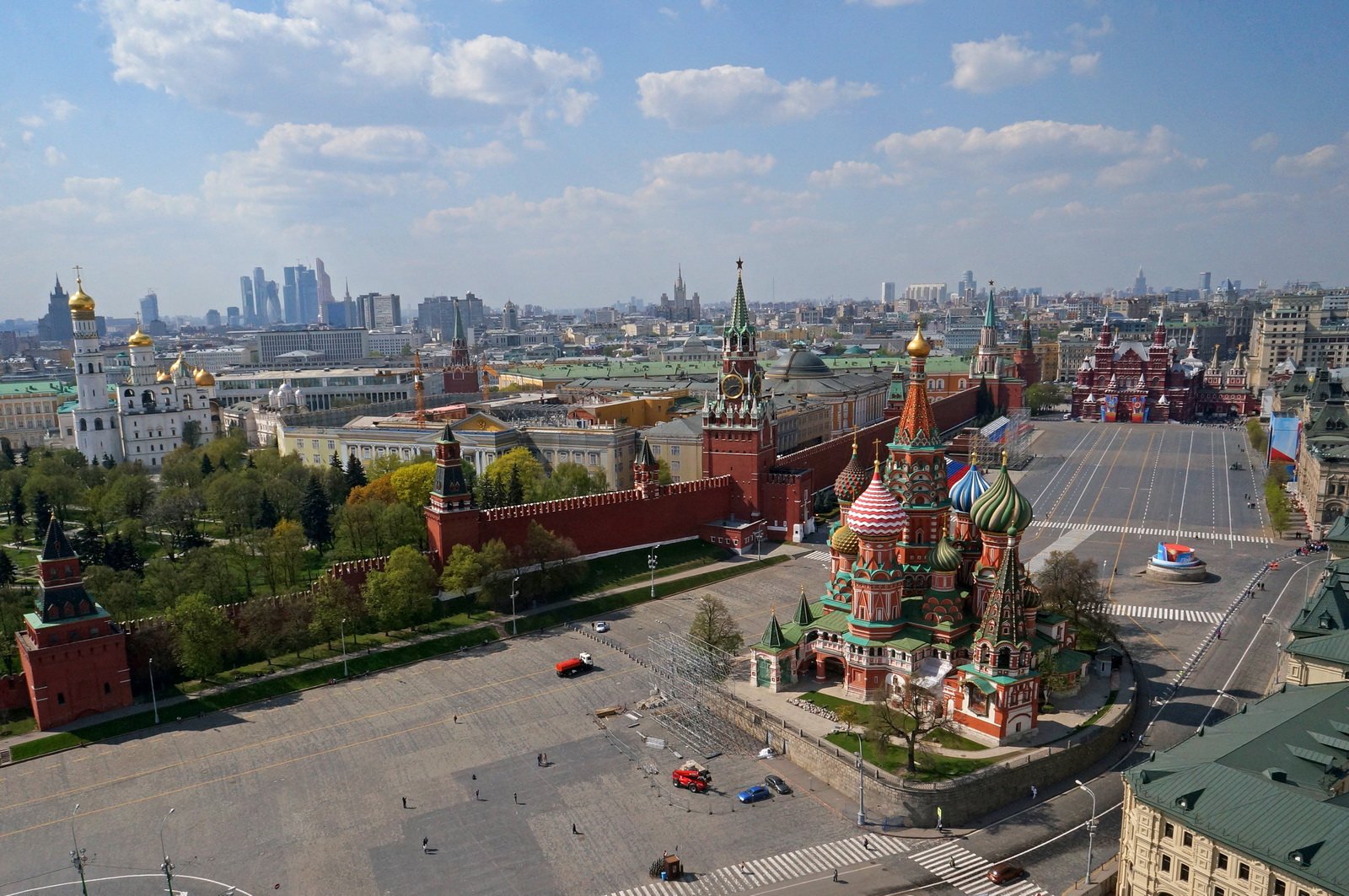
- Aerial view of Red Square, 2014

- Location within Central Moscow Location within Russia Location within Europe
- Location: Moscow, Russia
- Criteria: Cultural: i, ii, iv, r ,87
- Reference: 545
- Inscription: 1990 (14th Session)
- Coordinates: 55°45′15″N 37°37′12″E

Red Square (Russian: Красная площадь, romanized: Krasnaya ploshchad', IPA: [ˈkrasnəjə ˈploɕːɪtʲ]) is one of the oldest and largest squares in Moscow, Russia. It is in Moscow's historic centre, along the eastern walls of the Kremlin. It is the city's most prominent landmark, with famous buildings such as Saint Basil's Cathedral, Lenin's Mausoleum, the State Historical Museum and the GUM department store. It has been a UNESCO World Heritage Site since 1990. Red Square has been the scene of executions, demonstrations, riots, parades, and speeches. Almost 73,000 square metres (800,000 square feet), it lies directly east of the Kremlin and north of the Moskva River. A moat that separated the square from the Kremlin was paved over in 1812.

== Location ==
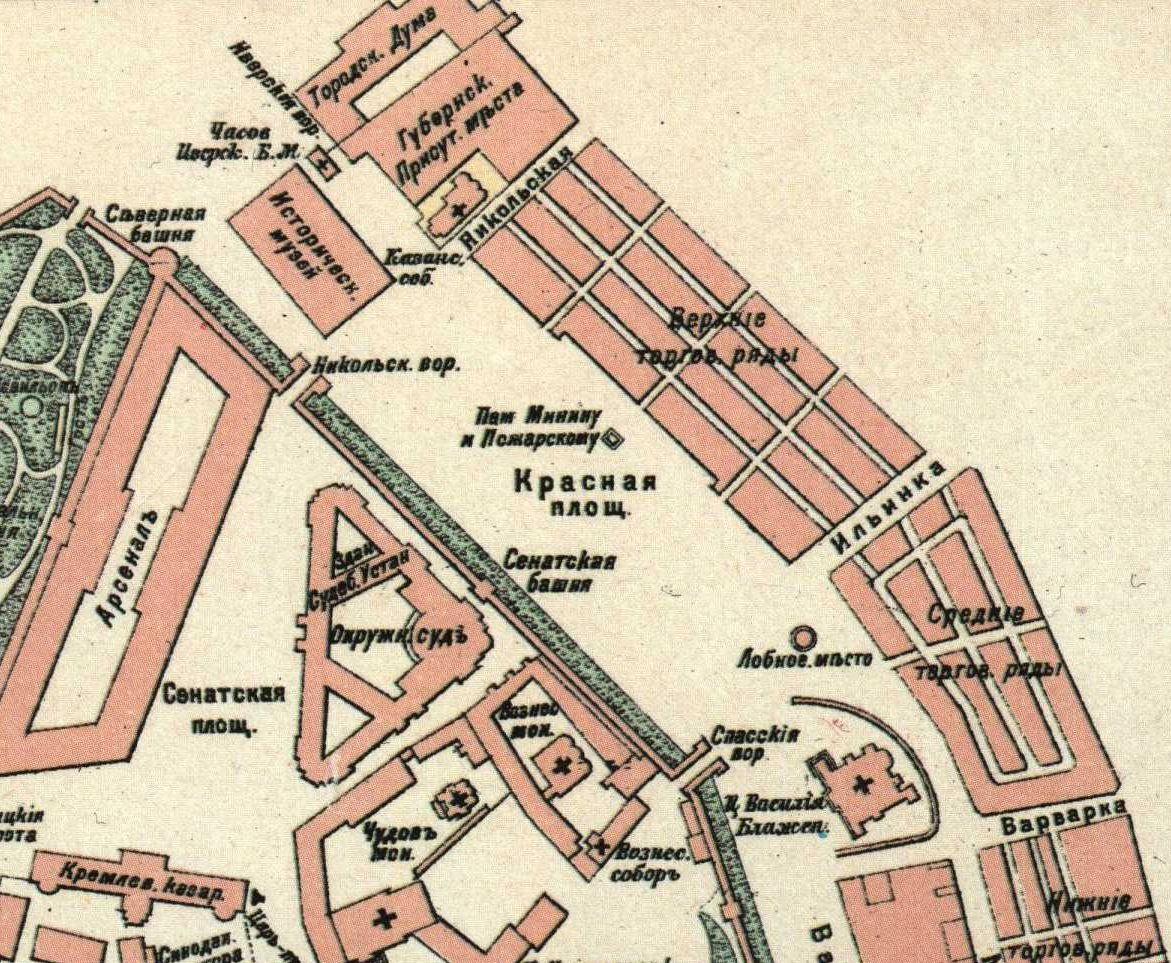
Map of Red Square from 1917

Red Square has an almost rectangular shape and is 70 meters wide and 330 meters long. It extends lengthways from northwest to southeast along part of the wall of the Kremlin that forms its boundary on the southwest side. In the northeast, the square is bounded by the GUM department store building and the old district of Kitay-gorod, in the northwest by the State Historical Museum and the Resurrection Gate and in the southeast by Saint Basil's Cathedral. Tverskaya Street begins to the northwest of the square behind the building of the State Historical Museum, and to the southeast is the so-called Basilius slope, which leads to the Moskva River, which goes down and over a bridge to the Zamoskvorechye District. Two streets branch off to the northeast from Red Square: Nikolskaya Street, which is named after the Nikolaus Tower of the Kremlin, which is directly opposite, and the Ilyinka (Ильинка), both of which have existed since the 14th century and were once important arteries of old Moscow. Today the square itself, with the exception of the access road leading through it to the Savior Gate of the Kremlin, is a pedestrian zone.

== Origin and name ==
The main squares in Russian cities, such as those in Suzdal, Yelets, and Pereslavl-Zalessky, are frequently named Krasnaya ploshchad, or Beautiful Square. Archaically, the Russian word красная (krasnaya) meant 'beautiful', but now means 'red'. The current word for 'beautiful' is красивая (krasivaya), which is derived from it.

In Moscow, the name Red Square originally described the small area between St. Basil's Cathedral, the Spasskaya Tower of the Kremlin, and the Lobnoye Mesto herald's platform. Tsar Alexei Mikhailovich officially extended the name to encompass the entire square, which had previously been called пожар Pozhar, or "burnt-out place", reflecting that previous buildings occupying the site had burned down.

== History ==
The history of Red Square is reflected in paintings by Vasily Surikov, Konstantin Yuon and others. The square was meant to serve as Moscow's main marketplace. It was also the site of various public ceremonies and proclamations, and occasionally a coronation for Russia's Tsars would take place. The square has been gradually built up since that point and has been used for official ceremonies by all Russian governments since it was established.

=== Before the 18th century ===
The East side of the Kremlin triangle, lying adjacent to Red Square and situated between the rivers Moskva and the now underground Neglinnaya River was deemed the most vulnerable side of the Kremlin to attack, since it was neither protected by the rivers, nor any other natural barriers, as the other sides were. Therefore, the Kremlin wall was built to its greatest height on this side, and the Italian architects involved in the building of these fortifications convinced Ivan the Great to clear the area outside of the walls to create a field for shooting. The relevant decrees were issued in 1493 and 1495. They called for the demolition of all buildings within 110 sazhens (234 meters (768 ft)) of the wall.

From 1508 to 1516, the Italian architect Aloisio the New arranged for the construction of a moat in front of the Eastern wall, which would connect the Moskva and Neglinnaya and be filled in with water from Neglinnaya. This moat, known as the Alevizov moat having a length of 541 meters (1,775 ft) and width of 36 meters (118 ft), as well as a depth of 9.5–13 m was lined with limestone and, in 1533, fenced on both sides with low, 4 meters (13 ft)-thick cogged brick walls. Three square gates existed on this side of the wall, which in the 17th century, were known as: Konstantino-Eleninsky, Spassky, Nikolsky (owing their names to the icons of Constantine and Helen, as well as Christ the Savior and St. Nicholas which hung over them). The last two are directly opposite Red Square, while the Konstantino-Elenensky gate was located behind Saint Basil's Cathedral. In the early 19th century, the Arch of Konstantino-Elenensky gate was paved with bricks, but the Spassky Gate was the main front gate of the Kremlin and used for royal entrances. From this gate, wooden and (following the 17th century improvements) stone bridges stretched across the moat. Books were sold on this bridge and stone platforms were built nearby for guns – "raskats". The Tsar Cannon was located on the platform of the Lobnoye mesto.

The square was called Veliky Torg ('Great Market') or simply Torg ('Market'), then Troitskaya by the name of the small Troitskaya ('Trinity') Church, burnt down in the great fire during the Tatar invasion in 1571. After that, the square held the name Pozhar, which means 'burnt'. It was not until 1661–62 that it was first mentioned by its contemporary Krasnaya name.

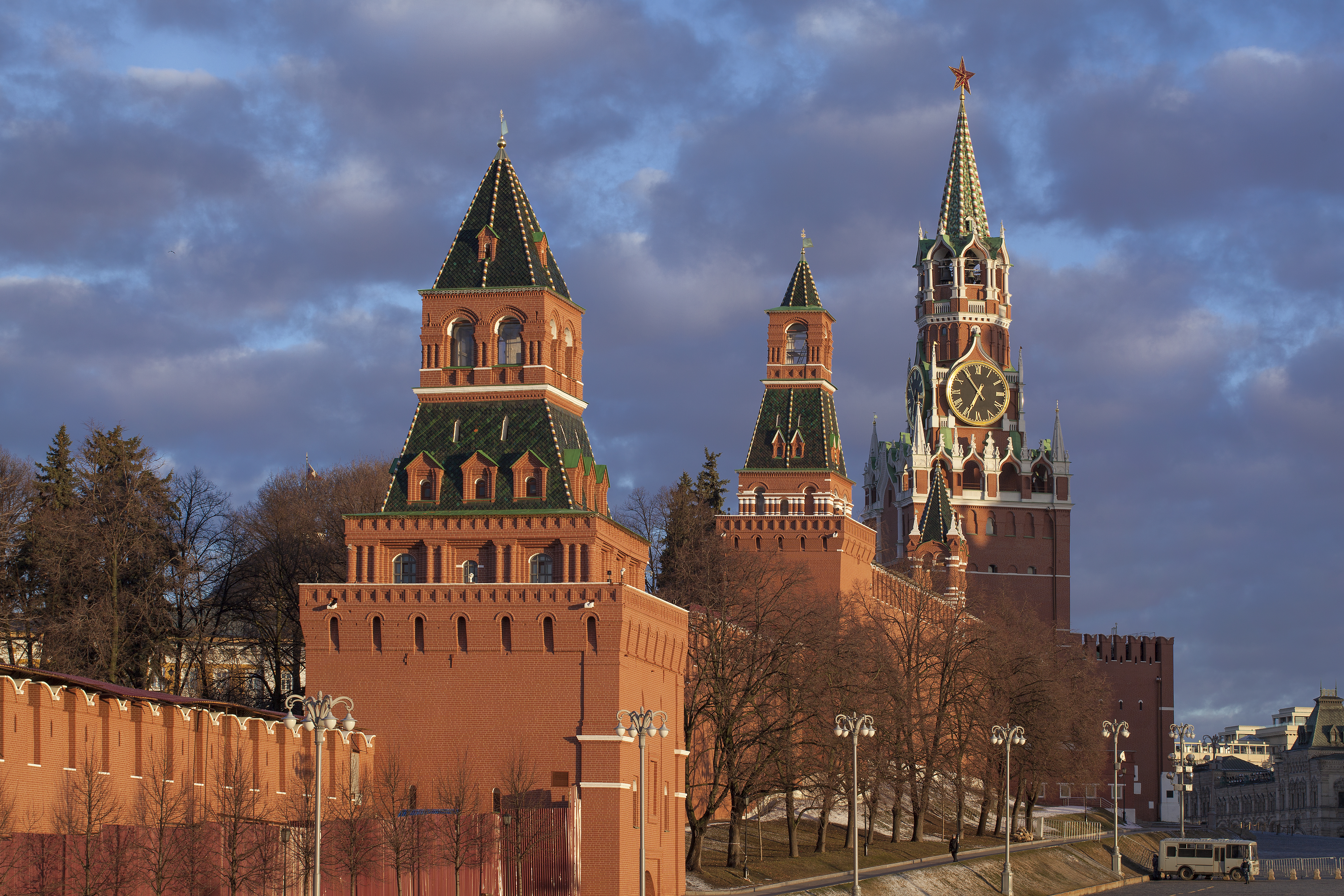
Moscow Kremlin (finished 1495)

Red Square was then the foremost landing stage and trading center for Moscow. Even though Ivan the Great decreed that trade should only be conducted from person to person, in time, these rules were relaxed, and permanent market buildings began appearing on the square. After a fire in 1547, Ivan the Terrible reorganized the wooden shops that lined its eastern side into market lines. The streets Ilyinka and Varvarka were divided into the Upper lines (now GUM department store), Middle lines and Bottom lines, although Bottom Lines were already in Zaryadye.

After a few years, the Cathedral of Intercession of the Virgin, commonly known as Saint Basil's Cathedral, was built on the moat under the rule of Ivan IV. This was the first building which gave the square its present-day characteristic silhouette (pyramidal roofs had not yet been built on the Kremlin towers). In 1595, the wooden market lines were replaced with stone. By that time, a brick platform for the proclamation of the tsar's edicts, known as Lobnoye Mesto, had also been constructed.

Red Square was considered a sacred place. Various festive processions were held there, and during Palm Sunday, the famous "procession on a donkey" was arranged, in which the patriarch, sitting on a donkey, accompanied by the tsar and the people went out of Saint Basil's Cathedral in the Kremlin.

During the expulsion of the Polish army from Moscow in 1612, Prince Dmitry Pozharsky entered the Kremlin through the square. In memory of this event, he built the Kazan Cathedral in honor of the "Kazan Icon of the Mother of God", which had followed his army in a campaign.

At the same time (1624–1625), the Spasskaya tower received contemporary tent roofs. This was done on the proposal and subsequent draft of Christopher Galloway from Scotland, who was summoned to design the new tower's clock and suggested the arrangement of the tent roof over the clock. In mid-century, a gilded double-headed eagle was set on top of the tower. After this, the square became known as Krasivaya (lit. 'beautiful').

In the late 17th century (1679–1680), the square was cleared of all wooden structures. Then all Kremlin towers received tent roofs, except Nikolskaya. One tent was erected on the wall above Red Square (the so‑called Tsarskaya Tower, so that the tsar could watch from this spot the ceremonies in the square). Tent roofs were also constructed at Voskrerensky (Iberian) gates, arranged in the wall of Kitai-gorod. These were the fortified gates at Voskresensky Bridge over the River Neglinnaya.

In 1697 and 1699, gates on both sides of Voskresensky Bridge were rebuilt into large stone buildings: the Mint and Zemsky prikaz (department in charge of urban and police matters). Zemsky prikaz (on the site of current Historical Museum) was then known as the Main Pharmacy, founded under orders of Peter The Great. In 1755 the first Russian University was originally housed in the building of Zemsky prikaz, before moving to the better known building on Mokhovaya street further across Manege Square. At the same time the (by then already drained) Alevizov moat was used as a state Pharmacy's garden for growing medicinal plants.

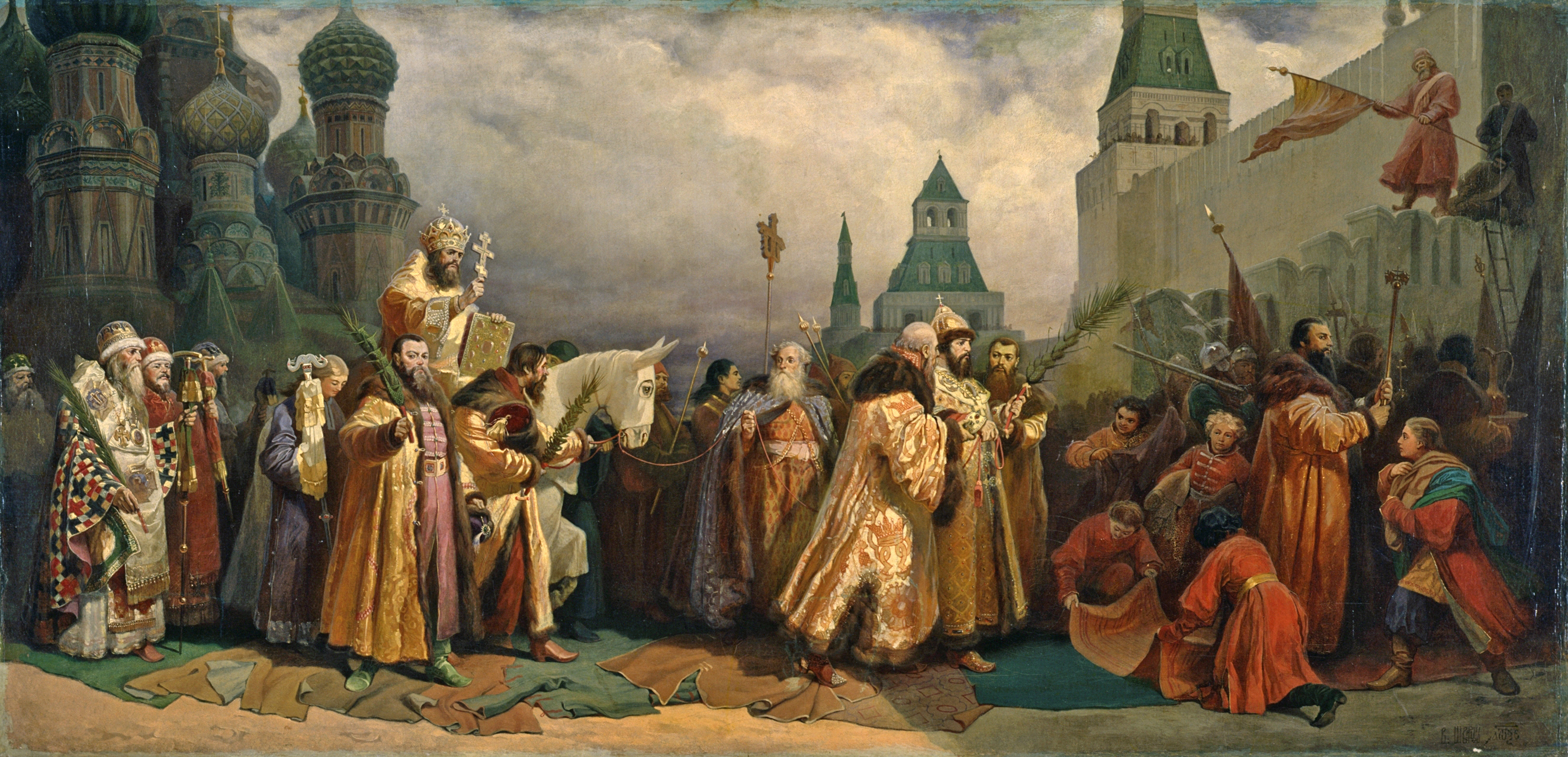
17th century Palm Sunday procession leaving Saint Basil for Kremlin.

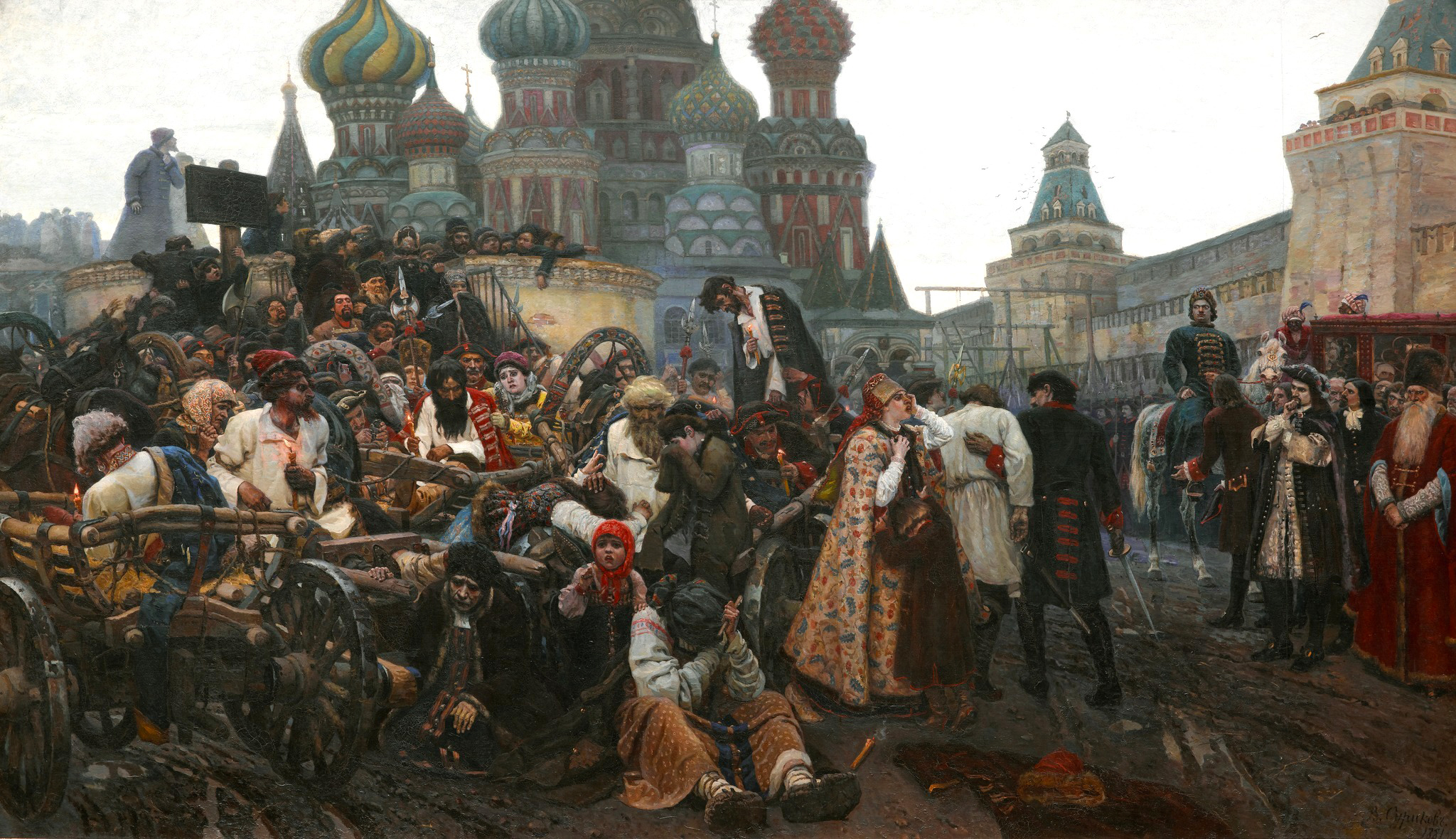
Execution of streltsy by Tsar Peter I (to the right on a horse) in Red Square, 1698 (painted 1881)
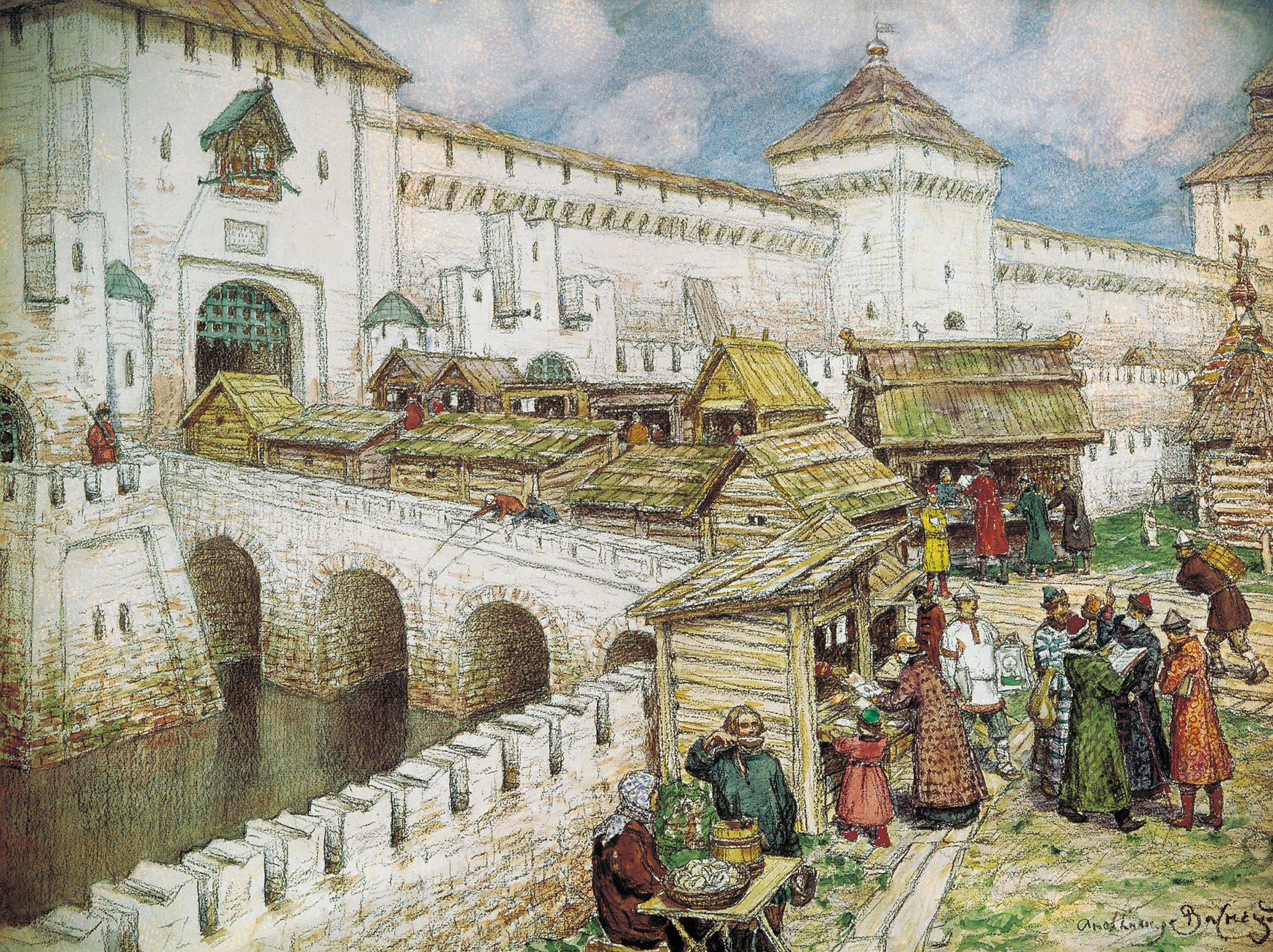
Book shops at the Spassky bridge at the main gate of the Kremlin

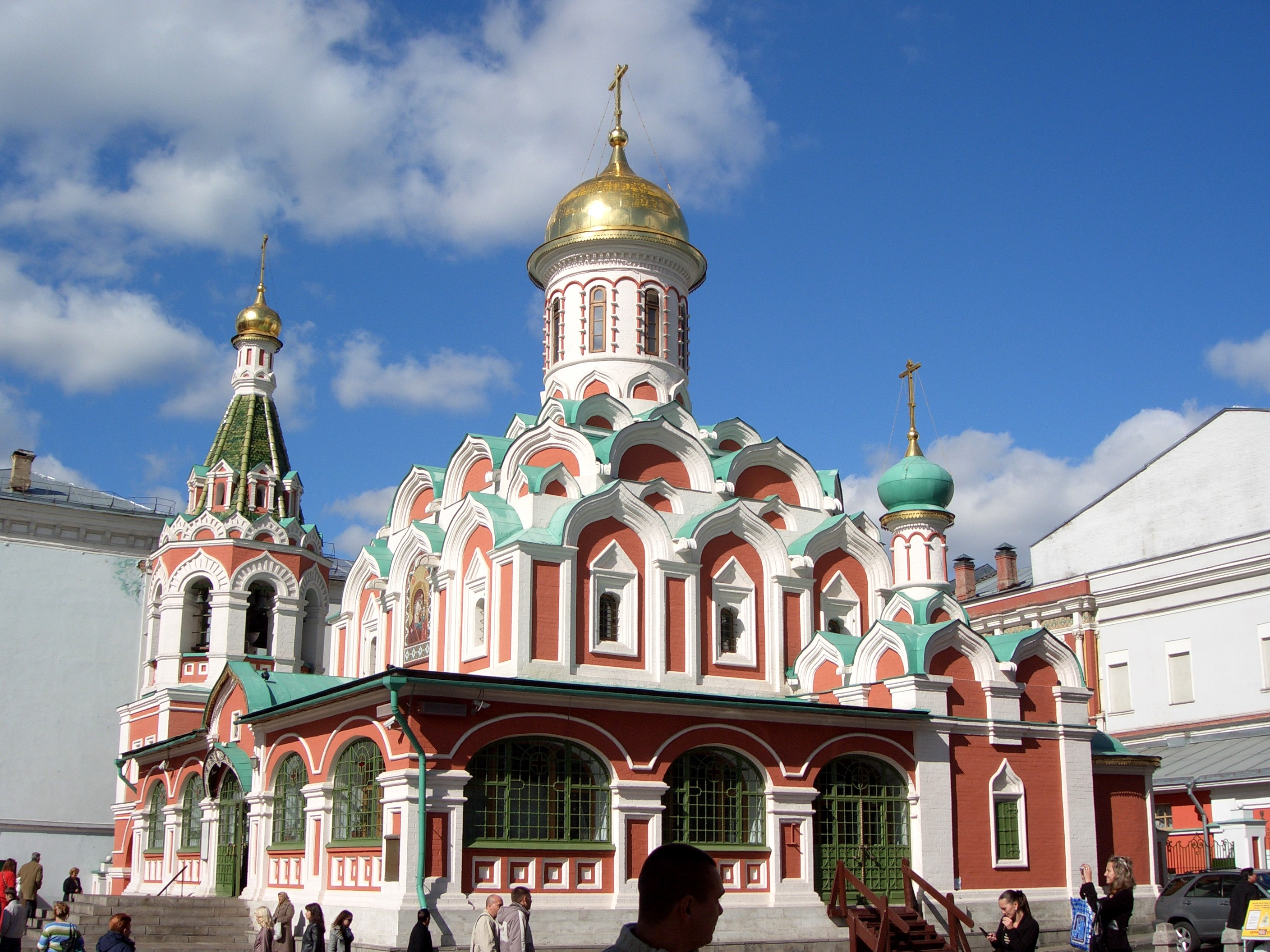
Kazan Cathedral (1993 reconstruction, it originates back to 1612–25)

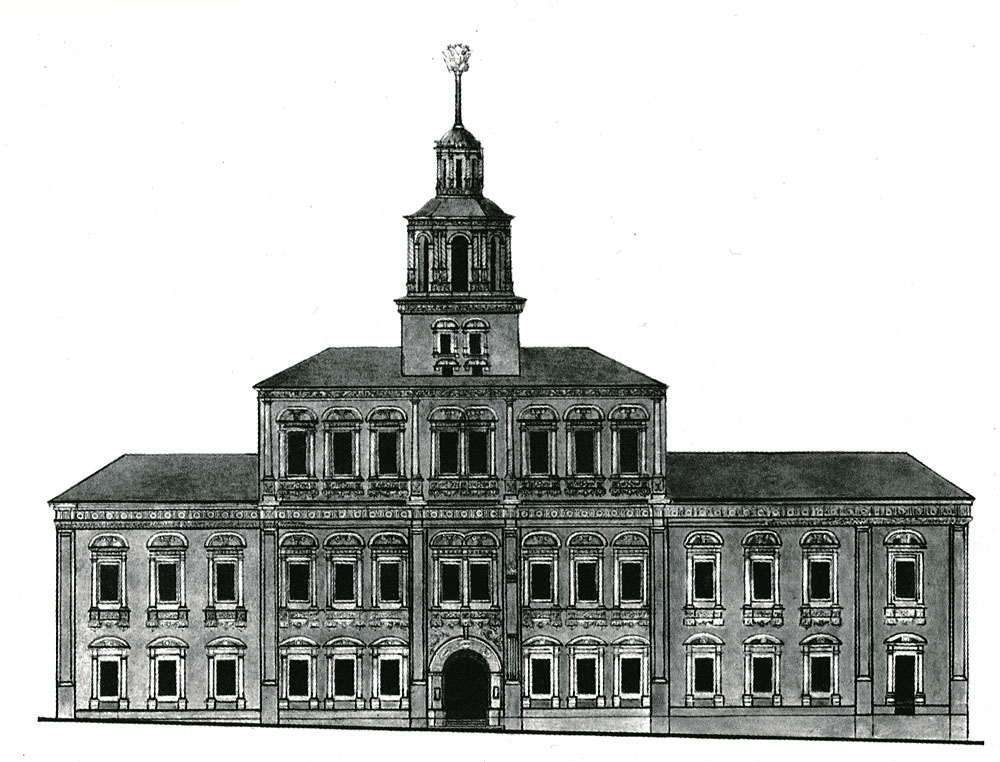
Zemsky prikaz, town hall built 1700

=== 18th century ===
In 1702, the first public theater in Russia was built near the Nikolsky gate. It existed until 1737, when it was destroyed in a fire. In the 1730s, a new mint building, called the Gubernskoye pravlenie (Provincial Board), was built in front of the old one.

During her reign, Catherine the Great decided to make improvements to the square. In 1786, the upper floor of the market lines was made of stone. This line was built on the opposite side of the square, near a moat between the Spasskaya and Nikolskaya towers. Then architect Matvey Kazakov built (in the old forms) the new Lobnoye mesto of hewn stone, slightly West of the place where it was before.

=== 19th and early 20th centuries ===
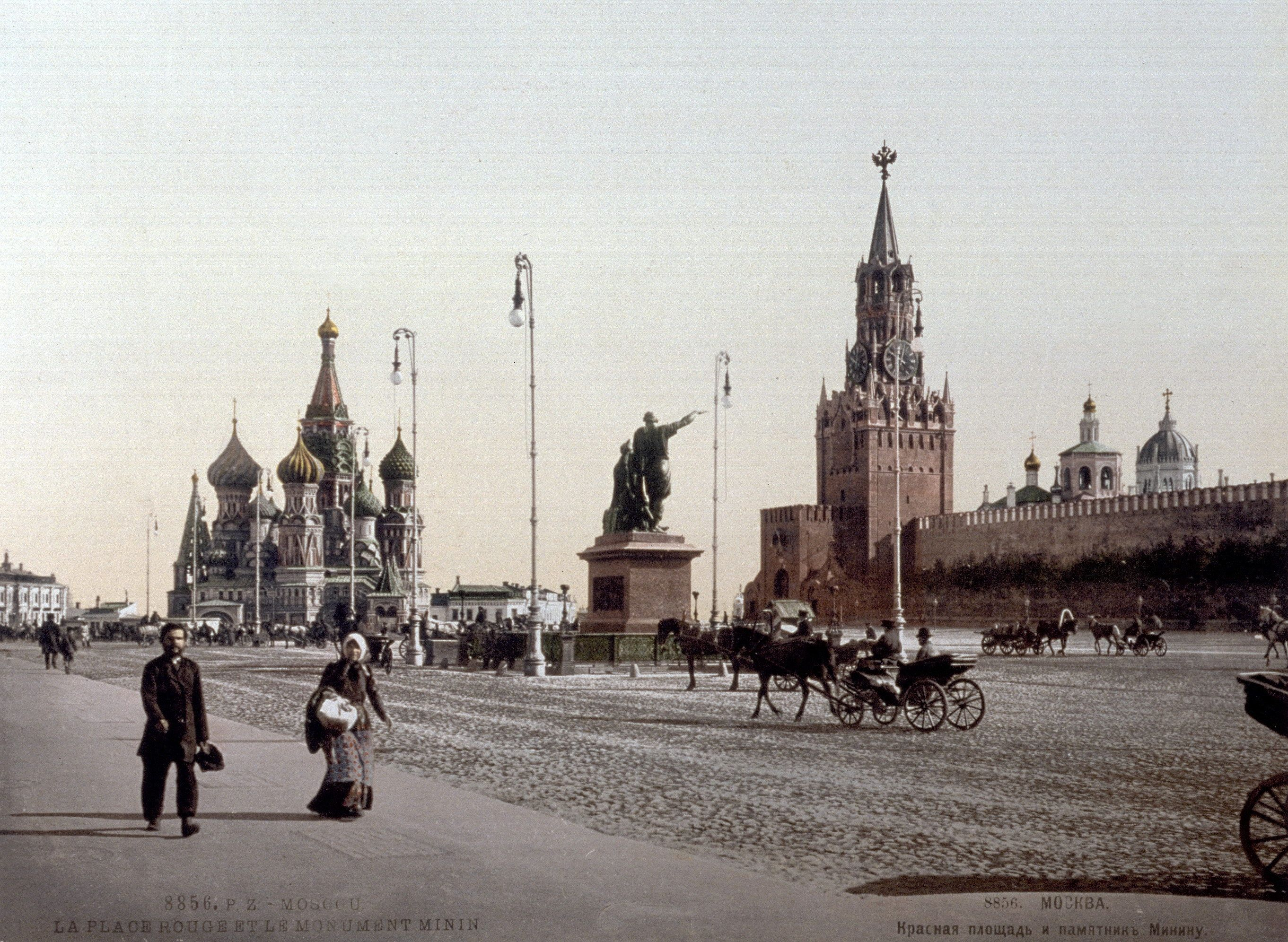
A view of the Red Square in 1896.

In 1804, at the request of merchants, the square was paved in stone. In 1806 Nikolskaya Tower was reconstructed in the Gothic style, and received a tent roof. The new phase of improvement of the square began after the Napoleonic invasion and fire in 1812. The moat was filled in 1813 and in its place, rows of trees were planted. The market Line along the moat, dilapidated after the fire, had been demolished, and on the Eastern side, Joseph Bové constructed new building of lines in the Empire style. In 1818 the Monument to Minin and Pozharsky, was erected; its construction symbolized the rise in patriotic consciousness during the war.

In 1874 the historic building of Zemsky prikaz was demolished. In its place the Imperial Historical Museum was built in pseudo-Russian style. After Bové's lines were demolished, new large buildings were erected between 1888 and 1893, also in the pseudo-Russian style: upper lines (GUM department store) and middle lines. The upper lines were intended for retail sale and together in fact comprised the first department store in Moscow. Middle lines were intended for wholesale trade. At the same time (in 1892) the square was illuminated by electric lanterns. In 1909 a tram appeared on the square for the first time.

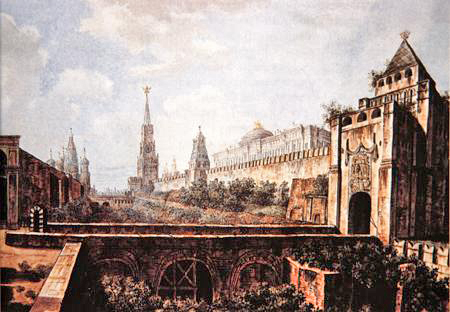
The Kremlin with Alevizov moat and Nikolskaya Tower in front. By Fyodor Alekseyev, 1800

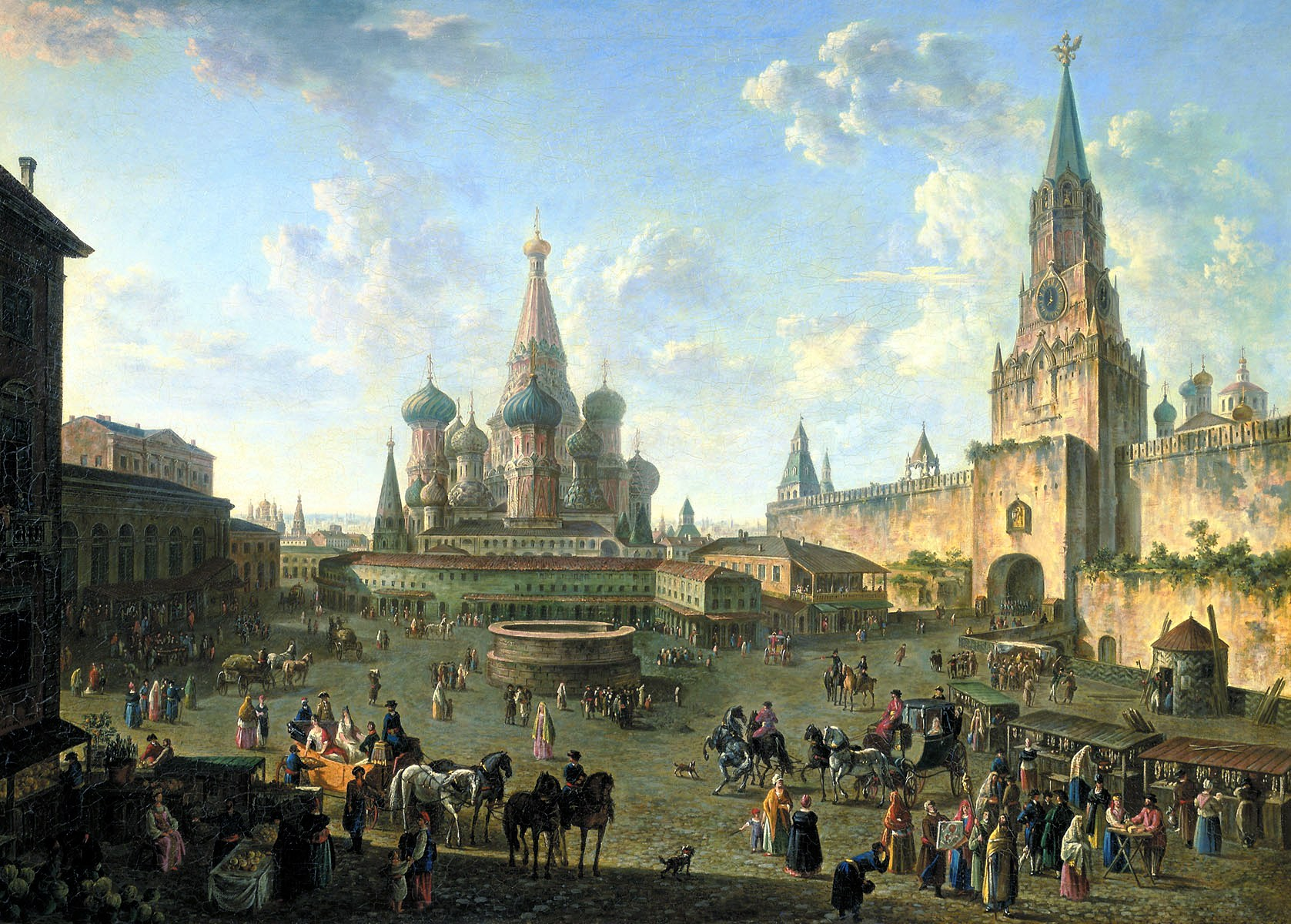
Red Square with St. Basil's Cathedral and Moscow Kremlin in background, by Fyodor Alekseyev, 1801

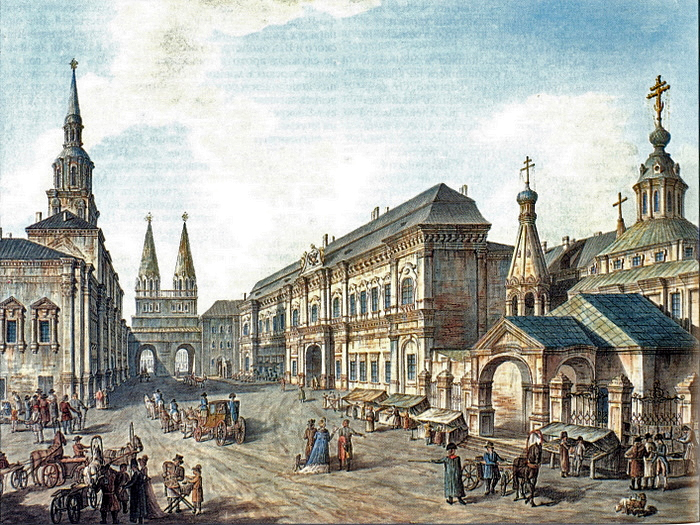
Left-right: Zemsky prikaz, Voskresensky gates, Provincial Board and Kazan Cathedral, 1802

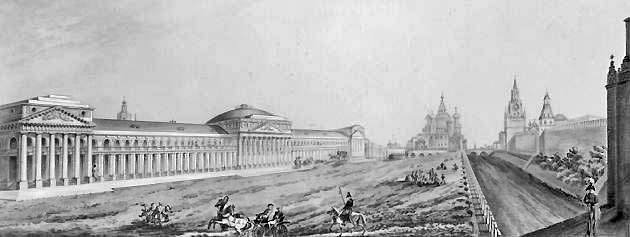
Left-right: market lines by Bove, Saint Basil and Kremlin. View from 1816. Market lines were replaced by GUM store in 1893

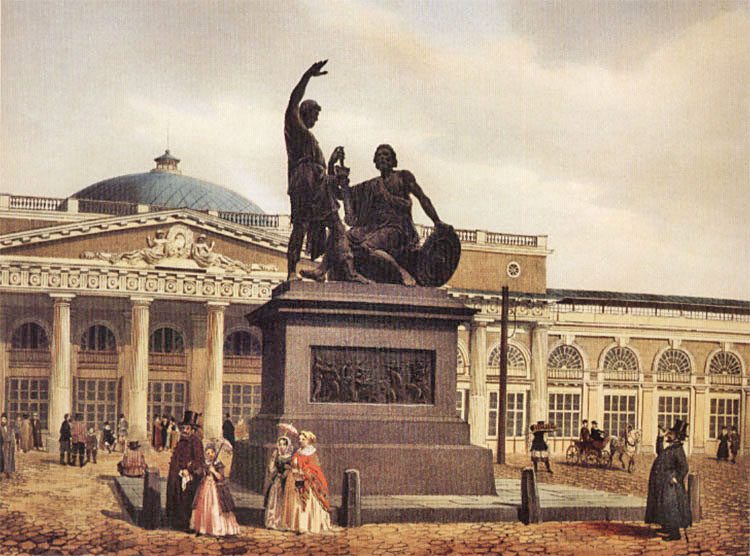
Minin-Pozharsky monument from 1818 commemorating the expulsion of the Polish forces from Moscow, 19th century

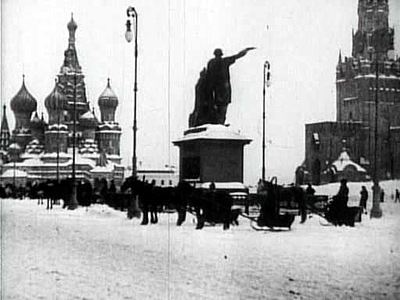
Saint Basil's Cathedral, Monument to Minin and Pozharsky and Spasskaya Tower in 1908

=== Soviet era and modern era ===
During the Soviet era, Red Square maintained its significance, becoming a focal point for the new state. Besides being the official address of the Soviet government, it was renowned as a showcase for military parades from 1919 onward. Lenin's Mausoleum would from 1924 onward be a part of the square complex, and also as the grandstand for important dignitaries in all national celebrations. In the 1930s, Kazan Cathedral and Iverskaya Chapel with the Resurrection Gates were demolished to make room for heavy military vehicles driving through the square (both were later rebuilt after the fall of the Soviet Union). There were plans to demolish Moscow's most recognized building, Saint Basil's Cathedral, as well to make way for a larger Red Square, as well as the State Historical Museum. The legend is that Lazar Kaganovich, Stalin's associate and director of the Moscow reconstruction plan, prepared a special model of Red Square, in which the cathedral could be removed, and brought it to Stalin to show how the cathedral was an obstacle for parades and traffic. But when he jerked the cathedral out of the model, Stalin objected with his rather famous quote: "Lazar! Put it back!". However, no documented evidence exists of this encounter.

In 1963, a group of African students organized a protest on Red Square in response to the alleged murder of a medical student named Edmund Assare-Addo. This was the first recorded political protest on Red Square since the late 1920s. On 28 May 1987 a West German pilot named Mathias Rust landed a Cessna F172P light aircraft at St. Basil next to Red Square, causing a major scandal in the Soviet Air Defense Forces.

In 1990 the Kremlin and Red Square were among the first sites in the USSR added to UNESCO's World Heritage List.

Red Square has also served as a venue for high-profile concerts. Linkin Park, The Prodigy, t.A.T.u., Shakira, Scorpions, Paul McCartney, Roger Waters, Red Hot Chili Peppers, and other celebrities performed there. For the New Year 2006, 2007, and 2008 celebrations, a skating rink was set up on Red Square. Paul McCartney's performance there was a historic moment for many, as The Beatles were banned in the Soviet Union, preventing any live performances there of any of The Beatles. The Soviet Union also banned the sales of Beatles records. While McCartney's performance was historic, he was not the first Beatle to perform in Russia. Former Beatle Ringo Starr and His All Starr Band performed at Moscow's Russia Hall in August 1998. On 4 December 2008 the KHL announced they would be holding their first all-star game outdoors on 10 January at Red Square.

==== Venue for parades ====
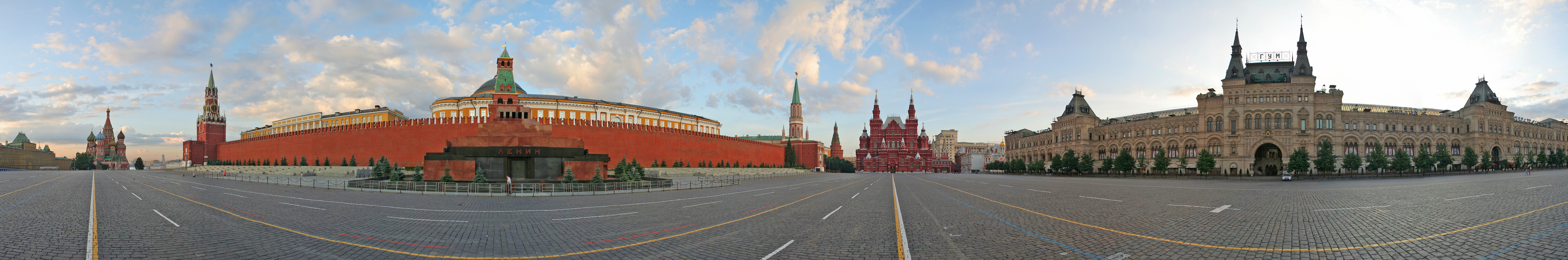
360° Panorama of Red Square: Kremlin (direction: SE), Saint Basil with Lenin Mausoleum (from 1930) in front, State Historical Museum (NW) and GUM store. Hardly seen are Voskresensky gates just to the right of museum, Kazan Cathedral just to the left of GUM store and the Minin-Pozharsky monument in front of Saint Basil (originally it was in front of GUM store).

Two of the most significant military parades on Red Square were 1941 October Revolution Parade, when the city was besieged by Germans and troops were leaving Red Square straight to the front lines, and the Victory Parade in 1945, when the banners of defeated Nazi armies were thrown at the foot of Lenin's Mausoleum. The Soviet Union held many parades in Red Square for May Day (until 1969), Victory Day, and October Revolution Day, which consisted of propaganda, flags, labor demonstration, marching troops, and showing off of tanks and missiles. Individual parades have been held on Defender of the Fatherland Day (23 February 1925), the Day of Tankmen (8 September 1946), and the state funeral of Joseph Stalin (9 March 1953). On Victory Day in 1945, 1965, 1985, and 1990, there were Soviet military marches and parades as well, and since 1995, the annual Moscow Victory Day Parade has been held on the square, marking anniversary of the defeat of Nazi Germany in World War II. The last large-scale Soviet parade commemorating the 73rd anniversary of the October Revolution occurred at the square in 1990.

In January 2008, Russia announced it would resume parading military vehicles through Red Square, although recent restoration of Iverski Gate complicated this, by closing one of existing passages along Historical Museum for the heavy vehicles. In May 2008, Russia held its annual Victory day parade, during which for the first time since the collapse of the USSR in 1991, Russian military vehicles paraded through the square. On 9 May 2010, to commemorate the 65th anniversary of the capitulation of Germany in 1945, the armed forces of France, the United Kingdom, and the United States marched in the Moscow Victory Day parade for the first time in history.

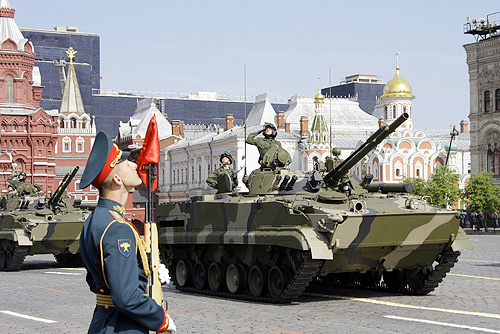
2008 Military parade marking the sixty-third anniversary of Victory in the Great Patriotic War

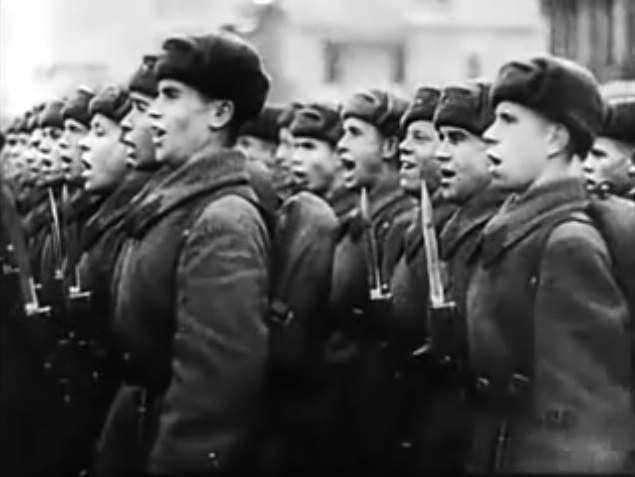
Red Army soldiers cheer Joseph Stalin in Red Square in a scene from the 1942 film Moscow Strikes Back

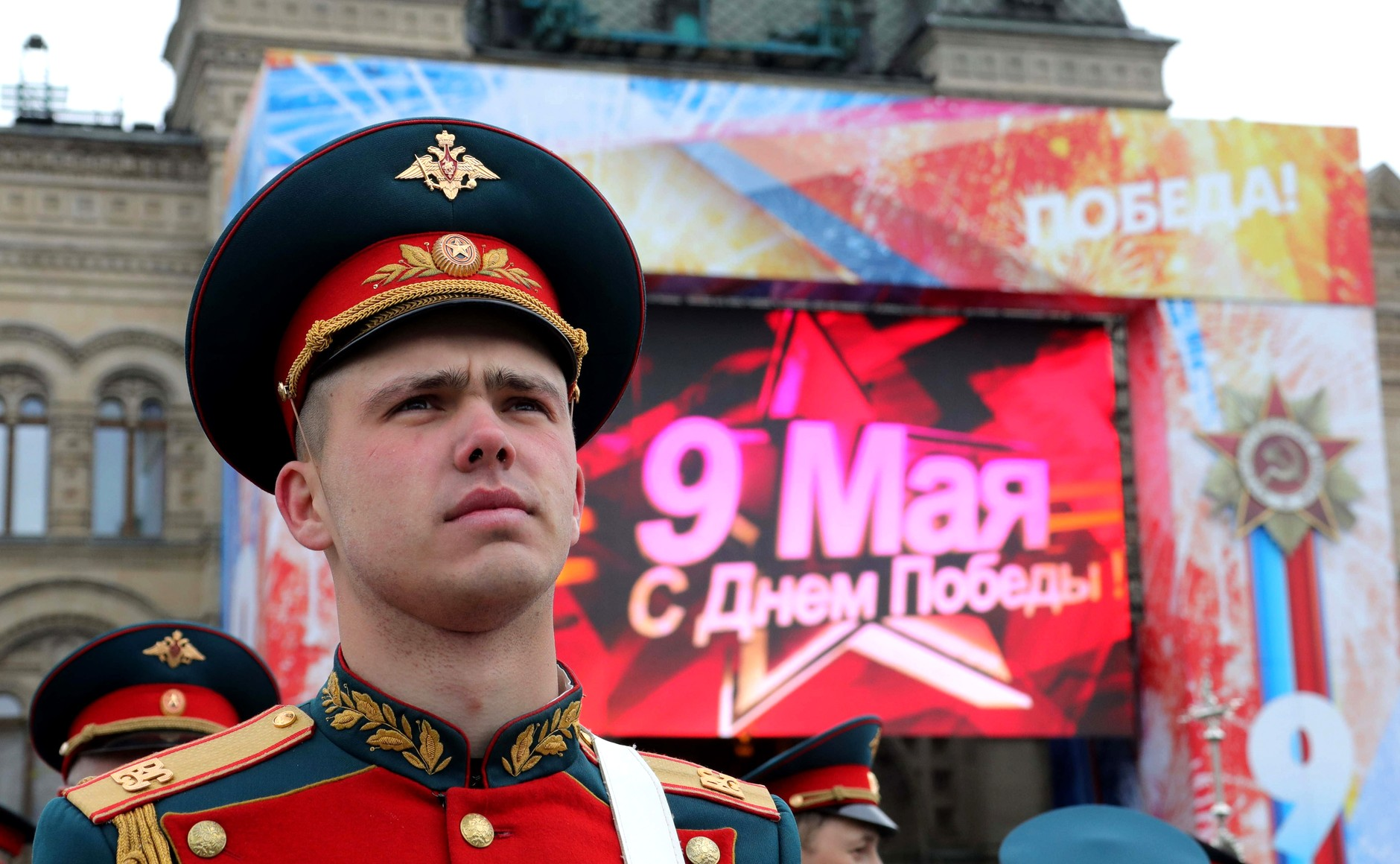
A soldier during a parade on Red Square in 2017.

== Buildings ==
In the following, all of the buildings located directly on Red Square will be presented in a clockwise direction, starting with the State Historical Museum at the northwest end of the square.

=== State Historical Museum ===
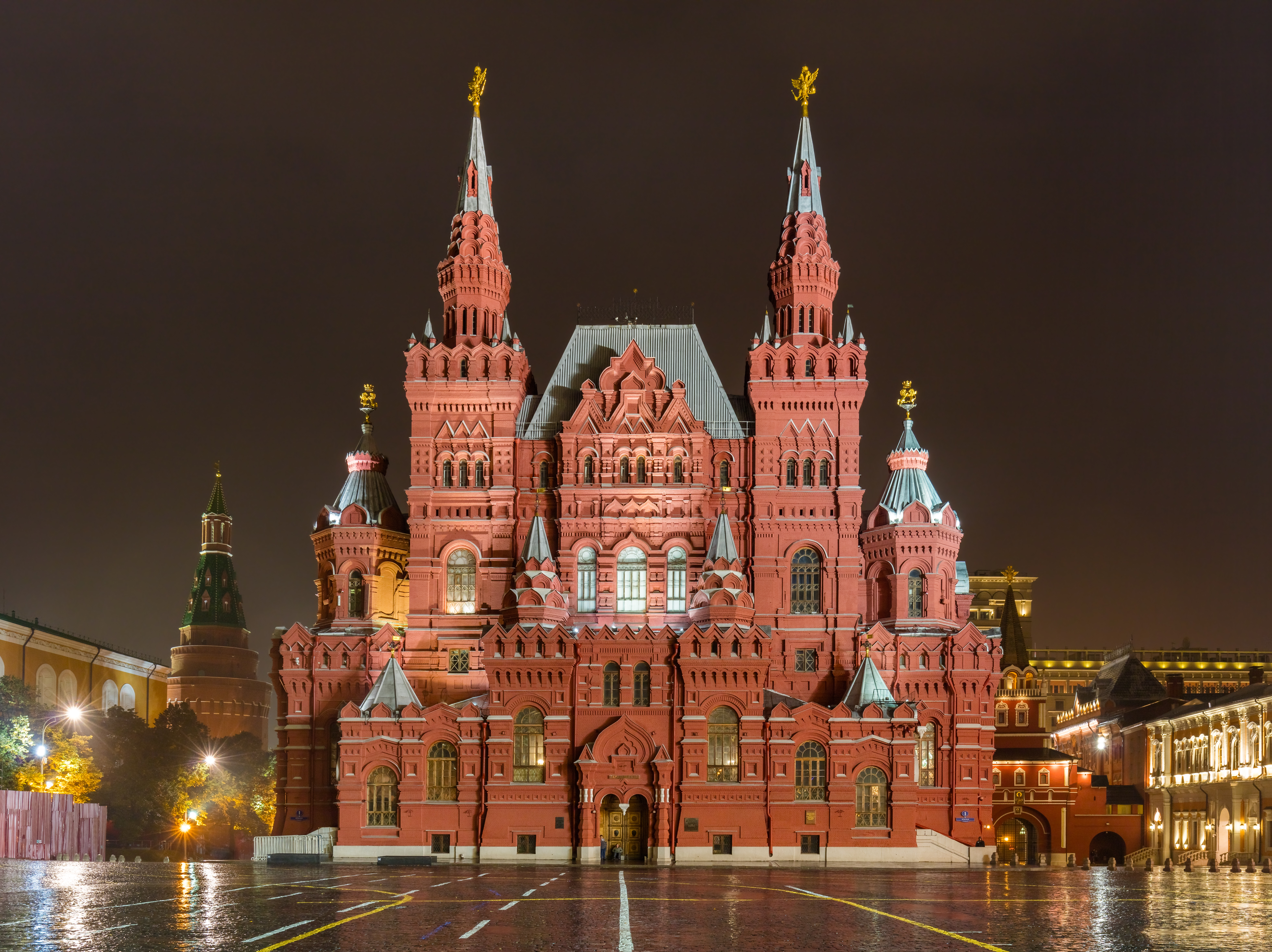
State Historical Museum, as seen from Red Square

The striking dark red building of the State Historical Museum forms the end of Red Square from the north-western side. It was built in the years 1875–1883 and is therefore one of the younger components of the architectural ensemble of Red Square. Before it was built, the first pharmacy building in Moscow stood on this site from the beginning of the 18th century, which was rebuilt in 1755 and served as the first campus of the then newly founded Moscow State University for two decades.

Today's museum building was built especially for the historical museum, which was newly founded in 1872, and was ceremoniously handed over to its destination in May 1883. Its architect was Vladimir Osipovich Sherwood, who is considered to be one of the main representatives of the "Russian style", a variant of historicism based on traditional Russian architecture, which was widely used at the time. The museum building looks correspondingly "Old Russian": the facades are decorated with arched windows and ornaments reminiscent of traditional Russian Orthodox churches, several decorative towers reminiscent of some of the Kremlin towers are attached to the sides, and the shape of the roof is reminiscent of the Great Kremlin Palace in the Kremlin, a form of the Russian mansion that was particularly preferred in the 16th and 17th centuries.

Today the Historical Museum is the largest and most famous history museum in Russia. In 16 specialist departments, it houses around 4.5 million exhibits on Russian history from almost all epochs and also organizes themed special exhibitions several times a year. In addition to the actual museum building, the historical museum complex also includes Saint Basil's Cathedral and the Novodevichy Convent, which is a UNESCO World Heritage site.

=== Resurrection Gate ===
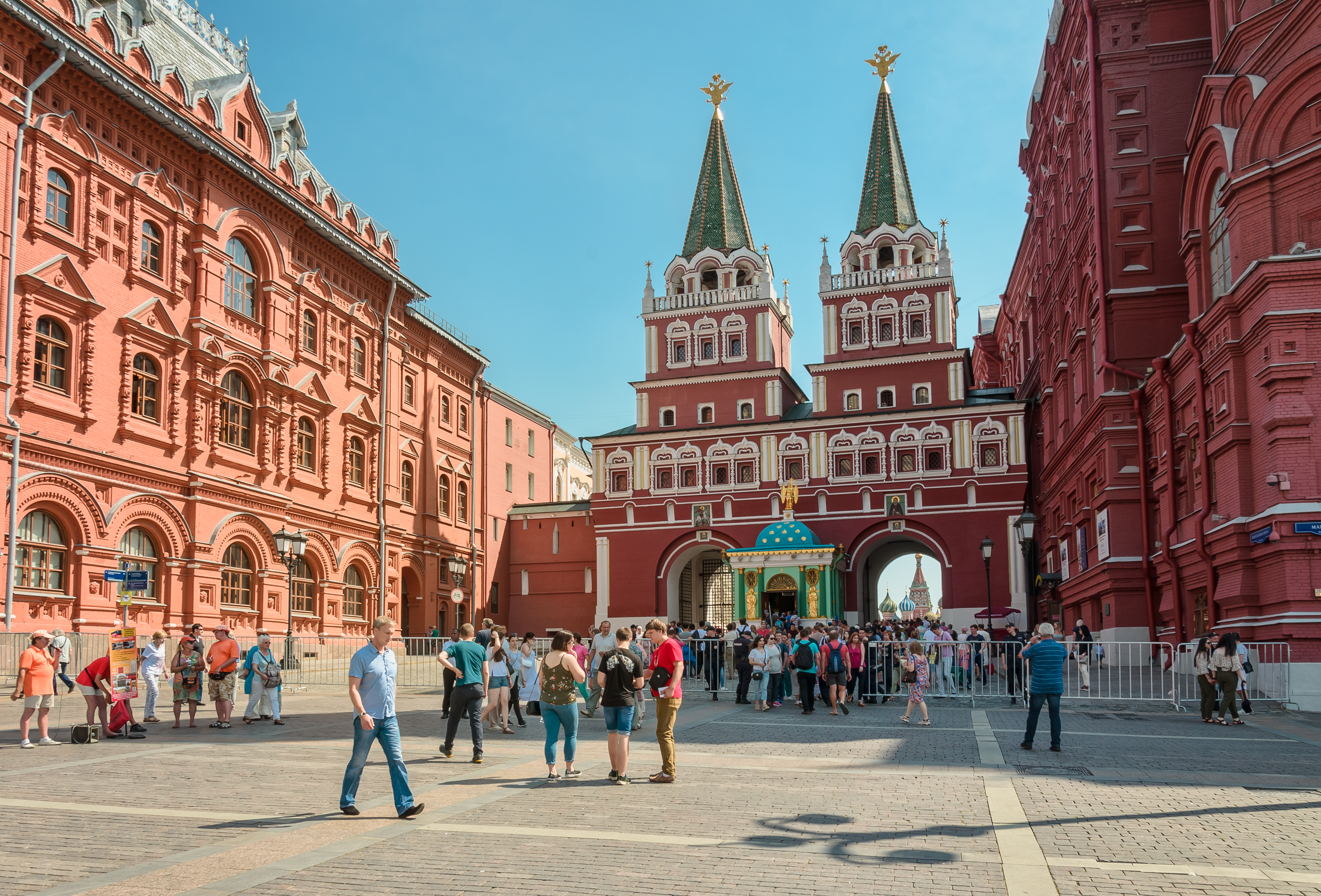
Resurrection Gate, facing southeast

The Resurrection Gate forms one of the two entrances to Red Square from the northwest side. This structure, built for the first time in 1680, was initially part of the Kitai-Gorod fortifications. In its base part it consists of two arched portals, which are crowned in a symmetrical manner by two rectangular towers, the tops of which are strongly reminiscent of the Kremlin towers. Originally, the Resurrection Gate represented part of the architectural ensemble at the northern end of Red Square, which, in addition to the gate, included the affiliated building of the government administration (see below) and the no longer preserved pharmacy building, which had to give way to the History Museum at the end of the 19th century. During the times of the Russian Empire, the gate served as a symbolic entrance gate to the heart of Moscow, especially during major celebrations: the tsars always passed the gate at their coronation celebrations before the coronation was proclaimed in front of the people on Red Square.

In 1931, the new state authorities had the gate dismantled so that it would not obstruct the passage of military technology during major military parades on Red Square. Today's gate is largely a replica of the original and dates from 1996. Between the two portals on the north side of the gate, the chapel of the icon of the Mother of God of Iviron, originally built in 1781, was rebuilt at the same time. A new copy of the icon was made for this chapel on Mount Athos, where the Iviron monastery is located.

=== Former government administration ===
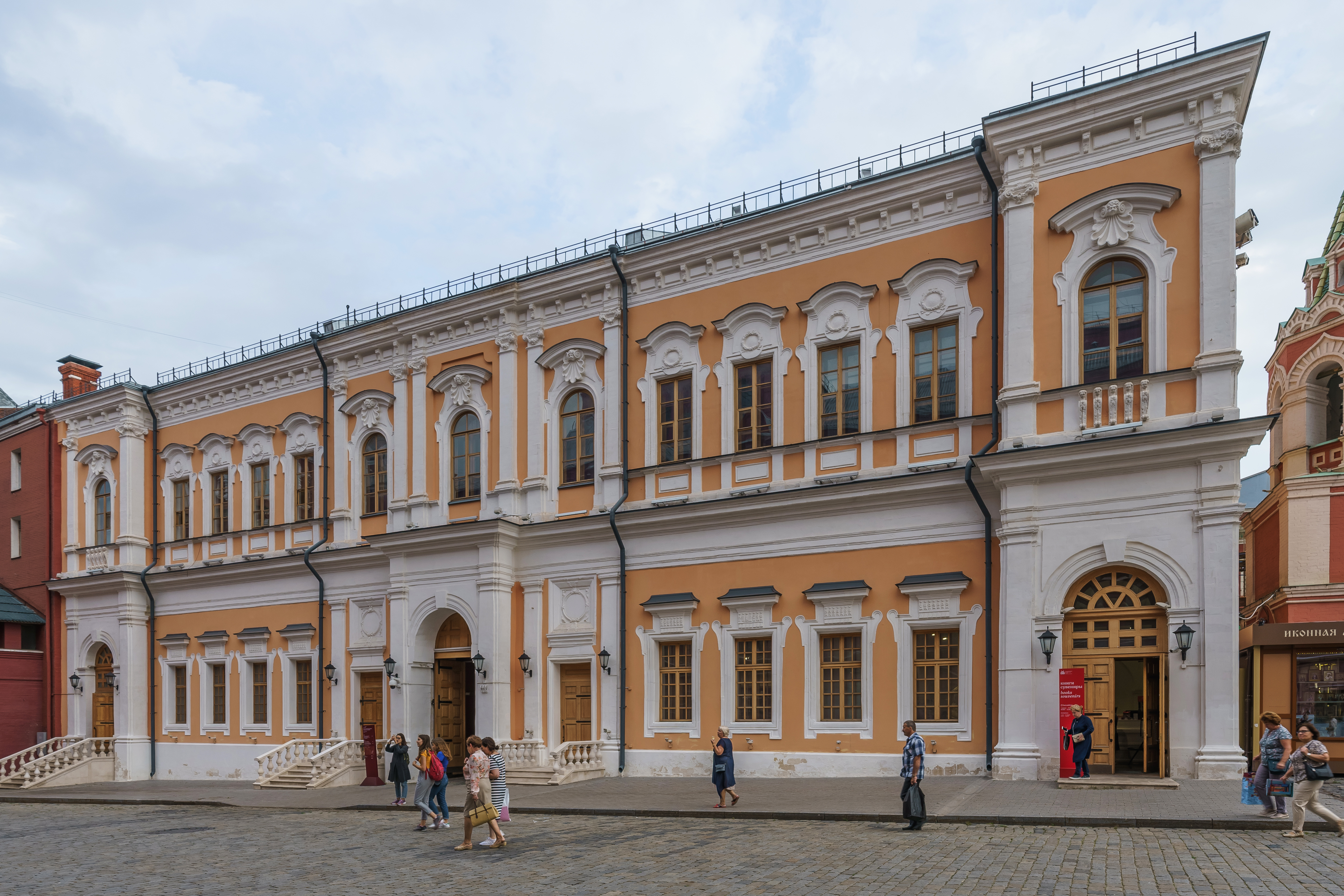
The building in 2018

The building standing between the Resurrection Gate and the Kazan Cathedral is one of the less conspicuous buildings on Red Square. It was built between 1733 and 1740 and since then has served as the headquarters of the administration of the city of Moscow and the Moscow Governorate (the latter partially corresponds to today's Moscow Oblast). The government administration building was not spared from the war against Napoleon in 1812, in which large parts of Moscow were destroyed. In the 1810s it was then rebuilt, under the direction of the architect Joseph Bové, who was instrumental in the reconstruction of the city at that time. In the course of this reconstruction, a tower was added to the roof of the house, which for a long time served as an observation tower for a fire station. At the beginning of the 20th century, however, this tower was dismantled.

In the courtyard of the former government administration building, the old building of the state mint has been preserved to this day. This was built in 1697 by decree of Peter the Great and since then has housed a production facility for silver coins for almost a quarter of a century before the money issuing system of the tsarist Empire was essentially relocated to Saint Petersburg. After the end of minting, the lower part of the building, which had no windows, was temporarily used as a Debtors' prison for insolvent merchants. Today, both the former government building and the old mint belong to the neighbouring historical museum.

=== Kazan Cathedral ===
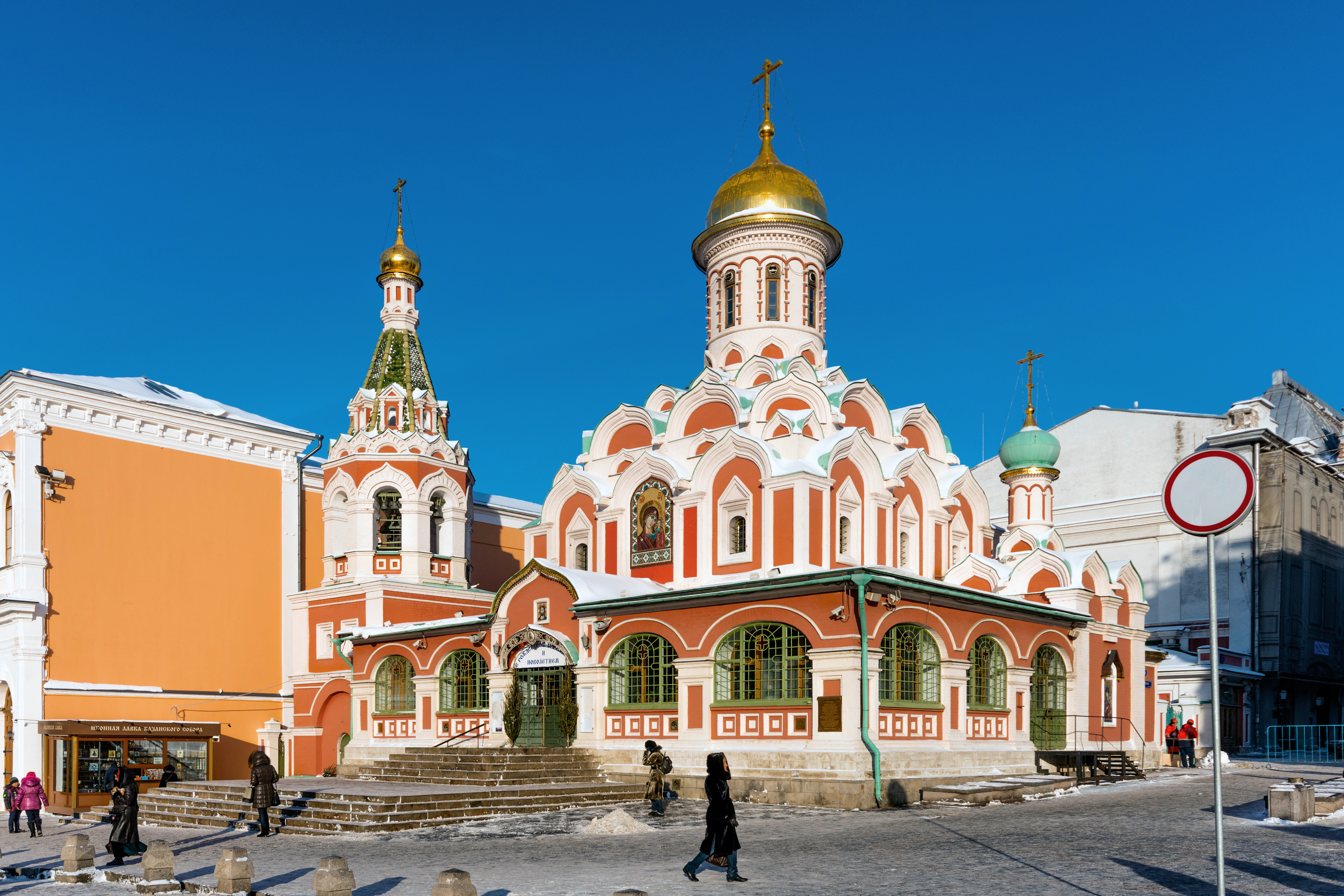
Kazan Cathedral

The Kazan Cathedral is to the right of the former government administration building, on the corner of Red Square and Nikolskaya Street. Today's cathedral is a replica from 1993; originally there was a church at this site since the 1620s, initially a wooden one, then a stone one from 1636 onwards.

The Kazan Cathedral owes its name to the icon of Our Lady of Kazan, which has been venerated by the believers of the Russian Orthodox Church for centuries. According to a legend, it was precisely this icon of the Russian People's army, led by the national heroes Kuzma Minin and Dmitri Pozharsky, who defeated the Military of the Polish–Lithuanian Commonwealth in 1612. A few years after the victory, the devout Prince Pozharsky founded the cathedral dedicated to this icon. This corresponded to the then usual Russian tradition of building churches in memory of historically important victories in Russia.

In the 17th and 18th centuries, the Kazan Cathedral on Red Square was one of the most important Moscow places of worship and was the scene of solemn cross processions led by the patriarch and the tsar, especially on the anniversary of the victory over the Polish–Lithuanian Commonwealth.

In 1936 the cathedral, like many other Moscow places of worship, was demolished at the approval of Joseph Stalin. It was not until the early 1990s that the reconstruction, which was called for by the public on several occasions, began and was completed in 1993. This made the Kazan Cathedral one of the first places of worship in Moscow to be destroyed during the Soviet era, to be rebuilt in the 1990s.

=== GUM department store ===
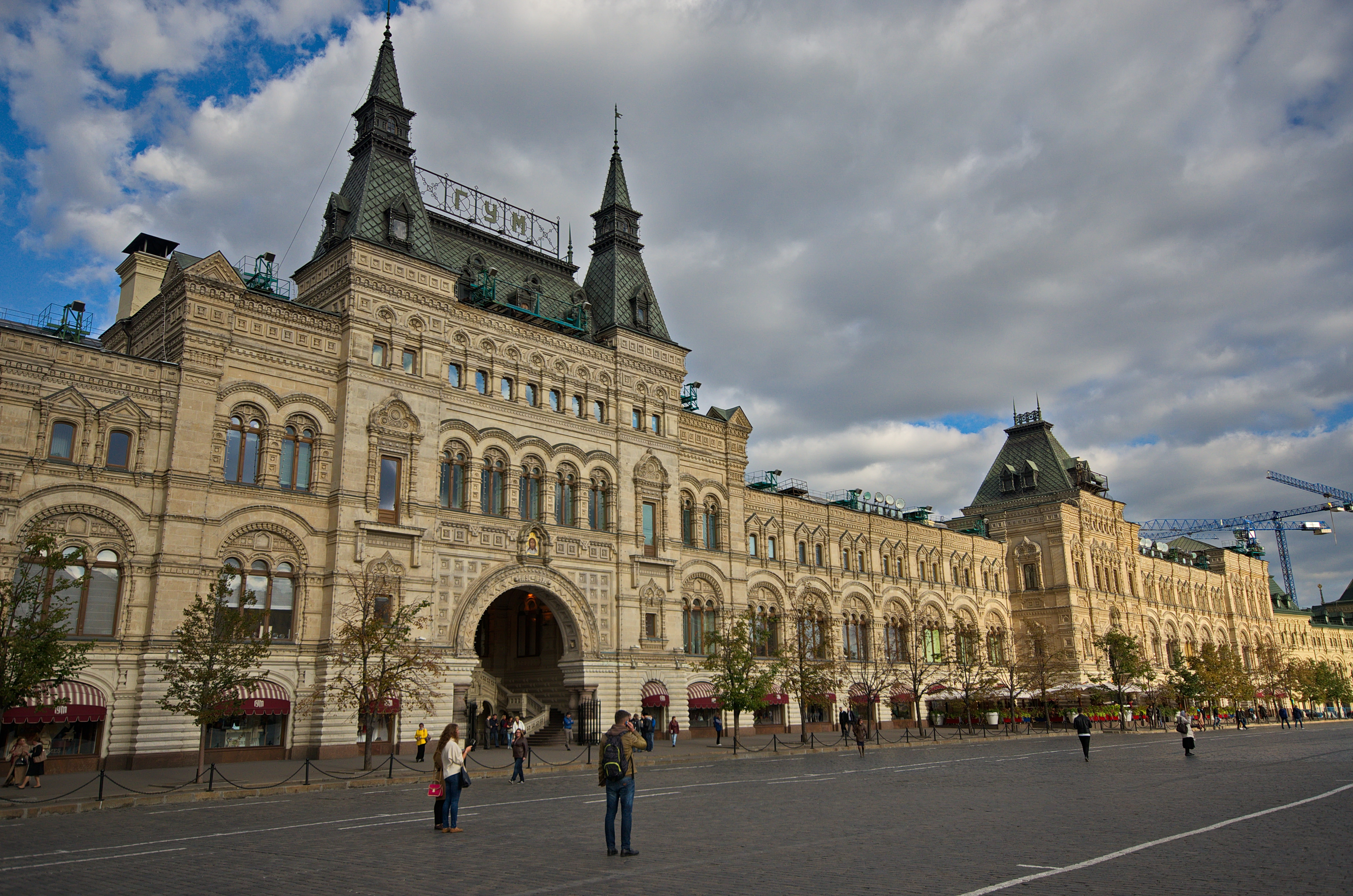
GUM

The GUM department store, situated at the eastern side of the square, occupies the entire section between Nikolskaya and Ilyinka streets. Due to its location directly on Red Square, and its considerable size, the sales area is around 35,000 square metres (380,000 sq ft). Owing to the building's striking architecture, the GUM is the best-known shopping center in Russia.

Built in 1893, it replaced an Empire style building that had housed the Upper Trading Ranks since 1815, which united a large part of Kitai-Gorod's trading activities under one roof. After this building began to deteriorate in the middle of the 19th century, there were plans for a building to replace it. However, due to organisational difficulties, these could only be implemented in the 1890s, for which a special company was founded and an ideas competition among architects was advertised. This was won by a project by the architecture professor Alexander Pomeranzewas, as well as the little-known engineer Vladimir Schuchow. The construction of the new trade rows lasted from 1890 to 1893. When they were ceremoniously opened on 2 December 1893, the new structure was able to impress the Russian and foreign public, not only with an unprecedented range of all kinds of consumer goods, but also with a completely new glass roof construction of the three passages, designed by Schuchow and built using around 60,000 panes of glass. The building's architectural style, like the neighbouring Historical Museum a decade earlier, was in the historical "Russian style" with a roof gable based on typical boyar palaces of the 16th century, two decorative towers based on the Kremlin and a main facade reminiscent of historical Russian buildings.

During the Soviet era, the new upper trading ranks had an eventful history. In 1921, they were given their current name GUM («ГУМ»), which, at the time, was the abbreviation for «Государственный Универсальный Магазин» ('State Department Store'); today it stands for «Главный Универсальный Магазин» ('Main Universal Store'). In the early 1930s, they were closed for two decades and served as office and residential buildings, and from the end of 1953, until the dissolution of the Soviet Union, the store was considered a model department store in the middle of the real socialist shortage economy. In the 1990s, the store was privatised and thoroughly renovated, and today, it presents itself to the locals and tourists as a noble shopping centre characterised by boutiques in the upper price ranges. Since 2013, GUM operates a yearly Christmas fair in front of its department store, the biggest one in all of Russia.

=== Middle Trade Rows ===
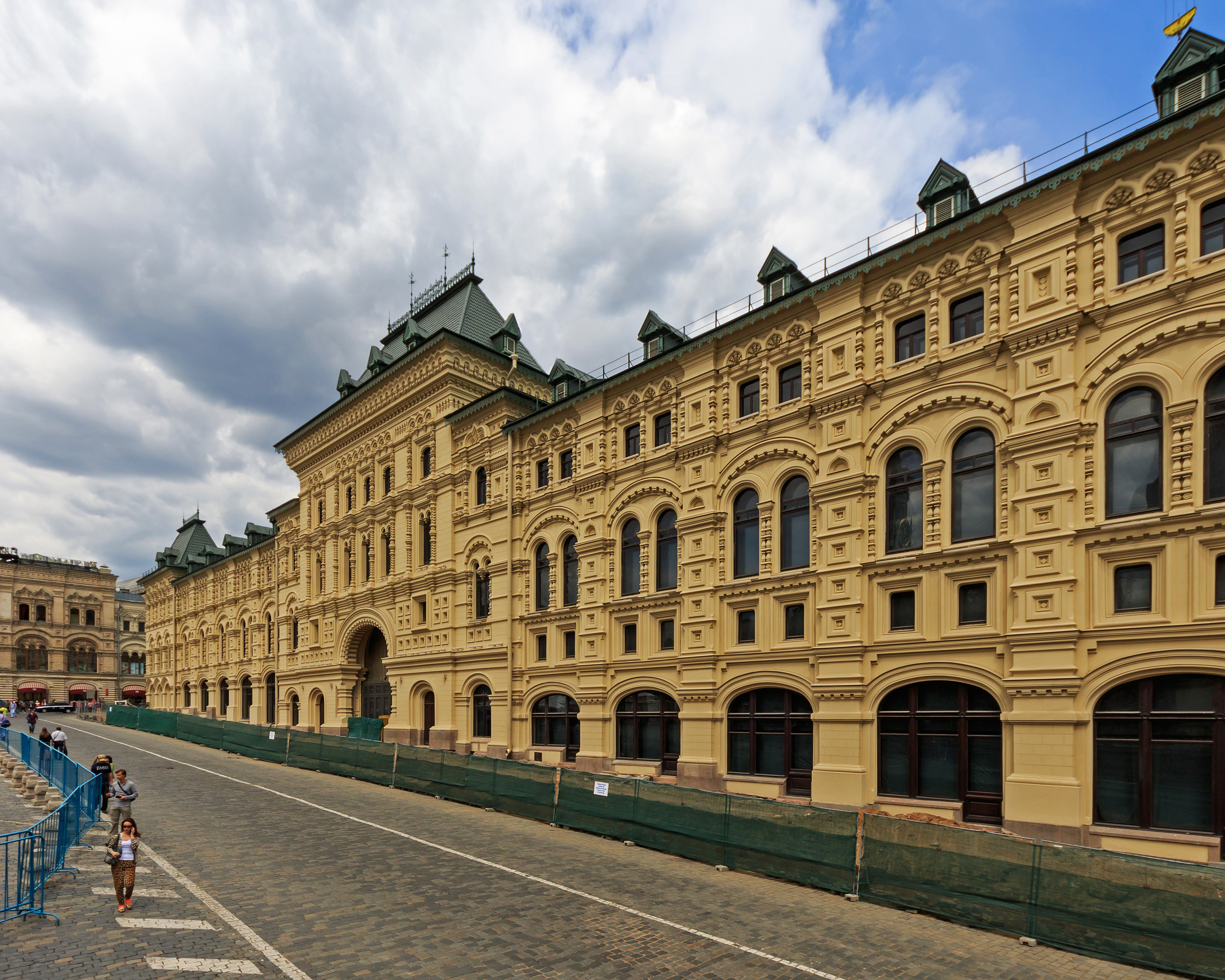
Middle Trade Rows

The building at the easternmost point of the square, on the corner of Ilyinka Street, stands exactly where the Middle Trading Rows stood in the 17th century. These formed, along with the Upper Trading Rows, where today's GUM store is located, as part of the broader market trading area that helped shape the Kitay-gorod district, adjacent to the Red Square. This massive expanse of assorted market stalls and self-made wooden huts was for the first time replaced at the end of the 18th century, by a building complex specially built for trade, whose authorship is attributed to the Italian builder Giacomo Quarenghi. In the war of 1812, however, these buildings were burned down and were replaced by the Middle Trading Rows building, rebuilt by Joseph Bové, which has been preserved to this day and is located on Ilyinka Street a few hundred meters east of Red Square.

The Middle Trade Rows was not built until 1894, as was the GUM store. Planned from the start as a supplement to the latter, the upper rows were supposed to accommodate retail trade, while the premises to their right were reserved for the wholesale trade, which is why both of the buildings look very similar architecturally. The building's architect was Roman Klein, who also designed numerous other well-known Moscow structures in the late 19th century, including the Pushkin Museum.

After the Bolsheviks came to power, the building was no longer used as a trading house, but became the headquarters of various public bodies. Until recent times, it belonged to the Russian Armed Forces. At the beginning of 2007, four inner structures of the former trading rows were demolished while plans were made to reconstruct the entire building true to the original to house an exclusive hotel. These plans came under criticism from both Russian and foreign media as circumventing the preservation order by cleverly exploiting a loophole in the law. Work is currently underway to set up a museum in the building's interior space, to designs by Meganom and Nowadays Office. The new museum is going to form a part of the UNESCO protected ensemble of Moscow Kremlin Museums, and will bring a part of the Kremlin Armoury collection outside the Kremlin walls.

=== Lobnoye Mesto ===
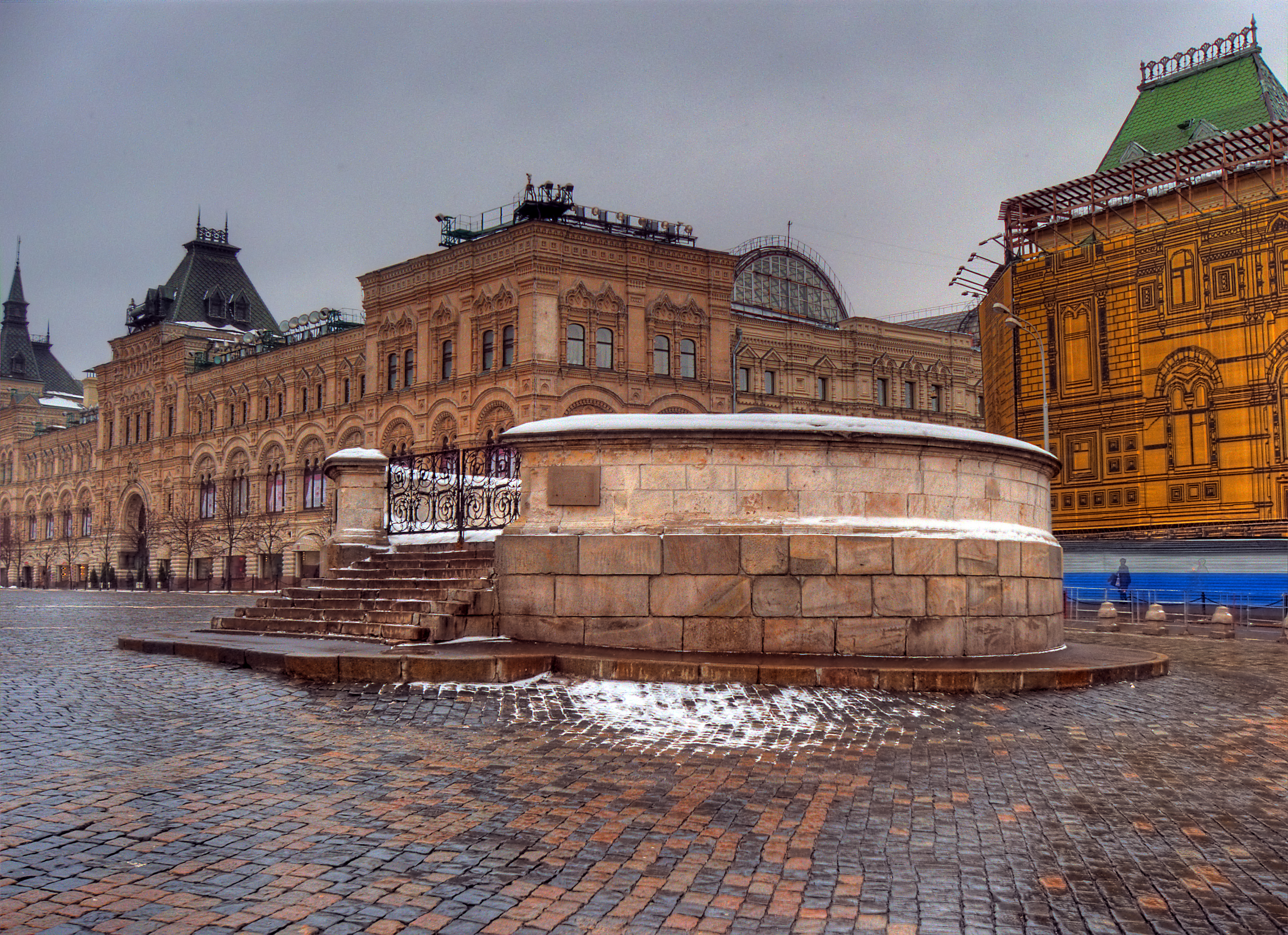
Lobnoye Mesto at the center

The Lobnoye Mesto (Russian: Лобное место) is a round, grandstand-like structure made of white stone in the southeastern part of the square, in front of Saint Basil's Cathedral. At the same time, it is one of the oldest buildings on the square that has been documented to this day. Lobnoye Mesto was first mentioned in 1549, when the then 19 year old tsar Ivan The Terrible gave a speech there. Thus, it must have been conceived from the beginning as a platform from which, above all, tsar decrees were announced to the people. The name Lobnoye Mesto could literally mean 'forehead' or 'skull' (and thus a literal translation of Golgotha), however, according to other hypotheses, it has nothing to do with a forehead, but with its location near the praise, as a steep river bank was called in medieval Russia.

According to tradition, the grandstand on Red Square was originally made of wood, and the current stone building with a gate made of iron grating dates from the late 1590s. In the course of time, the Lobnoye Mesto was not only used as a platform for state announcements and announcements, but also as the centre of solemn events; the patriarchs of the Russian Orthodox Church gave speeches to the crowd here, at solemn services on Red Square. At the same time, the Lobnoye Mesto became notorious as the scene of executions, such as the one of Stenka Rasin in 1671, and many others. Although, these executions were not carried out directly in the stand, but a few meters away.

After Saint Petersburg became Imperial Russia's capital, the Lobnoye Mesto lost its function as the tsar's tribune and has been a monument ever since. In 1786, it was rebuilt according to a design by the architect Matvey Kazakov, and moved a few meters to the east.

=== Monument to Minin and Pozharsky ===
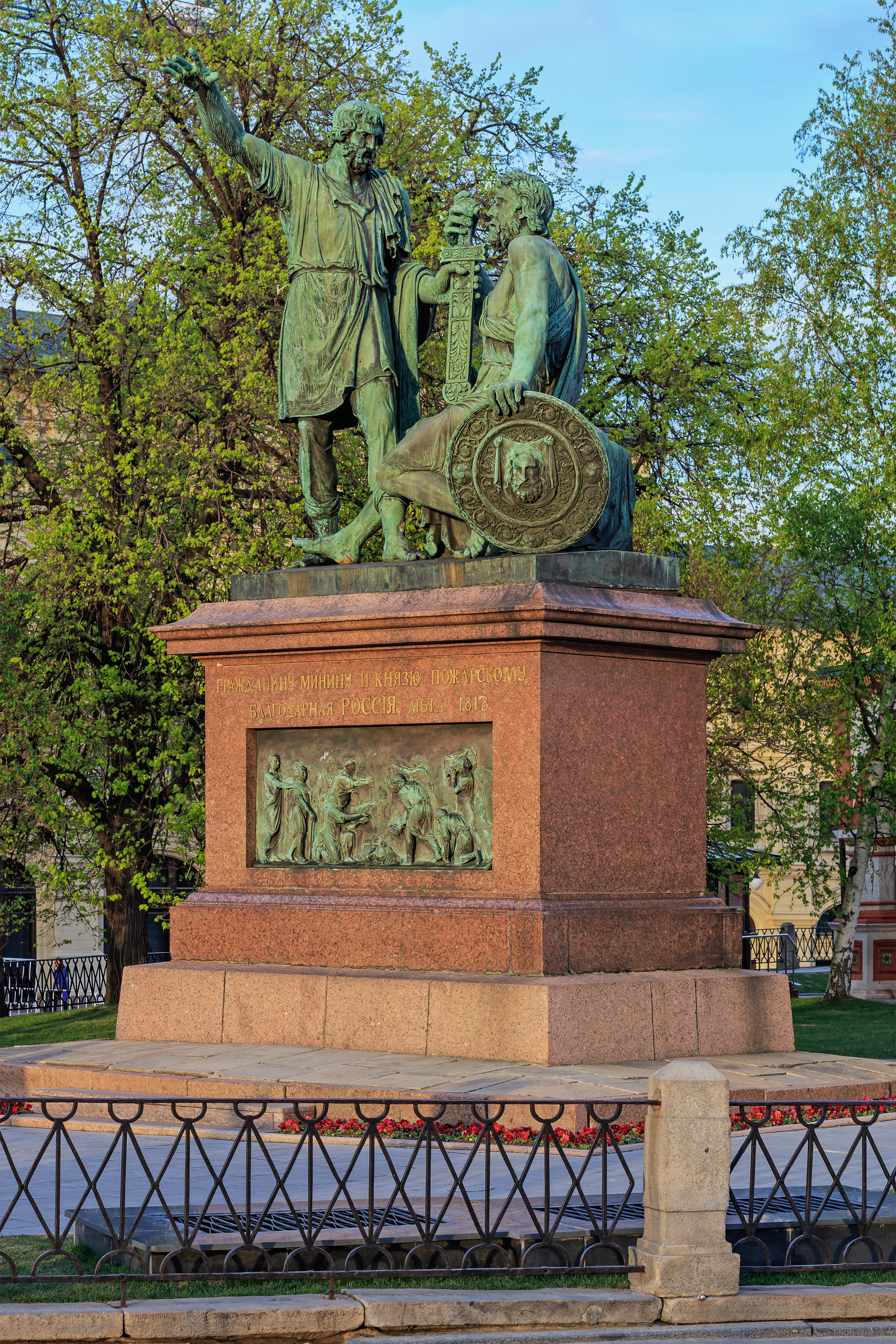
Monument to Minin and Pozharsky

The monument to the two Russian national heroes Kuzma Minin and Prince Dmitri Poszharsky, erected between 1812 and 1818, stands directly in front of Saint Basil's Cathedral. Just like the Kazan Cathedral donated by the latter at the time in the northern part of the square, this monument also commemorates the liberation of Moscow from the Polish–Lithuanian occupation troops in 1612, to which the popular army led by Minin and Poszharsky made a decisive contribution.

The bronze monument, which weighs 20 tons, and was financed entirely from donations at the time, was designed by the sculptor Ivan Martos. After almost 15 years of planning and construction, it was unveiled in a festive ceremony in February 1818. Since at the time, it had been five years since Russia successfully stopped the French invasion led by Napoleon, and the reconstruction of Moscow had just been completed, the monument was celebrated when it was erected as a symbol of the invincibility of Russia and the heroism of its sons. Originally, however, the sculpture did not stand in front of Saint Basil's Cathedral, but in front of today's GUM department store at the level of the main entrance. It was only moved to its current location in 1930, to make more space for military parades and large-scale demonstrations.

=== Saint Basil's Cathedral ===
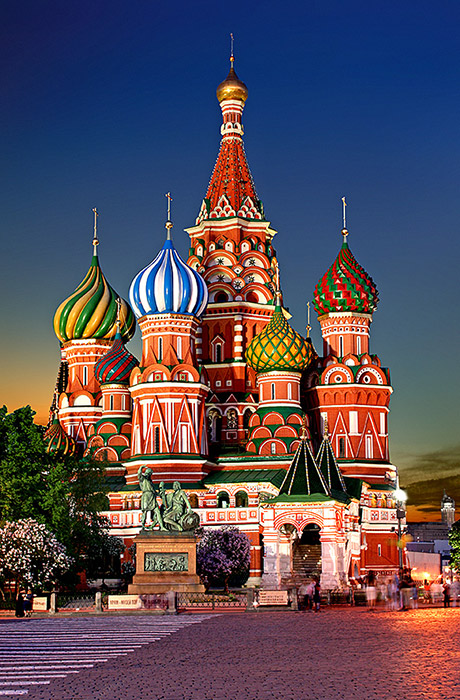
Saint Basil's Cathedral

Saint Basil's Cathedral, which delimits the square on its southern side, is undoubtedly the square's most famous building, and one of Russia's cultural icons. Once, the church was the main place of worship in Moscow, but today the cathedral mainly functions as a museum that is part of the complex of the State Historical Museum in the opposite. Since the early 1990s, services have been held in the cathedral at irregular intervals.

In the middle of the 16th century, the wooden Church of the Holy Trinity, stood exactly on the site of Saint Basil's Cathedral. In 1555, Tsar Ivan the Terrible ordered a monumental church to be built on the site, which was a token of the victory of Russia over the Khanate of Kazan three years earlier. This was according to the tradition of the time to have churches built to commemorate military victories. The wooden church was then demolished and the present cathedral was built on this site by 1561, making it one of the oldest buildings on the square. The name of the cathedral, which is still more common today, was given in memory of Basil the Blessed, who was venerated by tsar Ivan at the time, and after his death in 1522, he was buried near the cathedral. Ivan Barma and Postnik Yakovlev were among the most popular architects of the church.

From the completion of the cathedral to the relocation of Russia's capital from Moscow to Saint Petersburg, it remained the most important church in the city and the venue for solemn services on all major Orthodox festivals. In its history, the cathedral was threatened with destruction several times; legend has it that Napoleon ordered the cathedral to be blown up when he withdrew from Moscow in 1812, but a sudden downpour extinguished the fuses that had already been ignited. In 1918, after the October Revolution, the cathedral was closed by the Bolsheviks and its head was executed. At the same time, there were demolition plans for the cathedral, only the personal commitment of the architect Pyotr Baranovsky, who was commissioned to prepare the demolition against the plans ultimately prevented their implementation.

What is particularly striking about the cathedral is its asymmetrical and unique architectural style, which greatly distinguishes it from most other Russian Orthodox church buildings. The central element of the house are its nine church towers with brightly painted onion-shaped domes, some of which are very different in size and colour. The latter also has the effect that the building does not have a main facade and therefore offers the viewer an unusual view from every side. Originally built of white stone, the cathedral was decorated in places with red bricks during a renovation in the middle of the 17th century, which gives it its striking colour heterogeneity to this day. The inside of the cathedral is also very imposing with a labyrinth-like system of corridors and galleries.

=== Eastern Kremlin Wall ===
The eastern segment of the Kremlin wall, and the Red Square behind it, emerged on its present site in the 15th century, during the reign of Ivan III; the wall and the square were separated with a wide defensive moat filled with water diverted from the Neglinnaya River. The moat was lined with a secondary fortress wall, and spanned by three bridges connecting the Kremlin to the posad.

The northernmost of the three Kremlin towers is the 70 meter high Nikolskaya Tower named after Saint Nicholas, whose icon originally adorned the lower part of the tower. The tower is one of the four towers of the Moscow Kremlin today that have an entrance gate to the Kremlin. It was originally built in 1491, to a design by the master builder Pietro Antonio Solari, who as one of several Italian architects who were active in Moscow at the time, playing a key role in the construction of the Kremlin ensemble. In 1806, Nikolskaya Tower was significantly redesigned and under Gothic architectural style, which was completely unusual for the Kremlin. Only a few years later, it was destroyed by the troops of Napoleon, and was finally rebuilt in 1816 with the participation of Joseph Bové. Owning its Gothic style, Nikolskaya Tower is still the most unusual of the twenty Kremlin towers.

The Spasskaya Tower, is the main tower of the eastern wall of the Kremlin, and is arguably the most famous tower of all of Kremlin. It also has an entrance gate, which closes Red Square together with the neighboring Saint Basil's Cathedral from the south. Owing its name to an image of the Savior that once hung over the gate, the tower rises over 71 meters, and like Nikolskaya Tower, was also built by Pietro Antonio Solari in 1491. However, it was then about half as high as it is today. The tower has roughly the current shape since a reconstruction in the years 1624–1625, when it was supplemented by a bell tower with a large tower clock designed by Christopher Galloway, which today, is the most famous architectural element of the tower. The clock's four dials, one on each side of the tower, date up to 1852, and each of them has a diameter of 6.12 meters. The high-precision clockwork occupies three floors of the tower, and a dozen bells below the top of the tower ring every quarter of an hour.

Both the Nikolskaya and the Spasskaya Tower are crowned by a three-meter-wide red star made of three-layer ruby and agate glass. These stars, were symbols of Communism, and were placed on a total of five Kremlin towers in 1937, which were previously adorned with the Imperial Russian double-headed eagle.

The small tower at the level of Lenin's Mausoleum between the Nikolskaya and the Spasskaya Tower is the Senatskaya Tower. It was built in 1491, also by Pietro Antonio Solari, and was purely defensive in nature: it guarded the Kremlin on the Red Square side. For a long time it remained nameless. It was only in 1787, after architect Matvei Kazakov constructed the Kremlin Senate on the Kremlin's territory, that it was given its present name. The dome of the Senate can be seen from Red Square. Inside the central part of the tower there are three tiers of vaulted chambers. In 1860, the flat tower was topped with a stone tent roof crowned, in turn, with a gilt weather vane. The tower contains a through-passage that allows VIPs to travel from the kremlin to Red Square. Its height is 34.3 metres (113 ft).

=== Lenin Mausoleum ===
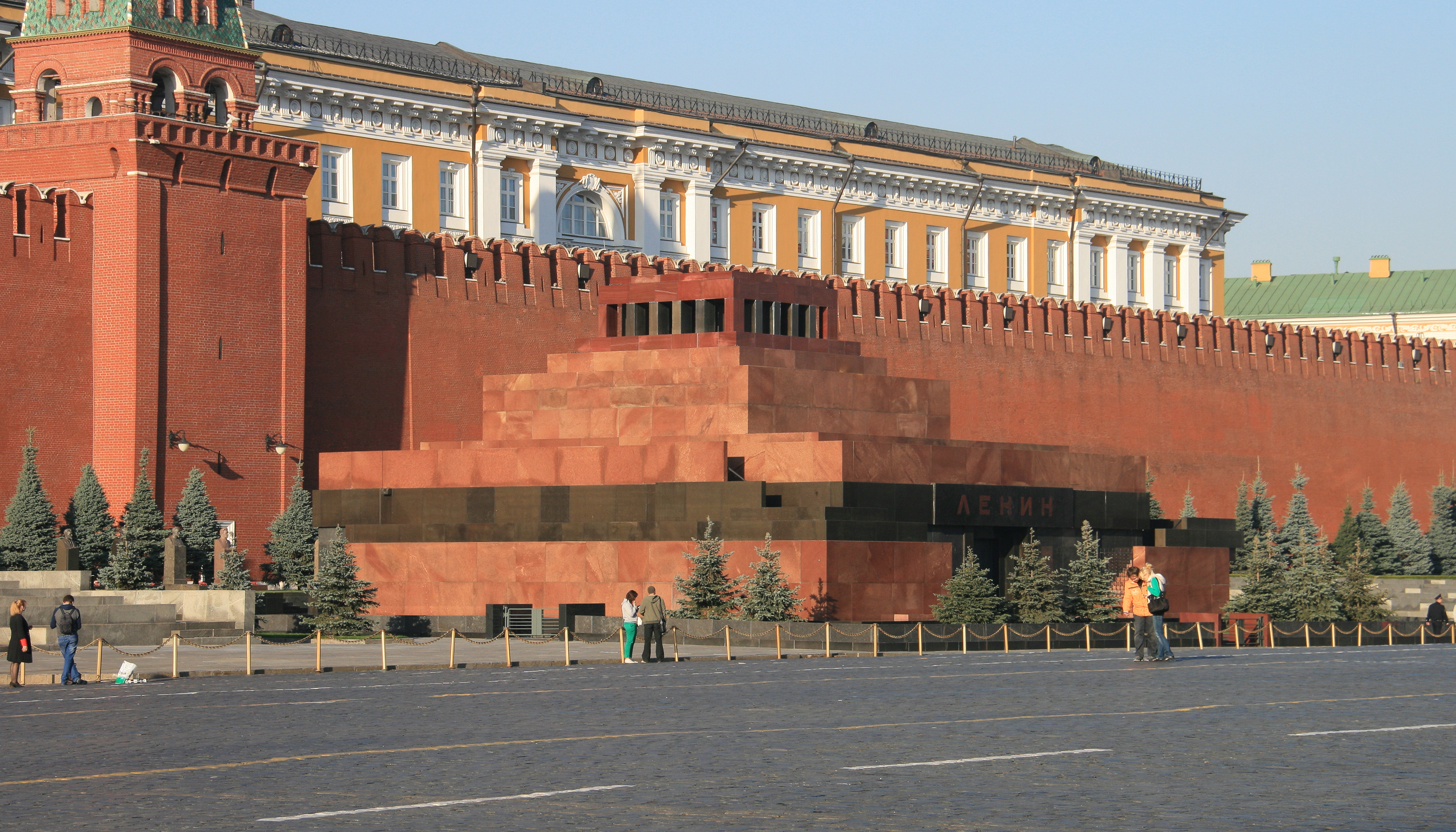
Lenin's Mausoleum, as seen in front of the Kremlin

An important monument of the Soviet era is the Lenin Mausoleum, which is located in the western side of the square. It stands by the Kremlin wall at the height of the Senate Tower, almost exactly where the protective moat ran until the 18th century, and a tram line ran from 1909 to 1930. Inside the mausoleum, the lavishly embalmed corpse of Vladimir Lenin rests in an armoured glass sarcophagus. To this day, the mausoleum is open to visitors on certain days.

Today's building made of granite and labradorite, was preceded by two provisional mausoleums made of oak. The first of these was erected in January 1924, a few days after Lenin's death, and had a simple cube shape at a height of three meters, a second temporary arrangement was set up in the spring of 1924. The current building was erected between 1929 and 1930. From the outside, it has the shape of a multi-tiered pyramid, which should underline the character of the mausoleum as a monumental burial place based on ancient models. The author of the design was the renowned architect Alexey Shchusev, who also had the two previous mausoleums built.

From the completion of the mausoleum, and until the end of the Soviet Union, the mausoleum was considered a central attraction, and a place of worship in the socialist world. During the military parades and marches on Red Square, heads of state appeared from the central stand on the roof of the mausoleum until the mid-1990s. In 1953, the body of the deceased Lenin's successor Joseph Stalin was embalmed and laid out in the mausoleum. Eight years later, however, he was removed from the mausoleum in the course of the so-called de-Stalinization, which began after the 20th Congress of the CPSU, and buried at the Kremlin wall.

Today the mausoleum still attracts numerous tourists, although mostly no longer motivated by the personality cult surrounding the revolutionary leader. Notwithstanding this, the further laying out of Lenin's remains in the mausoleum is controversial. Many celebrities, including the last Soviet head of state, Mikhail Gorbachev, spoke out in favour of Lenin's burial.

=== Kremlin Wall Necropolis ===
Right behind Lenin's Mausoleum, along the walls of the Kremlin, there is a large cemetery of honour. This was created in November 1917, when around 250 soldiers had fallen during the October Revolution in Moscow. They found their final resting place in two collective graves near the Senate tower. The tradition of burying revolutionaries on Red Square, the ultimate symbol of the Bolshevik Revolution, continued immediately: as early as the spring of 1919, Lenin's leading comrade Yakov Sverdlov was buried on the Kremlin wall and received with Lenin's Mausoleum, which was completed in 1930 the burial place is its central element. Since then, the mausoleum and the surrounding cemetery have been collectively referred to as the Revolutionary Necropolis.

From the 1920s to the 1980s, hundreds of people were buried in Red Square who were considered to be the most deserving sons and daughters of the Soviet Union, that is, revolutionaries, heroes of the Soviet Union, statesmen and military leaders of the highest order. The burial in the Kremlin wall necropolis was in fact considered the highest posthumous honour that was reserved for only a few. A total of twelve statesmen; including Sverdlov, Mikhail Kalinin, Kliment Voroshilov, Leonid Brezhnev and Stalin, who was laid out in the mausoleum until 1961, were buried in individual graves, and a large number of the revolutionaries rest here in a total of 15 collective graves. Most of the burials here, however, are niches in the Kremlin wall, in which over 100 urns with the remains of revolutionaries, heroes or main ideologues are walled. The people whose urns are in the Kremlin wall include, among others, Lenin's companion Nadezhda Krupskaya, the first cosmonaut Yuri Gagarin, the revolutionary writer Maxim Gorky, the nuclear weapon developer Igor Kurchatov, but also foreign politicians Clara Zetkin and Fritz Heckert.

The necropolis on the Kremlin wall has been a memorial since 1974. After the 1985 funeral of the head of state Konstantin Chernenko, there have been no further burials. The tombs of the necropolis can now be visited at the same time as the mausoleum.

== Sport events ==
The Russian Bandy Federation in cooperation with the Moscow Patriarchate annually organise the Patriarch's Cup, in which not only normal tournaments are held, but also for bandy in boots.

== See also ==
- Alexander Garden
- List of Moscow Kremlin towers
- Moscow Kremlin Wall
- Kremlin Wall Necropolis
- Lubyanka Square
- Saint Basil's Cathedral

== Sources ==
- Юрий Федосюк. Москва в кольце Садовых. М., Московский рабочий, 1991. ISBN 5-239-01139-7
- П.В.Сытин. Из истории московских улиц (очерки). М.. Московский рабочий, 1958
