= Anwarul =

Anwarul is a given name. Notable people with the name include:

- Kazi Anwarul Haque (1909–2001), Bangladeshi police officer, bureaucrat, and technocrat minister
- Sheikh Anwarul Haq (1917–1995), Pakistani jurist and an academic, Chief Justice of Pakistan 1977–1981
- M Anwarul Azim (1931–1971), Bengali industrial administrator, killed in the Bangladesh Liberation war
- Anwarul Karim Chowdhury (born 1943), Bangladeshi diplomat noted for work on development in the poorest nations, global peace and the rights of women and children
- Shamsul Anwarul Huq (born 1944), Rohingya academic, pro-democracy activist and former politician in Myanmar
- Anwarul Iqbal (1950–2015), adviser of 2007–2009 interim Caretaker Government of Bangladesh
- Anwarul Haque (1956–2017), Bangladesh Supreme Court justice, Chairman of International Crimes Tribunal-1
- Anwarul Momen, two star rank Bangladesh Army officer and GOC of 17th Infantry Division
- Anwarul Kabir Talukdar, former politician of Bangladesh Nationalist Party politician and Liberal Democratic Party
- Anwarul Amin Azhar, former Bangladeshi cricketer
- Anwarul Azim (politician), Bangladesh Nationalist Party politician, former Member of Parliament

== See also ==
- Anwarul Islam Women's Arabic College Mongam, University of Calicut, Kerala
- Anwar (disambiguation)
