= Pyotr Baranovsky =

Pyotr Dmitrievich Baranovsky
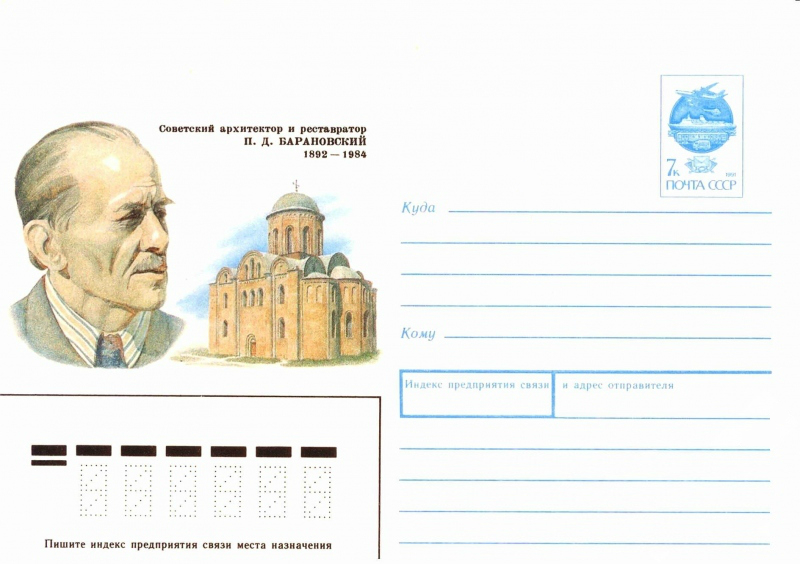
- Born: February 26, 1892; Shuyskoye, Vyazemsky Uyezd, Smolensk Governorate, Russian Empire
- Died: June 12, 1984 (aged 92); Moscow, Russian SFSR, Soviet Union
- Occupation: Architect
- Buildings: Restoration of Krutitsy and St. Andronik Monastery
- Projects: Kolomenskoye and Andrei Rublev museums

Pyotr Dmitrievich Baranovsky (Russian: Пётр Дми́триевич Барано́вский; February 26, 1892 – June 12, 1984) was a Russian architect, preservationist and restorator who reconstructed many ancient buildings in the Soviet Union. He is credited with saving Saint Basil's Cathedral from destruction in the early 1930s, founding and managing the Kolomenskoye and Andrei Rublev museums, and developing modern restoration technologies.

== Education and early career ==
Petr Baranovsky was born in a peasant family in Shuyskoye, in the Vyazemsky Uyezd of the Smolensk Governorate of the Russian Empire, and completed a construction engineer's degree in Moscow in 1912, earning the medal of Russian Archeological Society for restoration of Boldino Trinity Monastery in his native Smolensk region. After a brief work on industrial and railway projects, with the outbreak of World War I, he was drafted into military engineers' corps. In 1918, he completed a second degree, in art studies, and joined the faculty of Moscow State University.

In 1921, Baranovsky settled for the first of his ten expeditions to the Russian North. In the course of his life he surveyed and recorded hundreds of architectural landmarks ranging from White Sea to Ukraine and Azerbaijan. In late 1920s, in the middle of anti-religious campaigns, he restored Saint Basil's Cathedral in Red Square, clearing the medieval landmark from alterations of later centuries.

== Kolomenskoye ==
In 1924, Baranovsky persuaded the authorities to declare Kolomenskoye park a museum area, and became its first manager. From 1927 to 1934, he acquired and preserved wooden architecture from the Russian countryside, notably the House of Peter I which he brought from Arkhangelsk, the fortress tower of Sumskoy Ostrog on the White Sea, the Honey-Mead Brewery from Preobrazhenskoye, and others. Baranovsky personally surveyed, recorded and restored the local architecture of Kolomenskoye. In one case, he carefully demolished 19th-century alterations to the Church of Saint George in order to open access to the 16th century belltower. Today, the tower and refectory still stand separately.

== Boldino museum and persecution ==
The only way to defend religious buildings in Soviet Russia was to convert them into museums. In 1923, Baranovsky succeeded in declaring Boldinsky Monastery a branch of Dorogobuzh Museum. He and two local museum managers collected relics from other temples that were looted by Bolsheviks, and preserved the collection of Yelnya museum that was closed in 1926. Baranovsky realized the uncertainty of his museum, and hired photographer Mikhail Pogodin, grandson of Mikhail Pogodin, to document Boldino and its exhibits (1928–1929). Baranovsky-Pogodin archives present a particular branch of Orthodox art of Upper Dnieper, the boundary between Orthodox and Catholic worlds. (Note: This section is based on materials of 2002 Baranovsky exhibition at the Moscow Museum of Architecture, collected by Maria Rogozina and Ulyana Chornovil)

In November 1929, authorities shut down the museum; its treasures are presumed lost, as is most of Pogodin's photography. In January 1930, they arrested Semyon Buzanov, the museum manager, who died in prison. Nikolai Savin, manager of Dorogobuzh museum, chose to flee his hometown; Pogodin lost his job as a "social alien". Baranovsky himself received a formal reprimand in 1931 but was arrested later, in 1934, accused of Anti-Soviet propaganda, and sentenced to an exile in Mariinsk, where he earned a "Siberian Camp Udarnik" badge.

== See also ==
- Donskoy Monastery in Moscow
- Sobir Odilov
