= Sobir Odilov =

Uzbek architect

- Born: Sobir Rahimovich Odilov; March 1, 1932; Tashkent, Uzbek SSR, USSR
- Died: December 18, 2017 (aged 85); Tashkent, Uzbekistan
- Occupation: architecture
- Notable work: The Palace of Friendship of Peoples was named after V.I. Lenin (1977); The Building of the Supreme Council of the Uzbek SSR (1979); Architectural aspects of the monuments to V.I. Lenin in the central square of Tashkent (1974).; Monument to Yuri Gagarin in Tashkent (1979).

Sobir Rahimovich Odilov (Uzbek: Одилов Собир Раҳимович born March 1, 1932, Tashkent – July 18, 2002, Tashkent) was an Uzbek and Soviet architect. He was awarded the title of People's Architect of the USSR in 1981 and served as the Chief Architect of Tashkent from 1970 to 1986. He was also a laureate of the State Prize of the USSR in 1975.

== Biography ==
He was born on 1 March in Tashkent,1932. After graduating from the architectural department of the Central Asian Polytechnic Institute (now Tashkent State Technical University) in 1955, he worked as the Chief Architect of Almalyk (1955–1961) and the Tashkent Region of Uzbekistan (1962–1966). Later, he served as the Chief Architect of Tashkent (1970–1984, 1990–1991).

He also held the position of Deputy Chairman of the Committee for Construction of the Uzbek SSR (1975–1985, 1990–1991) headed the department (1986), and later served as the director (1989) of the Uzbek Scientific Research and Design Institute for the Restoration of Cultural Monuments.

He was the author and co-author of projects for the development of the city centers of Tashkent, Andijan, and Jizzakh (1970, 1980), as well as more than 80 projects related to urban residential development and monuments in Uzbekistan. Notable projects included:

- The Palace of Friendship of Peoples was named after V.I. Lenin (1977)
- The Building of the Supreme Council of the Uzbek SSR (1979)
- Architectural aspects of the monuments to V.I. Lenin in the central square of Tashkent(Mustaqillik Maydoni) (1974).
- Monument to Yuri Gagarin in Tashkent (1979).

He also led the teams of architects responsible for the design of all stations of the Tashkent Metro. Odilov made significant contributions to the development of architectural and monumental art and the resolution of complex urban planning challenges in Uzbekistan.

He died on July 18, 2002, in Tashkent.

== Awards ==
- "Заслуженный строитель Узбекской ССР" ("Distinguished Builder of the Uzbek SSR") (1967)
- People's Architect of the USSR (1981)
- State Prize of the USSR (1975) - for the architectural and planning solution of the center of Tashkent
- Order of Friendship of Peoples

== See also ==
- Sergo Sutyagin
- Zarema Nagayeva
- Anvar Kurbanov
