= Anvar Bikzhanov =

Russian football coach

Personal information
- Full name: Anvar Karimovich Bikzhanov
- Date of birth: 21 April 1950 (age 76)
- Place of birth: Chelkar

Managerial career
- Years: Team
- 1991: FC Torpedo Armavir (team director)
- 1997: FC Lada-Togliatti-VAZ Togliatti (assistant)
- 1997: FC Lada-Togliatti-VAZ Togliatti
- 1997–1998: FC Lada-Togliatti-VAZ Togliatti (assistant)
- 2003: FC Lada Togliatti (assistant)
- 2004: FC Chernomorets Novorossiysk (assistant)
- 2004: FC Chernomorets Novorossiysk

Anvar Karimovich Bikzhanov (Russian: Анвар Каримович Бикжанов; born 21 April 1950) is a Russian football coach.

== Professional career ==
Bikzhanov has managed FC Lada-Togliatti-VAZ Togliatti and FC Chernomorets Novorossiysk in the Russian First Division.
