= Khvajeh Anvar =

Khvajeh Anvar خواجه انور
- Village
- Location within Iran
- Coordinates: 31°54′05″N 50°14′20″E
- Country: Iran
- Province: Khuzestan
- County: Izeh
- Bakhsh: Dehdez
- Rural District: Donbaleh Rud-e Shomali

Population (2006)
  - Total: 148
- Time zone: UTC+3:30 (IRST)
  - Summer (DST): UTC+4:30 (IRDT)

Khvajeh Anvar (Persian: خواجه انور, also Romanized as Khvājeh Anvar; also known as Khājawar, Khajeh Anvar, and Khvājehvar) is a village in Donbaleh Rud-e Shomali Rural District, Dehdez District, Izeh County, Khuzestan Province, Iran. At the 2006 census, its population was 148, in 22 families.
