= Anvar-qori Tursunov =

Anvar-qori Tursunov (Uzbek: Анвар қори Турсунов; Russian: Анвар-кори Турсунов; born 21 November 1958 – 13 June 2018) was a prominent imam-khatib at the Kukeldash mosque in Tashkent, Uzbekistan. He was stabbed several times on 31 July 2009, but recovered.

== Activities ==
Tursunov fought actively against "extremist" Islamic activity in Uzbekistan, and often served as a witness for the prosecution in trials for suspected members of outlawed Islamic groups such as Hizb-ut-Tahrir and the Islamic Movement of Uzbekistan.

He had called for Uzbek Muslims to resist "foreign influences", such as wearing the hijab. He espoused many of his views on his television program Hidoyat Sari (Towards Guidance). He has been mentioned as a possible successor to the post of Chief Mufti of Uzbekistan, the head of the Muslim Board of Uzbekistan.

== Stabbing ==
At 10:30pm on 31 July 2009, Tursunov was at his home in the Yangi-Abad district when there was a knock on his door. His son answered the door, and was told his father was being invited to a religious function. When Tursunov came to the door, he was stabbed eight times by three men - five times in the arm, and three times in the stomach. The attackers then fled the scene.

The government of Uzbekistan claims one of the attackers is Shavkat Makhmudov, a supposed member of the Islamic Movement of Uzbekistan who was reportedly killed during a shoot-out in Tashkent on 29 August 2009.

== See also ==
- Islam in Uzbekistan
