= Anvari (surname) =

Anvari (Persian: انورى) is an Iranian surname that may refer to:

- Abbas Anvari (1944–2025), Iranian physicist and chancellor of Sharif University of Technology
- Abolfazl Anvari (1938–2018), Iranian freestyle wrestler, competed in 1968 Summer Olympics
- Babak Anvari (born 1982 or 1983), British-Iranian filmmaker
- Hossein Ali Anvari, Iranian electrical engineer
- Kiarash Anvari (born 1977), Iranian filmmaker, video artist and script writer
