= Anvar Zakhidov =

Uzbek-American physicist

Anvar Abdulakhadovich Zakhidov (Russian: Анвар Абдулахадович Захидов, Uzbek: Anvar Abdulahadovich Zohidov; born 2 May 1953) is an Uzbek-American physicist from the University of Texas at Dallas.

== Career ==
Born on 2 May 1953 in Tashkent, he worked on superconductors in Japan for five years before immigrating to the United States in 1997, where he joined Honeywell in the private sector. He was installed for his pioneering contributions to the design, fabrication, characterization, and understanding of advanced functional nanomaterials and associated devices, including carbon nanotubes; superconducting and magnetic fullerenes; photonic crystals; solar cells; OLEDs; and cold field emission cathodes.

== Awards and recognition ==
He was awarded the status of Fellow in the American Physical Society after he was nominated by the Division of Materials Physics in 2009.

== See also ==
- List of fellows of the American Physical Society (2011–present)
