= Anwar =

Anwar or Al Anwar may refer to:

- Anwar (name), a given name and surname (including a list of people and characters with the name)
- Anwar (singer) (born 1949), Indian playback singer
- Anwar (2007 film), a Hindi film
- Anwar (2010 film), a Malayalam film
- MV Anwar, a coaster originally named Empire Cape
- Anwar Kidwai, fictional professor in the 2012 Indian film Ek Tha Tiger, portrayed by Roshan Seth

== Al Anwar ==
- Al Anwar (Lebanese newspaper), an Arabic daily
- Al Anwar, short for Kitab al-anwar wal-maraqib by Jacob Qirqisani c.728 CE
- Al Anwar, Al-Hakim Mosque in Cairo
- Al Anwar, Grand Anwar Mosque in Addis Ababa

== See also ==
- Annavaram (disambiguation)
- Anwar al Farkadain (Eta Ursae Minoris), a star
- Anwarul, a given name
- ANWR, a wildlife refuge in Alaska
- Anvar, a name
