= Anvar Kurbanov =

Uzbek builder, craftsman, and brigade leader

Kurbanov Anvar
- Born: 1948 (age 77–78); Sirdaryo Region, Uzbek SSR, USSR
- Occupation: master builder
- Awards: Oʻzbekiston Qahramoni(Hero of Uzbekistan)

Anvar Kurbanov (Uzbek: Qurbonov Anvar Sarmanovich; born 1948) is an Uzbek builder, craftsman, and brigade leader of the Mobile Mechanized Column No. 49 of the "Sir daryojamqurilish" State Enterprise in the Sirdaryo Region. In 1998, he was awarded the title of Hero of Uzbekistan.

== Biography ==
Anvar Kurbanov was born in 1948 in the Guliston District of the Uzbek Soviet Socialist Republic. In 1969, he began his work as a mason in the construction company No. 60 in the Guliston District. Since 1975, he has been working as a construction master in the third mechanized column of the same district. From 1981 to 1998, he held the position of brigade chief of the mechanized column No. 49 at "Sir Daryo Jamqurilish." In 1998, he was appointed brigade chief of the SMU No. 4 in the Guliston District. In 2000, he was elected chairman of the trade union of this organization.

Anvar Kurbanov actively participated in the construction of many major architectural structures, such as the 5th district of Gulistan, the Center for Spirituality and Enlightenment, a swimming pool, the sports complex "Alpomish," the Boxing Palace, and the regional branch of the Central Bank of the Russian Federation.

== Awards ==
- Oʻzbekiston Qahramoni (Hero of Uzbekistan) (1998)
