= Takayoshi (crater) =

Crater on Mercury

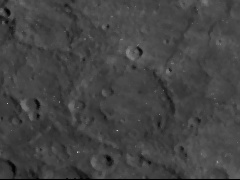
- Mariner 10 image
- Planet: Mercury
- Coordinates: 37.23°S 163.82°W
- Quadrangle: Michelangelo
- Diameter: 136 km
- Eponym: Takayoshi

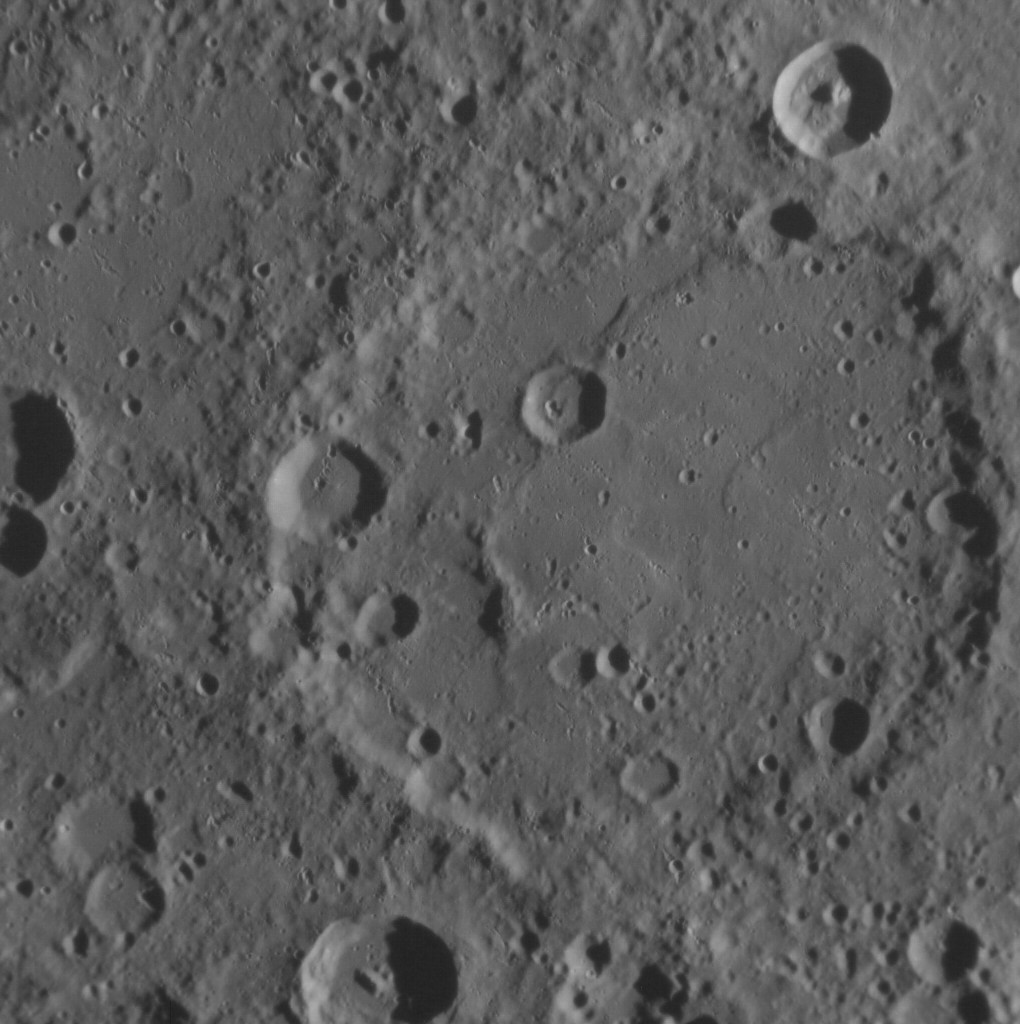
MESSENGER image

Takayoshi is an impact crater on Mercury. Its name was adopted by the IAU in 1979.

Takayoshi is north of Barma crater.
