= Saint Basil's Cathedral =

1561 Orthodox church in Moscow, Russia

Cathedral of the Intercession of Most Holy Theotokos on the Moat
- Собор Покрова Пресвятой Богородицы, что на Рву (Russian)
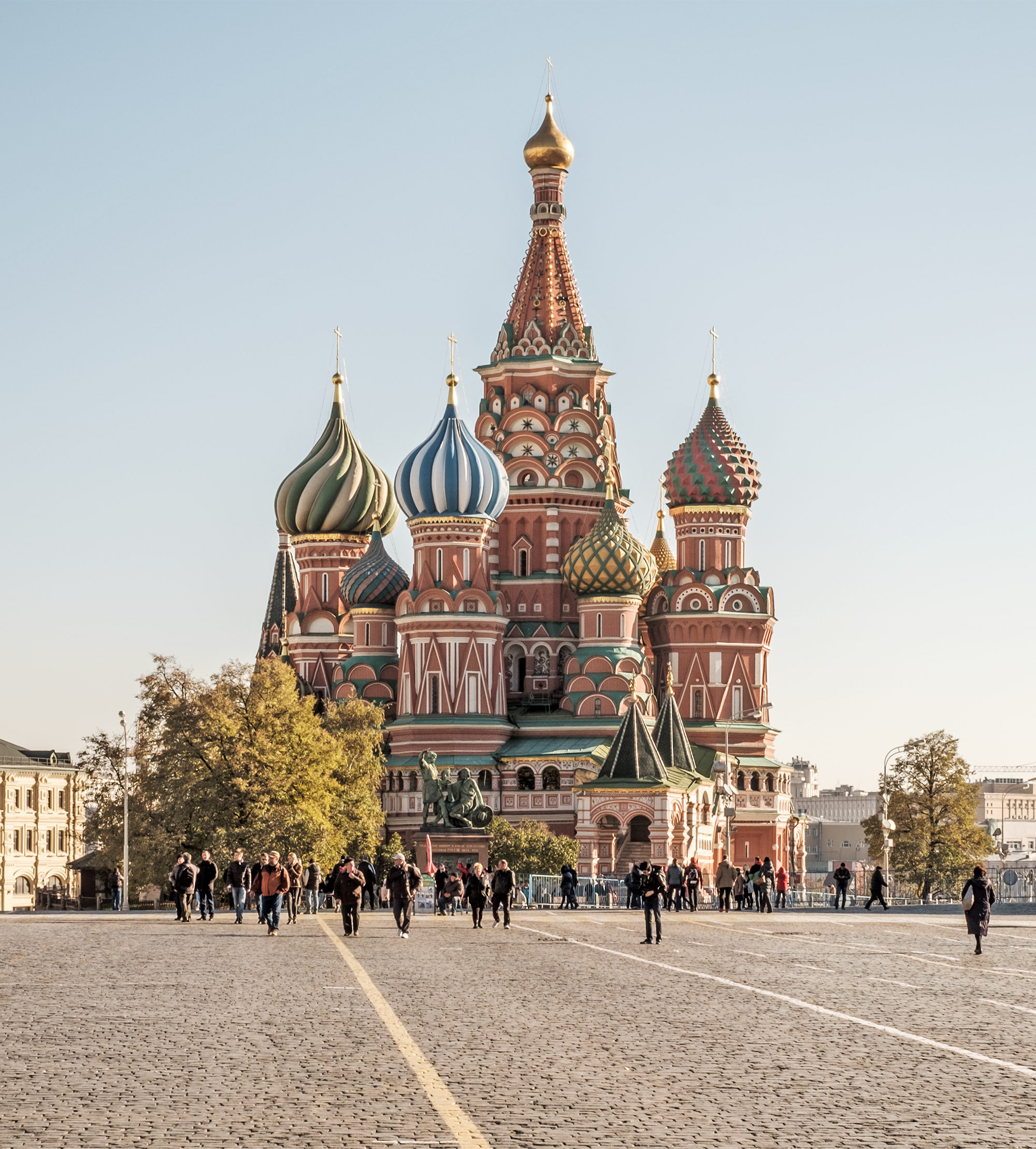
- Saint Basil's Cathedral as viewed from Red Square

- Location within Central Moscow

Religion
- Affiliation: Russian Orthodox Church
- Ecclesiastical or organisational status: State Historical Museum with church services restored since 1991
- Year consecrated: 12 July 1561; 465 years ago
- Status: Active

Location
- Location: Red Square, Moscow, Russia
- Coordinates: 55°45′9″N 37°37′23″E

Architecture
- Architects: Ivan Barma and Postnik Yakovlev
- Type: Church
- Style: Disputed (see #Architectural style)
- Groundbreaking: 1555

Specifications
- Height (max): 47.5 metres (156 ft)
- Dome: 10
- Spire: 2
- Materials

UNESCO World Heritage Site
- Type: Cultural
- Criteria: i, ii, iv, vi
- Designated: 1990 (14th session)
- Part of: Kremlin and Red Square, Moscow
- Reference no.: 545
- Region: Europe

Website
- en.shm.ru

The Cathedral of Vasily the Blessed (Russian: Собор Василия Блаженного, romanized: Sobor Vasiliya Blazhennogo), commonly known as Saint Basil's Cathedral, is a Russian Orthodox church on Red Square in the historic centre of Moscow. It is one of the most popular cultural symbols of Russia. The building, now a museum, is officially known as the Cathedral of the Intercession of the Most Holy Theotokos on the Moat, or Pokrovsky Cathedral. It was built from 1555 to 1561 on orders from Ivan the Terrible and commemorates the capture of Kazan and Astrakhan. It was completed, with its colours, in 1683.

The original building, known as Trinity Church and later Trinity Cathedral, contained eight chapels arranged around a ninth, central chapel dedicated to the Intercession; a tenth chapel was erected in 1588 over the grave of the venerated local saint Vasily (Basil). In the 16th and 17th centuries, it was perceived as the earthly symbol of the Heavenly City. Like all churches in Byzantine Christianity, the church was popularly known as the "Jerusalem" and served as an allegory of the Jerusalem Temple in the annual Palm Sunday parade attended by the patriarch of Moscow and the tsar of all Russia.

The cathedral has nine distinctive onion domes (each one corresponding to a different church) and is shaped like the flame of a bonfire rising into the sky. Russian historian Dmitry Shvidkovsky, in his book Russian Architecture and the West, states that "it is like no other Russian building. Nothing similar can be found in the entire millennium of Byzantine tradition from the fifth to the fifteenth century [...] a strangeness that astonishes by its unexpectedness, complexity and dazzling interleaving of the manifold details of its design." The cathedral foreshadowed the climax of Russian national architecture in the 17th century, and it is considered as a prime example of Russian Renaissance architecture.

As part of the program of state atheism, the church was confiscated from the Russian Orthodox community as part of the Soviet Union's antireligious campaigns and has operated as a division of the State Historical Museum since 1928. It was completely secularized in 1929, and remains a federal property of the Russian Federation. The church has been part of the Moscow Kremlin and Red Square UNESCO World Heritage Site since 1990. Following the dissolution of the Soviet Union in 1991, weekly liturgical celebration and prayers to St. Basil have been restored since 1997.

== History ==
=== Construction under Ivan IV ===
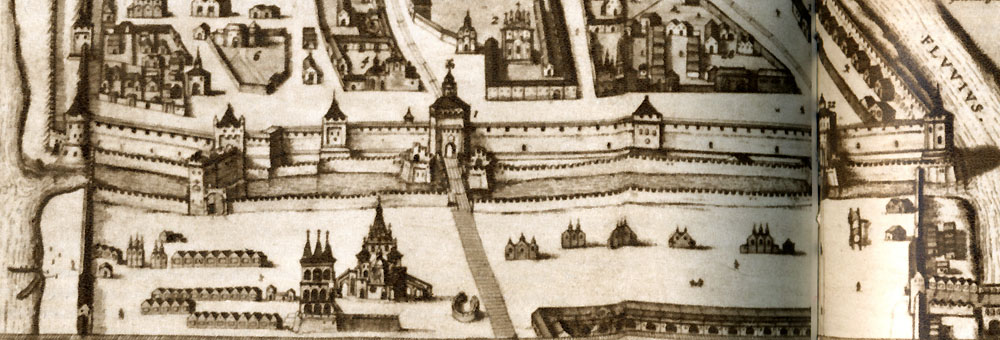
Red Square, early 17th-century. Fragment from Blaeu Atlas. The structure with three roof tents in the foreground left is the originally detached belfry of the Trinity Church, not drawn to scale. Trinity Church stands behind it, slightly closer to the road starting at St. Frol's (later Saviour's ) Gate of the Kremlin. The horseshoe-shaped object near the road in the foreground is Lobnoye Mesto.

The site of the church had historically been a busy marketplace between the St. Frol's (later Saviour's) Gate of the Moscow Kremlin and the outlying posad. The centre of the marketplace was marked by the Trinity Church, built of the same white stone as the Kremlin of Dmitry Donskoy (1366–68) and its cathedrals. Tsar Ivan IV marked every victory of the Russo-Kazan War by erecting a wooden memorial church next to the walls of Trinity Church; by the end of his Astrakhan campaign, it was shrouded within a cluster of seven wooden churches. According to the report in Nikon's Chronicle, in the autumn of 1554 Ivan ordered the construction of the wooden Church of Intercession on the same site, "on the moat". One year later, Ivan ordered the construction of a new stone cathedral on the site of Trinity Church to commemorate his campaigns. Dedication of a church to a military victory was "a major innovation" for Muscovy. The placement of the church outside the Kremlin walls was a political statement in favour of posad commoners and against hereditary boyars.

Contemporary commentators clearly identified the new building as Trinity Church, after its easternmost sanctuary; the status of "katholikon" (собор, sobor, large assembly church) had not been bestowed on it yet:

On the Trinity on the Moat in Moscow.
In the same year, through the will of czar and lord and grand prince Ivan began making the pledged church, as he promised for the capture of Kazan: Trinity and Intercession and seven sanctuaries, also called "on the moat". And the builder was Barma with company.

— Piskaryov Chronicle, 1560 (7068 per Byzantine calendar)

The identity of the architect is unknown. Tradition held that the church was built by two architects, Barma and Postnik: the official Russian cultural heritage register lists "Barma and Postnik Yakovlev". Researchers proposed that both names refer to the same person, Postnik Yakovlev or, alternatively, Ivan Yakovlevich Barma (Varfolomey). Legend held that Ivan blinded the architect so that he could not re-create the masterpiece elsewhere. Many historians are convinced that it is a myth, as the architect later participated in the construction of the Cathedral of the Annunciation in Moscow as well as in building the walls and towers of the Kazan Kremlin. Postnik Yakovlev remained active at least throughout the 1560s. This myth likely originated with Jerome Horsey's account of Ivan III of Moscow having blinded the architect of the fortress of Ivangorod.

There is evidence that construction involved stonemasons from Pskov and German lands.

=== Development ===
==== 1583–1596 ====
The original Trinity Church burnt down in 1583 and was refitted by 1593. The ninth sanctuary, dedicated to Basil Fool for Christ (the 1460s–1552), was added in 1588 next to the north-eastern sanctuary of the Three Patriarchs. Another local fool, Ivan the Blessed, was buried on the church grounds in 1589; a sanctuary in his memory was established in 1672 inside the south-eastern arcade.

The vault of the Saint Basil Sanctuary serves as a reference point in evaluating the quality of Muscovite stonemasonry and engineering. As one of the first vaults of its type, it represents the average of engineering craft that peaked a decade later in the church of the Trinity in Khoroshovo (completed 1596). The craft was lost in the Time of Troubles; buildings from the first half of the 17th century lack the refinement of the late 16th century, compensating for poor construction skill with thicker walls and heavier vaults.

==== 1680–1683 ====
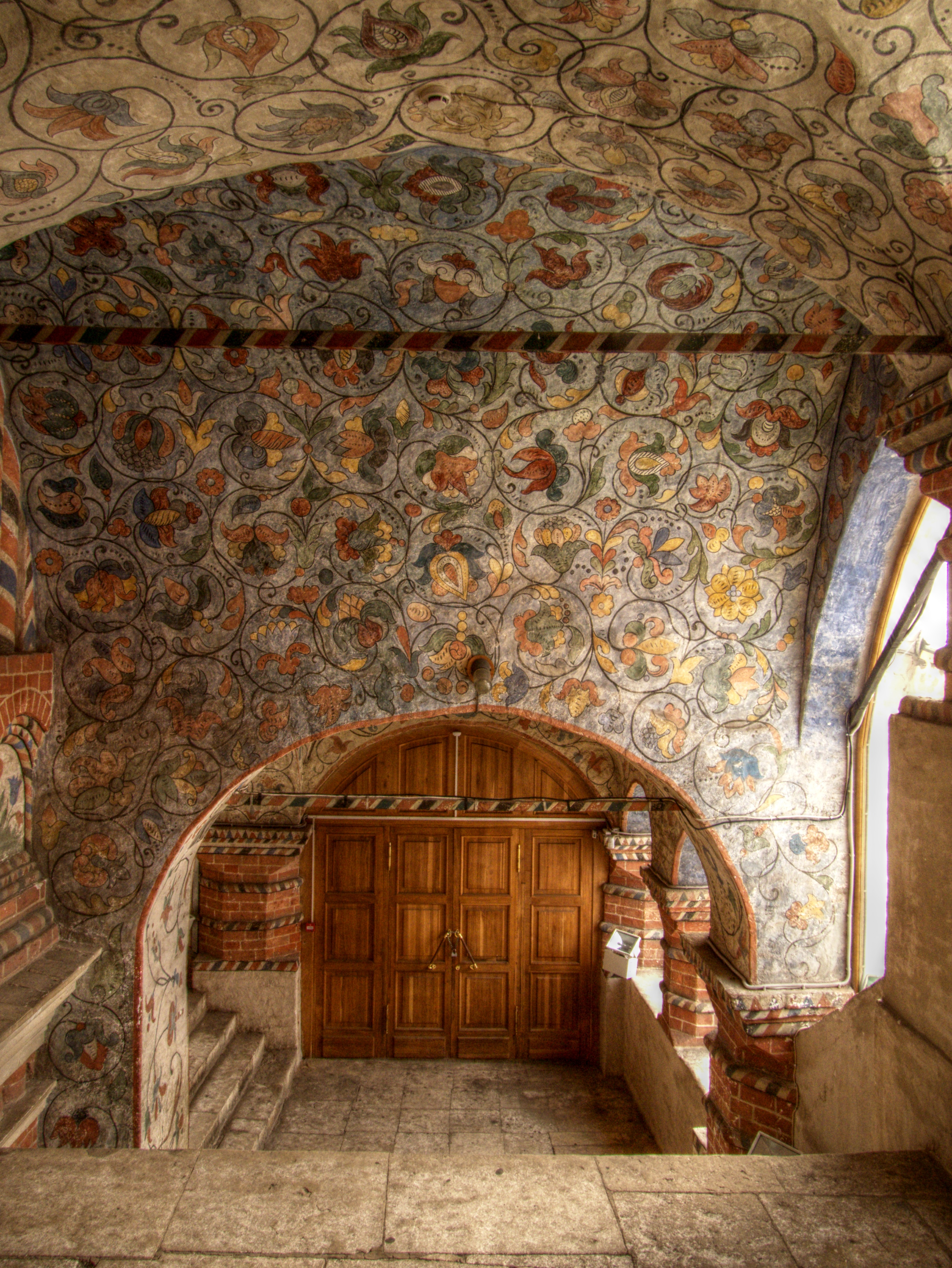
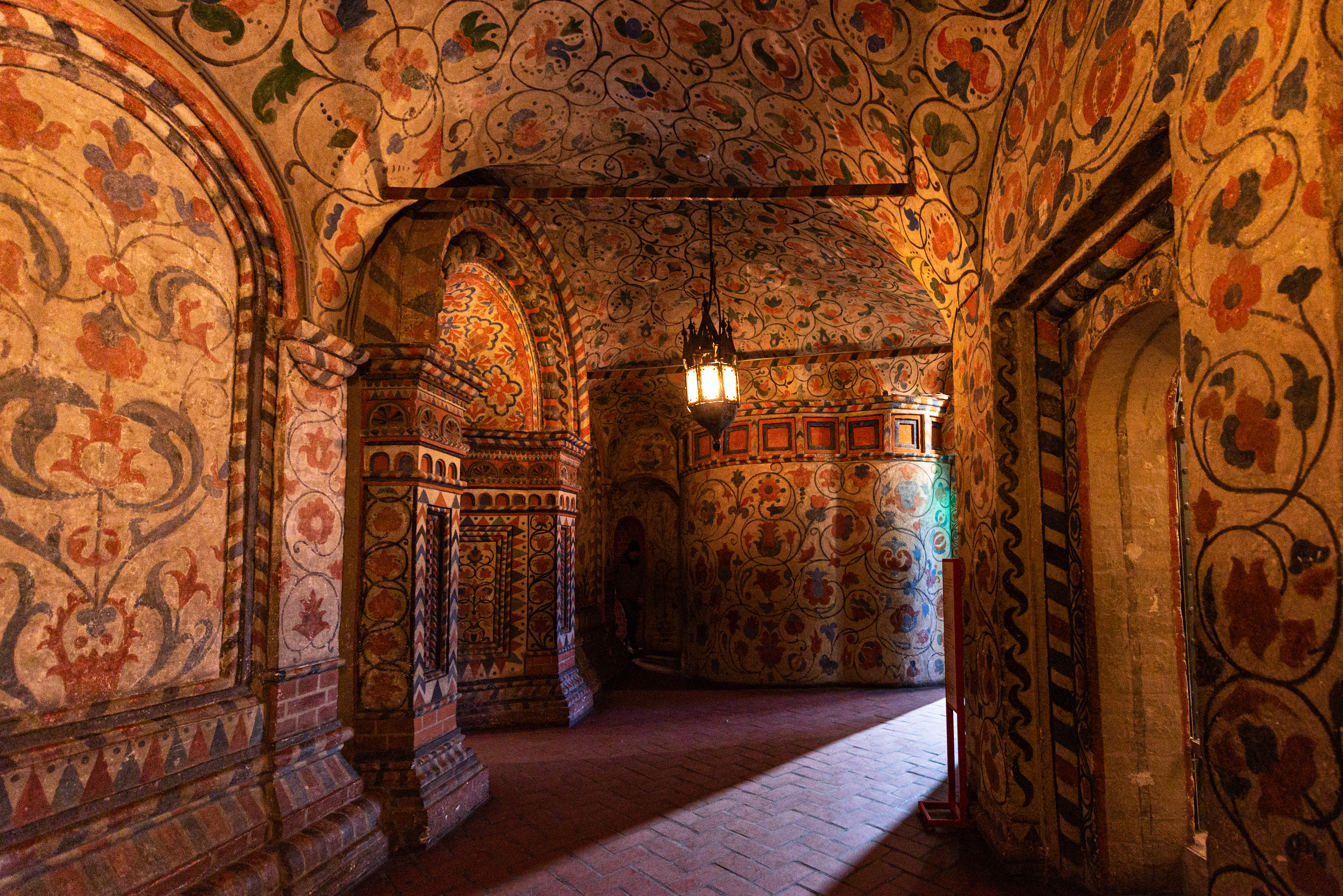
Murals in the galleries

The second, and most significant, round of refitting and expansion took place in 1680–1683. The nine churches themselves retained their appearance, but additions to the ground-floor arcade and the first-floor platform were so profound that Nikolay Brunov rebuilt a composite church from an "old" building and an independent work that incorporated the "new" Trinity Church. What once was a group of nine independent churches on a common platform became a monolithic temple.

The formerly open ground-floor arcades were filled with brick walls; the new space housed altars from thirteen former wooden churches erected on the site of Ivan's executions in Red Square. Wooden shelters above the first-floor platform and stairs (the cause of frequent fires) were rebuilt in brick, creating the present-day wrap-around galleries with tented roofs above the porches and vestibules.

The old detached belfry was demolished; its square basement was reused for a new belltower. The tall single tented roof of this belltower, built in the vernacular style of the reign of Alexis I, significantly changed the appearance of the cathedral, adding a strong asymmetrical counterweight to the church itself. The effect is most pronounced on the southern and eastern facades (as viewed from Zaryadye), although the belltower is large enough to be seen from the west.

The first ornamental murals in the cathedral appeared in the same period, starting with floral ornaments inside the new galleries; the towers retained their original brickwork pattern. Finally, in 1683, the church was adorned with a tiled cornice in yellow and blue, featuring a written history of the church in Old Slavic typeface.

==== 1737–1784 ====
In 1737, the church was damaged by a massive fire and later restored by Ivan Michurin. The inscriptions made in 1683 were removed during the repairs of 1761–1784. The church received its first figurative murals inside the churches; all exterior and interior walls of the first two floors were covered with floral ornamentation. The belltower was connected with the church through a ground-floor annex; the last remaining open arches of the former ground-floor arcade were filled during the same period, erasing the last hint of what was once an open platform carrying the nine churches of Ivan's Jerusalem.

==== 1800–1848 ====
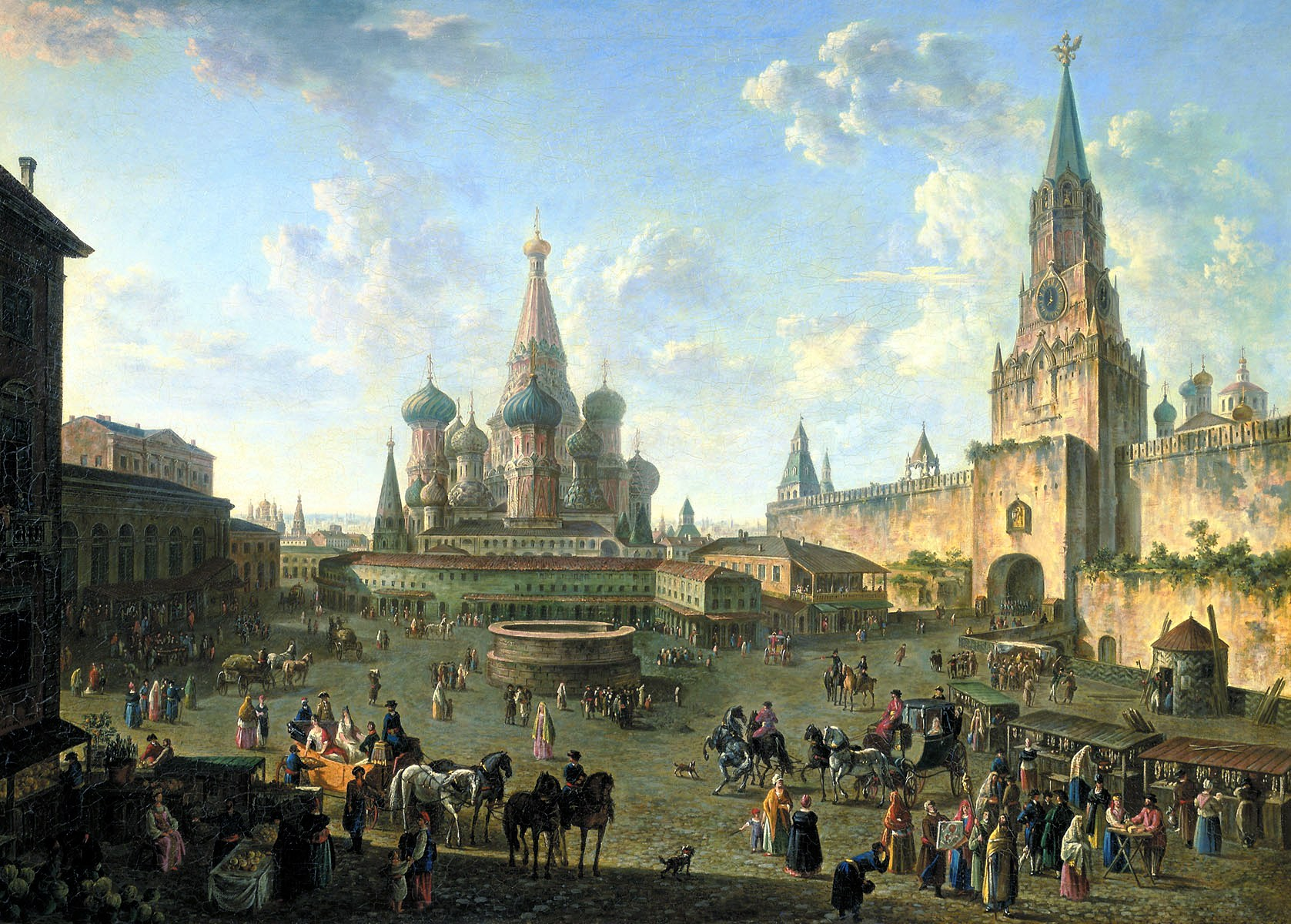
Red Square before the great fire of 1812 (Fyodor Alekseyev, 1802)

Paintings of Red Square by Fyodor Alekseyev, made in 1800–1802, show that by this time the church was enclosed in an apparently chaotic cluster of commercial buildings; rows of shops "transformed Red Square into an oblong and closed yard." In 1800 the space between the Kremlin wall and the church was still occupied by a moat that predated the church itself. The moat was filled in preparation for the coronation of Alexander I in 1801. The French troops who occupied Moscow in 1812 used the church for stables and looted anything worth taking. The church was spared by the Fire of Moscow (1812) that razed Kitai-gorod, and by the troops' failure to blow it up according to Napoleon's order. The interiors were repaired in 1813 and the exterior in 1816. Instead of replacing missing ceramic tiles of the main tent, the Church preferred to simply cover it with a tin roof.

The fate of the immediate environment of the church has been a subject of dispute between city planners since 1813. Scotsman William Hastie proposed clearing the space around all sides of the church and all the way down to the Moskva River; the official commission led by Fyodor Rostopchin and Mikhail Tsitsianov agreed to clear only the space between the church and Lobnoye Mesto. Hastie's plan could have radically transformed the city, but he lost to the opposition, whose plans were finally endorsed by Alexander I in December 1817 (the specific decision on clearing the rubble around the church was issued in 1816).

Nevertheless, actual redevelopment by Joseph Bove resulted in clearing the rubble and creating Vasilyevskaya (St. Basil's) Square between the church and Kremlin wall by shaving off the crest of the Kremlin Hill between the church and the Moskva River. Red Square was opened to the river, and "St. Basil thus crowned the decapitated hillock." Bove built the stone terrace wall separating the church from the pavement of Moskvoretskaya Street; the southern side of the terrace was completed in 1834. Minor repairs continued until 1848, when the domes acquired their present-day colours.

==== 1890–1914 ====
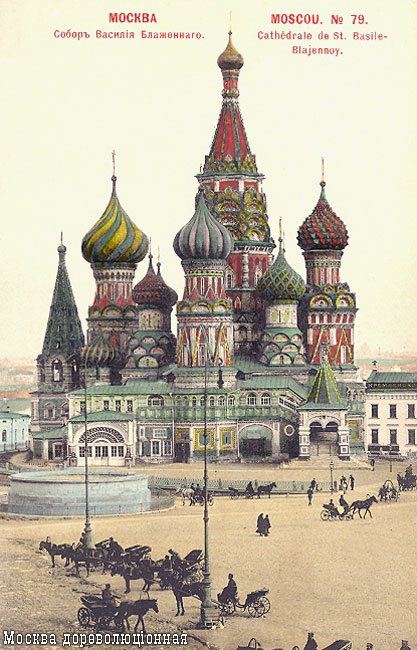
Postcard, early 20th century

Preservationist societies monitored the state of the church and called for a proper restoration throughout the 1880s and 1890s, but it was regularly delayed for lack of funds. The church did not have a congregation of its own and could only rely on donations raised through public campaigning; national authorities in Saint Petersburg and local in Moscow prevented financing from state and municipal budgets. In 1899 Nicholas II reluctantly admitted that this expense was necessary, but again all the involved state and municipal offices, including the Holy Synod, denied financing. Restoration, headed by Andrey Pavlinov (died 1898) and Sergey Solovyov, dragged on from 1896 to 1909; in total, preservationists managed to raise around 100,000 roubles.

Restoration began with replacing the roofing of the domes. Solovyov removed the tin roofing of the main tent installed in the 1810s and found many original tiles missing and others discoloured; after a protracted debate the whole set of tiles on the tented roof was replaced with new ones. Another dubious decision allowed the use of standard bricks that were smaller than the original 16th-century ones. Restorers agreed that the paintwork of the 19th century must be replaced with a "truthful recreation" of historic patterns, but these had to be reconstructed and deduced based on medieval miniatures. In the end, Solovyov and his advisers chose a combination of deep red with deep green that is retained to the present.

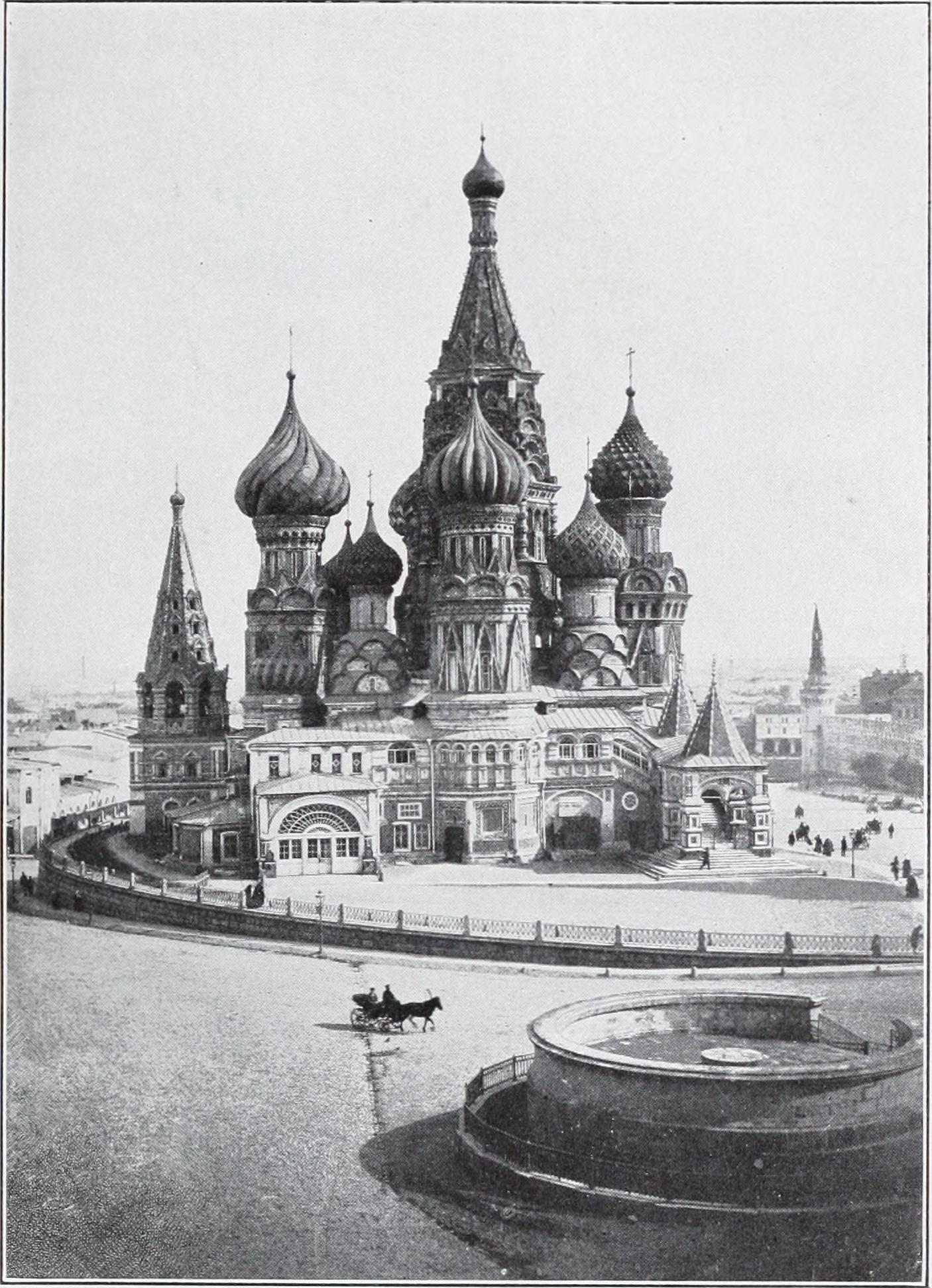
Saint Basil's Cathedral in 1910

In 1908 the church received its first warm air heating system, which did not work well because of heat losses in long air ducts, heating only the eastern and northern sanctuaries. In 1913 it was complemented with a pumped water heating system serving the rest of the church.

==== 1918–1941 ====
During World War I, the church was headed by protoiereus Ioann Vostorgov, a nationalist preacher and a leader of the Black-Hundredist Union of the Russian People. Vostorgov was arrested by Bolsheviks in 1918 on a pretext of embezzling nationalized church properties and was executed in 1919. The church briefly enjoyed Vladimir Lenin's "personal interest"; in 1923 it became a public museum, though religious services continued until 1929.

Bolshevik planners entertained ideas of demolishing the church after Lenin's funeral (January 1924). In the first half of the 1930s, the church became an obstacle for Joseph Stalin's urbanist plans, carried out by Moscow party boss Lazar Kaganovich, "the moving spirit behind the reconstruction of the capital". The conflict between preservationists, notably Pyotr Baranovsky, and the administration continued at least until 1936 and spawned urban legends. In particular, a frequently-told story is that Kaganovich picked up a model of the church in the process of envisioning Red Square without it, and Stalin sharply responded "Lazar, put it back!" Similarly, Stalin's master planner, architect Vladimir Semyonov, reputedly dared to "grab Stalin's elbow when the leader picked up a model of the church to see how Red Square would look without it" and was replaced by pure functionary Sergey Chernyshov.

In the autumn of 1933, the church was struck from the heritage register. Baranovsky was summoned to perform a last-minute survey of the church slated for demolition, and was then arrested for his objections. While he served his term in the Gulag, attitudes changed and by 1937 even hard-line Bolshevik planners admitted that the church should be spared. In the spring of 1939, the church was locked, probably because demolition was again on the agenda; however, the 1941 publication of Dmitry Sukhov's detailed book on the survey of the church in 1939–1940 speaks against this assumption.

==== 1947 to present ====
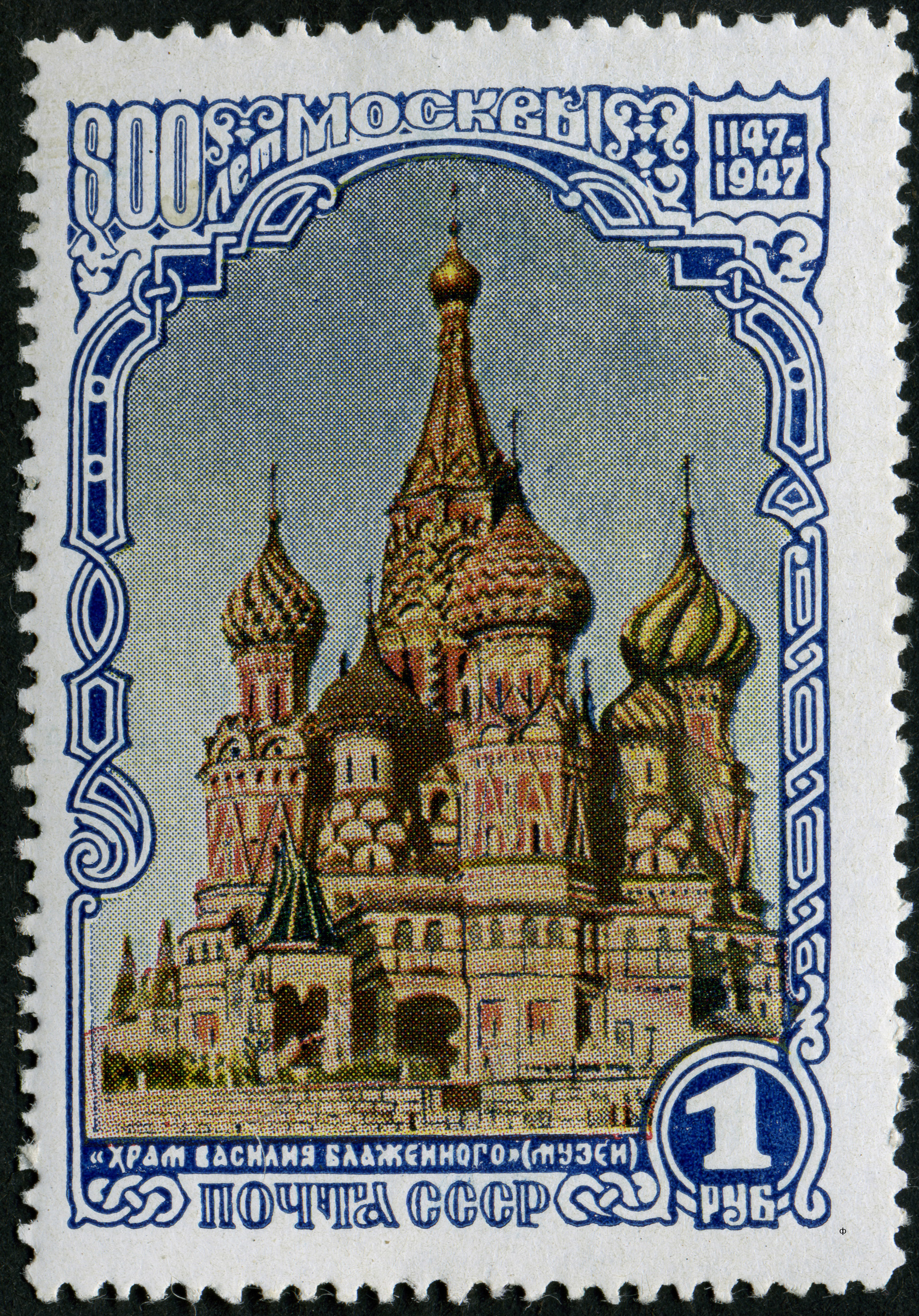
St Basil's on a 1947 postage stamp marking the renovation

In the first years after World War II, renovators restored the historical ground-floor arcades and pillars that supported the first-floor platform, cleared up vaulted and caissoned ceilings in the galleries, and removed "unhistoric" 19th-century oil paint murals inside the churches. Another round of repairs, led by Nikolay Sobolev in 1954–1955, restored original paint imitating brickwork, and allowed restorers to dig inside old masonry, revealing the wooden frame inside it. In the 1960s, the tin roofing of the domes was replaced with copper.

The last round of renovation was completed in September 2008 with the opening of the restored sanctuary of St. Alexander Svirsky. The building is still partly in use today as a museum and, since 1991, is occasionally used for services by the Russian Orthodox Church. Since 1997, Orthodox Christian services have been held regularly. Nowadays, every Sunday at Saint Basil's church, there is a divine liturgy at 10 a.m. with an Akathist to Saint Basil.

== Architectural style ==
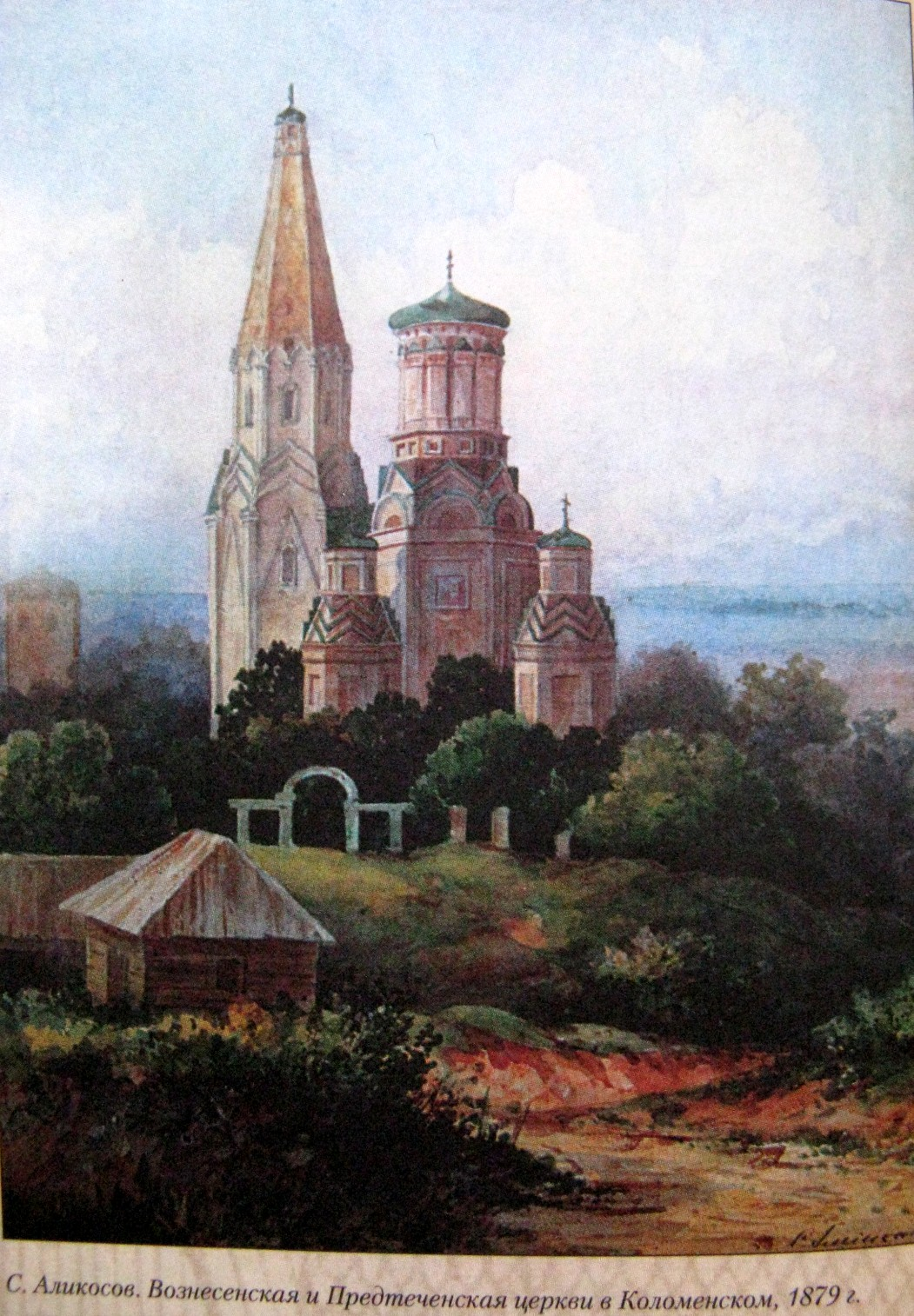
Ascension Church in Kolomenskoye (far left), a probable influence on the cathedral, and the Dyakovo church (centre)

Because the church has no analog—in the preceding, contemporary, or later architecture of Muscovy and Byzantine cultural tradition, in general,—the sources that inspired Barma and Postnik are disputed. Eugène Viollet-le-Duc rejected European roots for the cathedral, opining that its corbel arches were Byzantine and ultimately Asian. A modern "Asian" hypothesis considers the cathedral a recreation of Qolşärif Mosque, which was destroyed by Russian troops after the Siege of Kazan.

Nineteenth-century Russian writers, starting with Ivan Zabelin, emphasized the influence of the vernacular wooden churches of the Russian North; their motifs made their ways into masonry, particularly the votive churches that did not need to house substantial congregations. David Watkin also wrote of a blend of Russian and Byzantine roots, calling the cathedral "the climax" of Russian vernacular wooden architecture.

The church combines the staggered layered design of the earliest (1505–1508) part of the Ivan the Great Bell Tower, the central tent of the Church of Ascension in Kolomenskoye (1530s), and the cylindric shape of the Church of Beheading of John the Baptist in Dyakovo (1547); but the origin of these unique buildings is equally debated. The Church in Kolomenskoye, according to Sergei Podyapolsky, was built by Italian Petrok Maly, although mainstream history has not yet accepted his opinion. Andrey Batalov revised the year of completion of Dyakovo church from 1547 to the 1560s–70s, and noted that Trinity Church could have had no tangible predecessors at all.

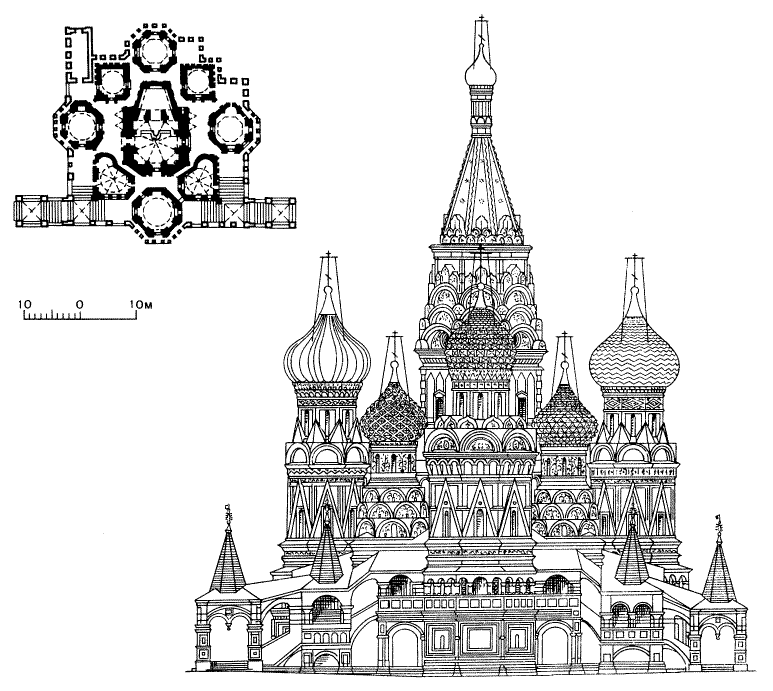
Front elevation drawing of the cathedral's façade and overhead view of floor plan

Dmitry Shvidkovsky suggested that the "improbable" shapes of the Intercession Church and the Church of Ascension in Kolomenskoye manifested an emerging national renaissance, blending earlier Muscovite elements with the influence of Italian Renaissance. A large group of Italian architects and craftsmen continuously worked in Moscow in 1474–1539, as well as Greek refugees who arrived in the city after the fall of Constantinople. These two groups, according to Shvidkovsky, helped Moscow rulers in forging the doctrine of Third Rome, which in turn promoted assimilation of contemporary Greek and Italian culture. Shvidkovsky noted the resemblance of the cathedral's floorplan to Italian concepts by Antonio da Sangallo the Younger and Donato Bramante, but most likely Filarete's Trattato di architettura. Other Russian researchers noted a resemblance to sketches by Leonardo da Vinci, although he could not have been known in Ivan's Moscow. Nikolay Brunov recognized the influence of these prototypes but not their significance; he suggested that mid-16th century Moscow already had local architects trained in Italian tradition, architectural drawing and perspective, and that this culture was lost during the Time of Troubles.

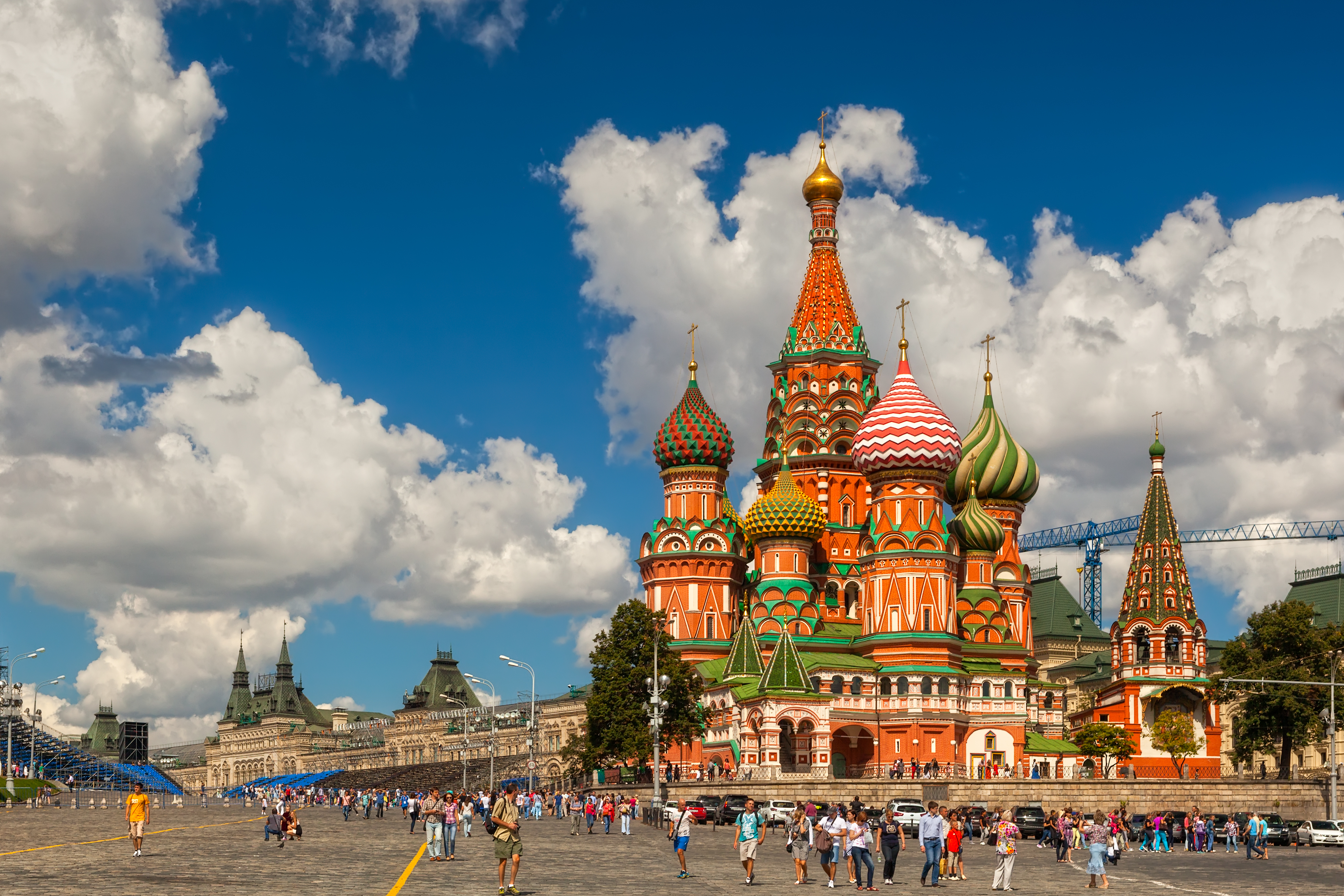
Crowd in Red Square in front of the cathedral

Andrey Batalov wrote that judging by the number of novel elements introduced with Trinity Church, it was most likely built by German craftsmen. Batalov and Shvidkovsky noted that during Ivan's reign, Germans and Englishmen replaced Italians, although German influence peaked later during the reign of Mikhail Romanov. German influence is indirectly supported by the rusticated pilasters of the central church, a feature more common in contemporary Northern Europe than in Italy.

The 1983 academic edition of Monuments of Architecture in Moscow takes the middle ground: the church is, most likely, a product of the complex interaction of distinct Russian traditions of wooden and stone architecture, with some elements borrowed from the works of Italians in Moscow. Specifically, the style of brickwork in the vaults is Italian.

== Layout ==
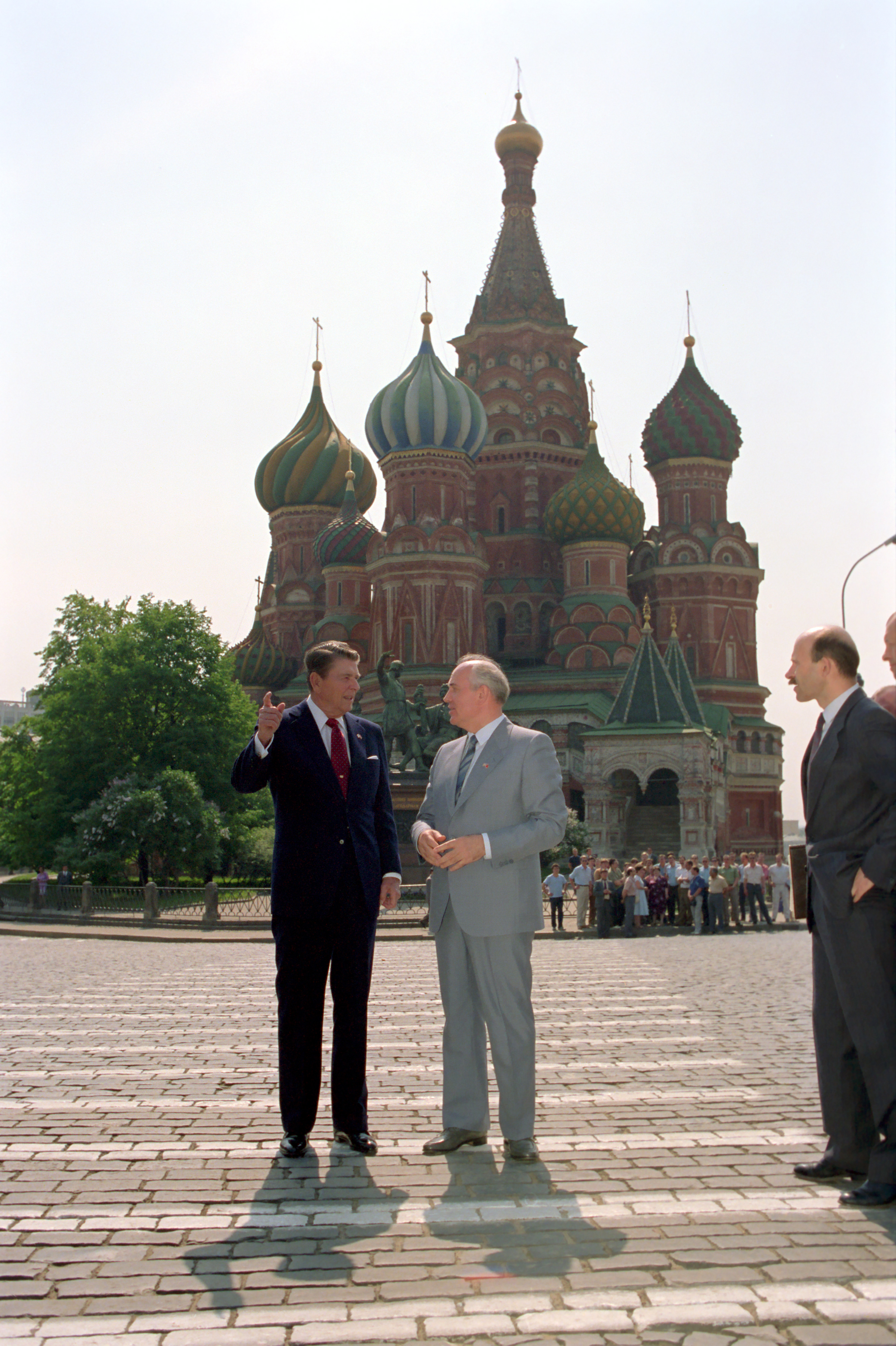
Ronald Reagan and Mikhail Gorbachev in front of the cathedral in 1988

Instead of following the original ad hoc layout (seven churches around the central core), Ivan's architects opted for a more symmetrical floor plan with eight side churches around the core, producing "a thoroughly coherent, logical plan" despite the erroneous latter "notion of a structure devoid of restraint or reason" influenced by the memory of Ivan's irrational atrocities. The central core and the four larger churches placed on the four major compass points are octagonal; the four diagonally placed smaller churches are cuboid, although their shape is hardly visible through later additions. The larger churches stand on massive foundations, while the smaller ones were each placed on a raised platform as if hovering above ground.

Although the side churches are arranged in perfect symmetry, the cathedral as a whole is not. The larger central church was deliberately offset to the west from the geometric centre of the side churches, to accommodate its larger apse on the eastern side. As a result of this subtle calculated asymmetry, viewing from the north and the south presents a complex multi-axial shape, while the western façade, facing the Kremlin, appears properly symmetrical and monolithic. The latter perception is reinforced by the fortress-style machicolation and corbeled cornice of the western Church of Entry into Jerusalem, mirroring the real fortifications of the Kremlin.

Inside the composite church is a labyrinth of narrow vaulted corridors and vertical cylinders of the churches. Today the cathedral consists of nine individual chapels. The largest, central one, the Church of the Intercession, is 46 metres (151 ft) tall internally but has a floor area of only 64 square metres (690 sq ft). Nevertheless, it is wider and airier than the church in Kolomenskoye with its exceptionally thick walls. The corridors functioned as internal parvises; the western corridor, adorned with a unique flat caissoned ceiling, doubled as the narthex.

The detached belfry of the original Trinity Church stood southwest or south of the main structure. Late 16th- and early 17th-century plans depict a simple structure with three roof tents, most likely covered with sheet metal. No buildings of this type survive to date, although it was then common and used in all of the pass-through towers of Skorodom. August von Meyenberg's panorama (1661) presents a different building, with a cluster of small onion domes.

== Structure ==
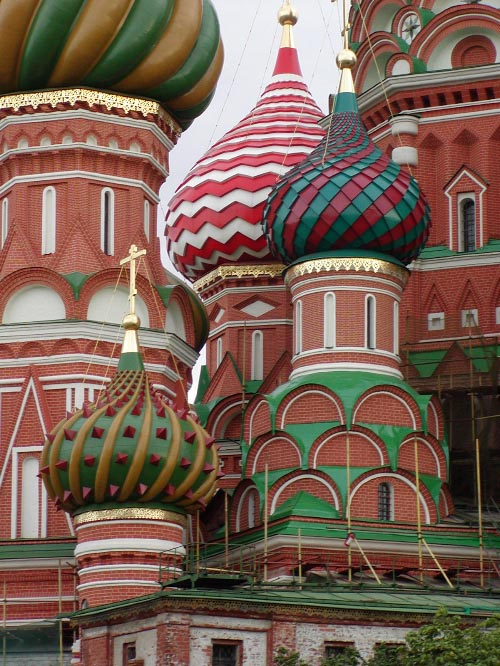
The small dome on the left marks the sanctuary of Basil the Blessed (1588)

The foundations, as was traditional in medieval Moscow, were built of white stone, while the churches themselves were built of red brick (28 by 14 by 8 cm (11.0 by 5.5 by 3.1 in)), then a relatively new material (the first attested brick building in Moscow, the new Kremlin Wall, was started in 1485). Surveys of the structure show that the basement level is perfectly aligned, indicating use of professional drawing and measurement, but each subsequent level becomes less and less regular. Restorers who replaced parts of the brickwork in 1954–1955 discovered that the massive brick walls conceal an internal wooden frame running the entire height of the church. This frame, made of elaborately tied thin studs, was erected as a life-size spatial model of the future cathedral and was then gradually enclosed in solid masonry.

The builders, fascinated by the flexibility of the new technology, used red bricks as a decorative medium both inside and out, leaving as much brickwork open as possible; when location required the use of stone walls, it was decorated with a brickwork pattern painted over stucco. A major novelty introduced by the church was the use of strictly "architectural" means of exterior decoration. Sculpture and sacred symbols employed by earlier Russian architecture are completely missing; floral ornaments are a later addition. Instead, the church boasts a diversity of three-dimensional architectural elements executed in brick.

== Color ==
The church acquired its present-day vivid colours in several stages from the 1680s to 1848. Russian attitude towards colour in the 17th century changed in favour of bright colours; iconographic and mural art experienced an explosive growth in the number of available paints, dyes and their combinations. The original colour scheme, missing these innovations, was far less challenging. It followed the depiction of the Heavenly City in the Book of Revelation:

And he that sat was to look upon like a jasper and a sardine stone: and there was a rainbow round about the throne, in sight like unto an emerald.
And round about the throne were four and twenty seats: and upon the seats, I saw four and twenty elders sitting, clothed in white raiment; and they had on their heads crowns of gold.

— Revelation, 4:3–4 (KJV)

Colour scheme of the cathedral seen by night

The 25 seats from the biblical reference are alluded to in the building's structure, with the addition of eight small onion domes around the central tent, four around the western side church and four elsewhere. This arrangement survived through most of the 17th century. The walls of the church mixed bare red brickwork or painted imitation of bricks with white ornaments, in roughly equal proportion. The domes, covered with tin, were uniformly gilded, creating an overall bright but fairly traditional combination of white, red and golden colours. Moderate use of green and blue ceramic inserts provided a touch of rainbow as prescribed by the Bible.

While historians agree on the colour of the 16th-century domes, their shape is disputed. Boris Eding wrote that they most likely were of the same onion shape as the present-day domes. However, both Kolomenskoye and Dyakovo churches have flattened hemispherical domes, and the same type could have been used by Barma and Postnik.

== Naming ==
The building, originally known as "Trinity Church", was consecrated on 12 July 1561, and was subsequently elevated to the status of a sobor (similar to an ecclesiastical basilica in the Catholic Church, but usually and incorrectly translated as "cathedral"). "Trinity", according to tradition, refers to the easternmost sanctuary of the Holy Trinity, while the central sanctuary of the church is dedicated to the Intercession of Mary. Together with the westernmost sanctuary of the Entry into Jerusalem, these sanctuaries form the main east–west axis (Christ, Mary, Holy Trinity), while other sanctuaries are dedicated to individual saints.

Sanctuaries of the cathedral
Compass point	Type	Dedicated to	Commemorates
Central core	Tented church	Intercession of Most Holy Theotokos	Beginning of the final assault of Kazan, 1 October 1552
West	Column	Entry of Christ into Jerusalem	Triumph of the Muscovite troops
North-west	Groin vault	Saint Gregory the Illuminator of Armenia	Capture of Ars Tower of Kazan Kremlin, 30 September 1552
North	Column	Saint Martyrs Cyprian and Justinia (since 1786 Saint Adrian and Natalia of Nicomedia)	Complete capture of Kazan Kremlin, 2 October 1552
North-east	Groin vault	Three Patriarchs of Alexandria (since 1680 Saint John the Merciful)	Defeat of Yepancha's cavalry on 30 August 1552
East	Column	Life-giving Holy Trinity	Historical Trinity Church on the same site
South-east	Groin vault	Saint Alexander Svirsky	Defeat of Yepancha's cavalry on 30 August 1552
South	Column	The icon of Saint Nicholas from the Velikaya River (Nikola Velikoretsky)	The icon was brought to Moscow in 1555.
South-west	Groin vault	Saint Barlaam of Khutyn	May have been built to commemorate Vasili III of Russia
North-eastern annex (1588)	Groin vault	Basil the Blessed	Grave of venerated local saint
South-eastern annex (1672)	Groin vault	Laying the Veil (since 1680: Nativity of Theotokos, since 1916: Saint John the Blessed of Moscow)	Grave of venerated local saint

The name "Intercession Church" came into use later, coexisting with Trinity Church. From the end of the 16th century to the end of the 17th century the cathedral was also popularly called Jerusalem, with reference to its church of Entry into Jerusalem as well as to its sacral role in religious rituals. Finally, the name of Vasily (Basil) the Blessed, who died during construction and was buried on-site, was attached to the church at the beginning of the 17th century.

Current Russian tradition accepts two coexisting names of the church: the official "Church of Intercession on the Moat" (in full, the "Church of Intercession of Most Holy Theotokos on the Moat"), and the "Temple of Basil the Blessed". When these names are listed together the latter name, being informal, is always mentioned second.

The common Western translations "Cathedral of Basil the Blessed" and "Saint Basil's Cathedral" incorrectly bestow the status of cathedral on the church of Basil, but are nevertheless widely used even in academic literature. Especially during the 19. century, in English and other languages the Saint Basil's Cathedral was also called (Cathedral or Church of) Vassili Blagennoi.

== Sacral and social role ==
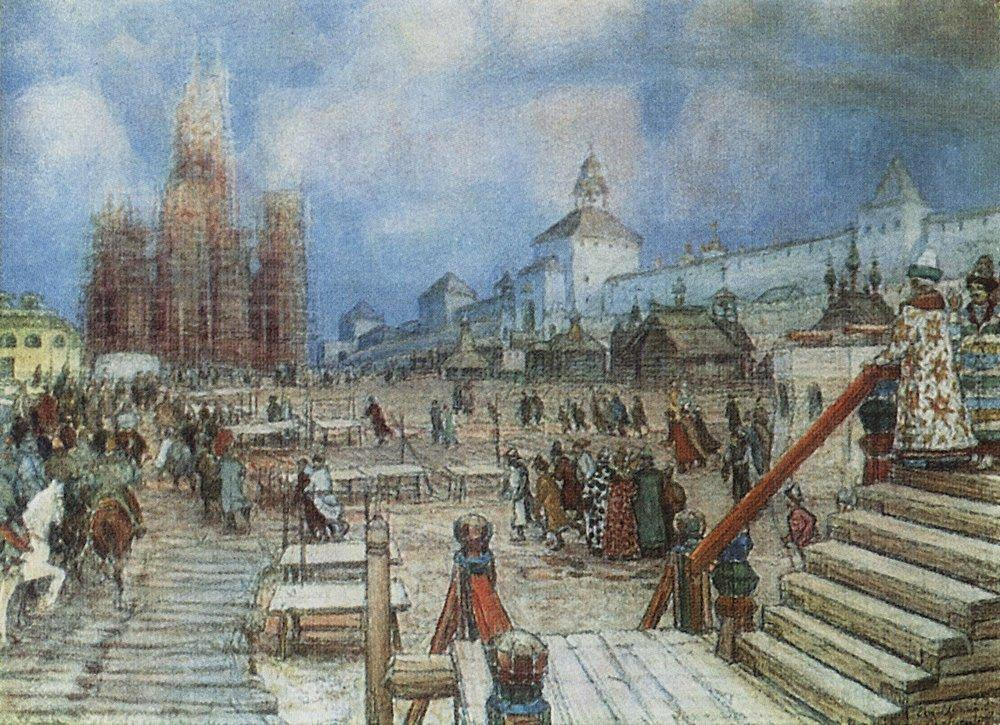
Trinity Cathedral under construction (Apollinary Vasnetsov, 1902)

=== Miraculous find ===
On the day of its consecration the church itself became part of Orthodox thaumaturgy. According to the legend, its "missing" ninth church (more precisely a sanctuary) was "miraculously found" during a ceremony attended by Tsar Ivan IV, Metropolitan Makarius with the divine intervention of Saint Tikhon. Piskaryov's Chronist wrote in the second quarter of the 17th century:

And the Tsar came to the dedication of the said church with Tsaritsa Nastasia and with Metropolitan Makarius and brought the icon of St Nicholas the Wonderworker that came from Vyatka. And they began to offer a prayer service with sanctified water. And the Tsar touched the base with his own hands. And the builders saw that another sanctuary appeared, and told the Tsar. And the Tsar, and Metropolitan, and all the clergy were surprised by the finding of another sanctuary. And the Tsar ordered it to be dedicated to Nicholas ...

— Piskaryov Chronicle, 1560 (7068 per Byzantine calendar)

=== Allegory of Jerusalem ===
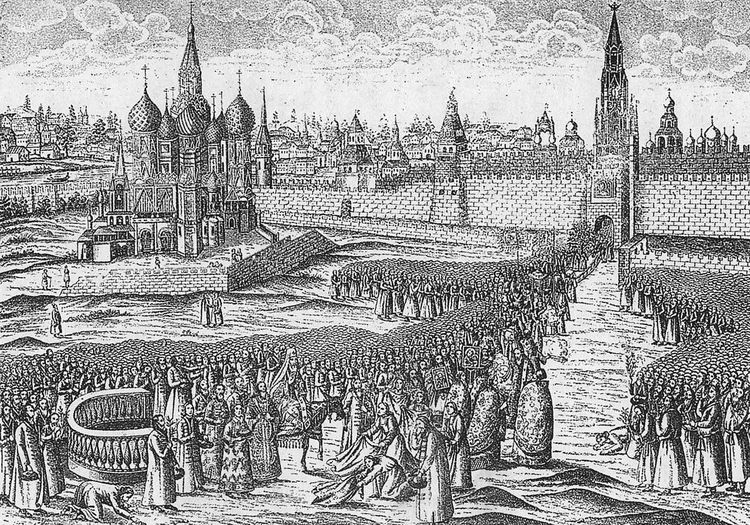
Palm Sunday procession (Dutch print, 17th century).

Construction of wrap-around ground-floor arcades in the 1680s visually united the nine churches of the original cathedral into a single building. Earlier, the clergy and the public perceived it as nine distinct churches on a common base, a generalized allegory of the Orthodox Heavenly City similar to fantastic cities of medieval miniatures. At a distance, separate churches towering over their base resembled the towers and churches of a distant citadel rising above the defensive wall. The abstract allegory was reinforced by real-life religious rituals where the church played the role of the biblical Temple in Jerusalem:

The capital city, Moscow, is split into three parts; the first of them, called Kitai-gorod, is encircled with a solid thick wall. It contains an extraordinary beautiful church, all clad in shiny bright gems, called Jerusalem. It is the destination of an annual Palm Sunday walk, when the Grand Prince must lead a donkey carrying the Patriarch, from the Church of Virgin Mary to the church of Jerusalem which stands next to the citadel walls. Here is where the most illustrious princely, noble and merchant families live. Here is, also, the main muscovite marketplace: the trading square is built as a brick rectangle, with twenty lanes on each side where the merchants have their shops and cellars ...

— Peter Petreius, History of the Great Duchy of Moscow, 1620

Templum S. Trinitatis, etiam Hierusalem dicitur; ad quo Palmarum fest Patriarcha asino insidens a Caesare introducitur.
Temple of Holy Trinity, also called Jerusalem, to where the tsar leads the Patriarch, sitting on a donkey, on the Palm Holiday.

— Legend of Peter's map of Moscow, 1597, as reproduced in the Bleau Atlas

The last donkey walk (хождение на осляти) took place in 1693. Mikhail Petrovich Kudryavtsev noted that all cross processions of the period began, as described by Petreius, from the Dormition Church, passed through St. Frol's (Saviour's) Gate and ended at Trinity Cathedral. For these processions the Kremlin itself became an open-air temple, properly oriented from its "narthex" (Cathedral Square) in the west, through the "royal doors" (Saviour's Gate), to the "sanctuary" (Trinity Cathedral) in the east.

=== Urban hub ===
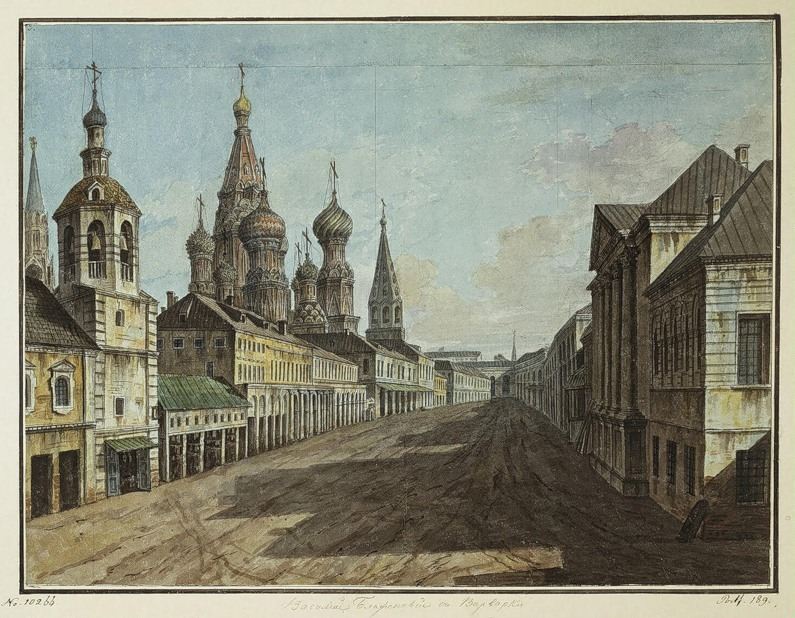
Intercession Cathedral looms over the streets of Zaryadye (Fyodor Alekseyev, 1802).

Tradition calls the Kremlin the centre of Moscow, but the geometric centre of the Garden Ring, first established as the Skorodom defensive wall in the 1590s, lies outside the Kremlin wall, coincident with the cathedral. Pyotr Goldenberg (1902–71), who popularized this notion in 1947, still regarded the Kremlin as the starting seed of Moscow's radial-concentric system, despite Alexander Chayanov's earlier suggestion that the system was not strictly concentric at all.

In the 1960s Gennady Mokeev (born 1932) formulated a different concept of the historical growth of Moscow. According to Mokeev, medieval Moscow, constrained by the natural boundaries of the Moskva and Neglinnaya Rivers, grew primarily in a north-easterly direction into the posad of Kitai-gorod and beyond. The main road connecting the Kremlin to Kitai-gorod passed through St. Frol's (Saviour's) Gate and immediately afterwards fanned out into at least two radial streets (present-day Ilyinka and Varvarka), forming the central market square. In the 14th century the city was largely contained within two balancing halves, Kremlin and Kitai-gorod, separated by a marketplace, but by the end of the century it extended further along the north-eastern axis. Two secondary hubs in the west and south spawned their own street networks, but their development lagged behind until the Time of Troubles.

Tsar Ivan's decision to build the church next to St. Frol's Gate established the dominance of the eastern hub with a major vertical accent, and inserted a pivot point between the nearly equal Kremlin and Kitai-gorod into the once amorphous marketplace. The cathedral was the main church of the posad, and at the same time it was perceived as a part of the Kremlin thrust into the posad, a personal messenger of the Tsar reaching the masses without the mediation of the boyars and clergy. It was complemented by the nearby Lobnoye mesto, a rostrum for the Tsar's public announcements first mentioned in chronicles in 1547 and rebuilt in stone in 1597–1598. Conrad Bussow, describing the triumph of False Dmitriy I, wrote that on 3 June 1606 "a few thousand men hastily assembled and followed the boyarin with [the impostor's] letter through the whole Moscow to the main church they call Jerusalem that stands right next to the Kremlin gates, raised him on Lobnoye Mesto, called out for the Muscovites, read the letter and listened to the boyarin's oral explanation."

== Replicas ==
A scale model of Saint Basil's Cathedral has been built in Jalainur in Inner Mongolia, near China's border with Russia. The building houses a science museum.

== Gallery ==
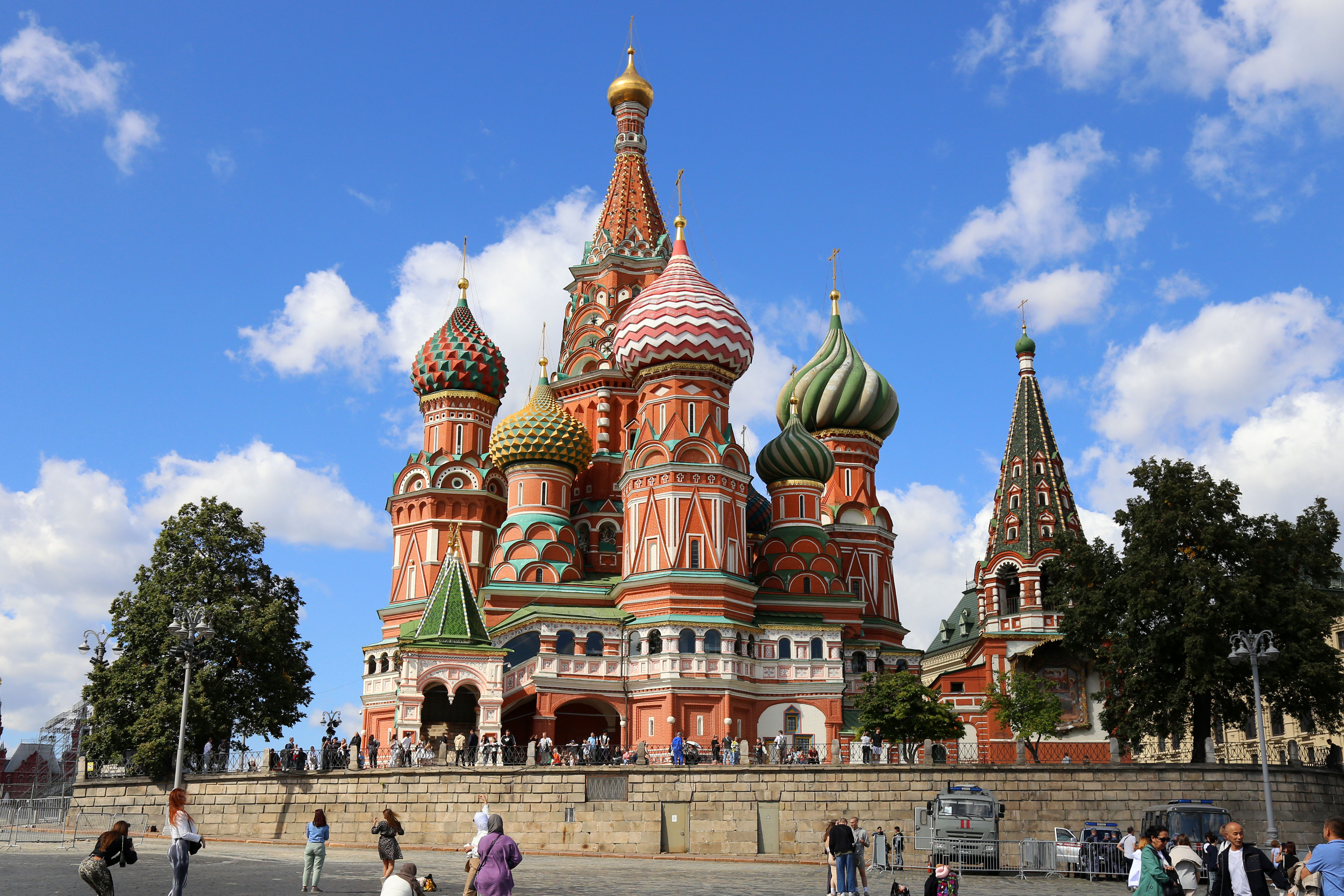

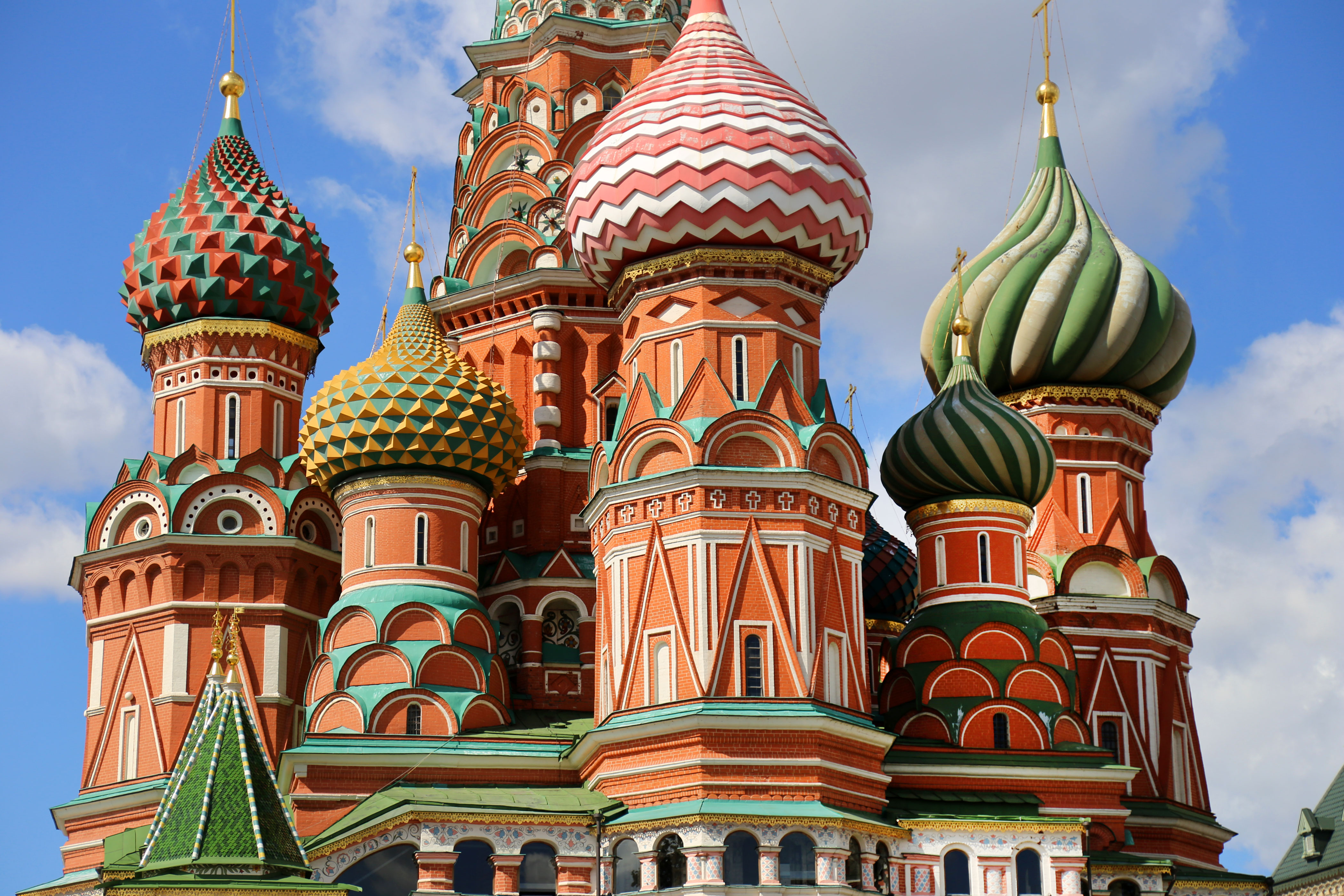

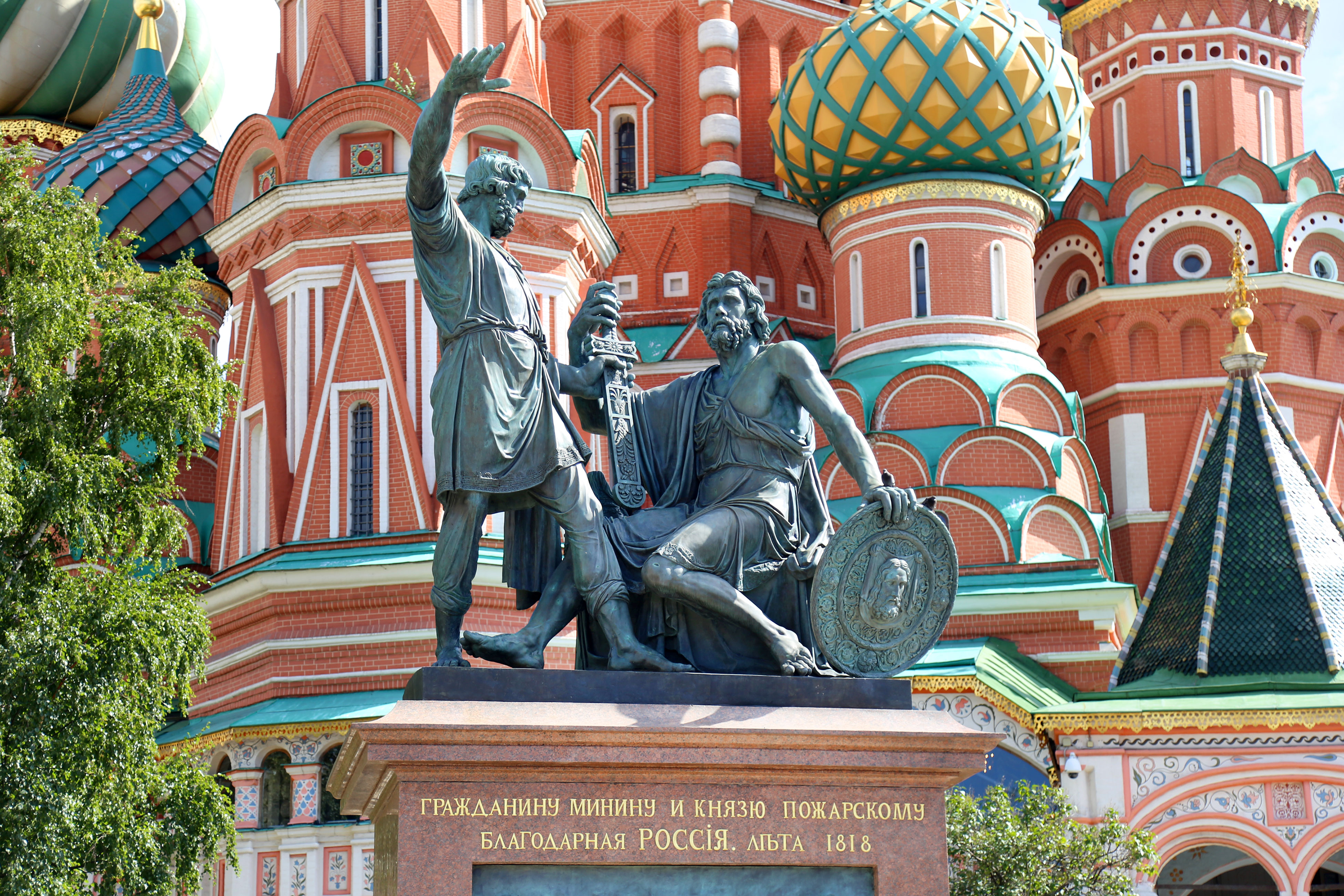
Monument to Minin and Pozharsky

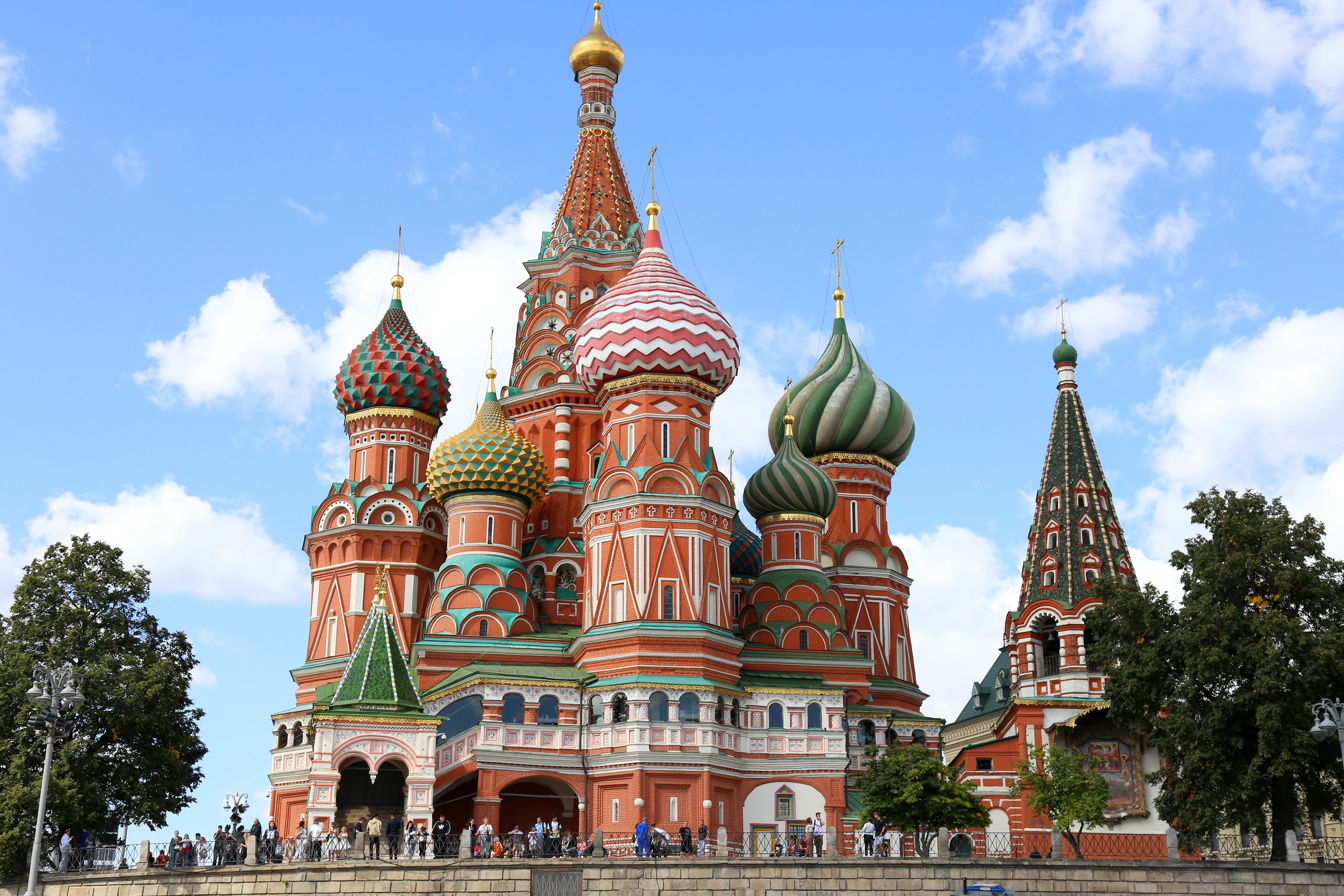

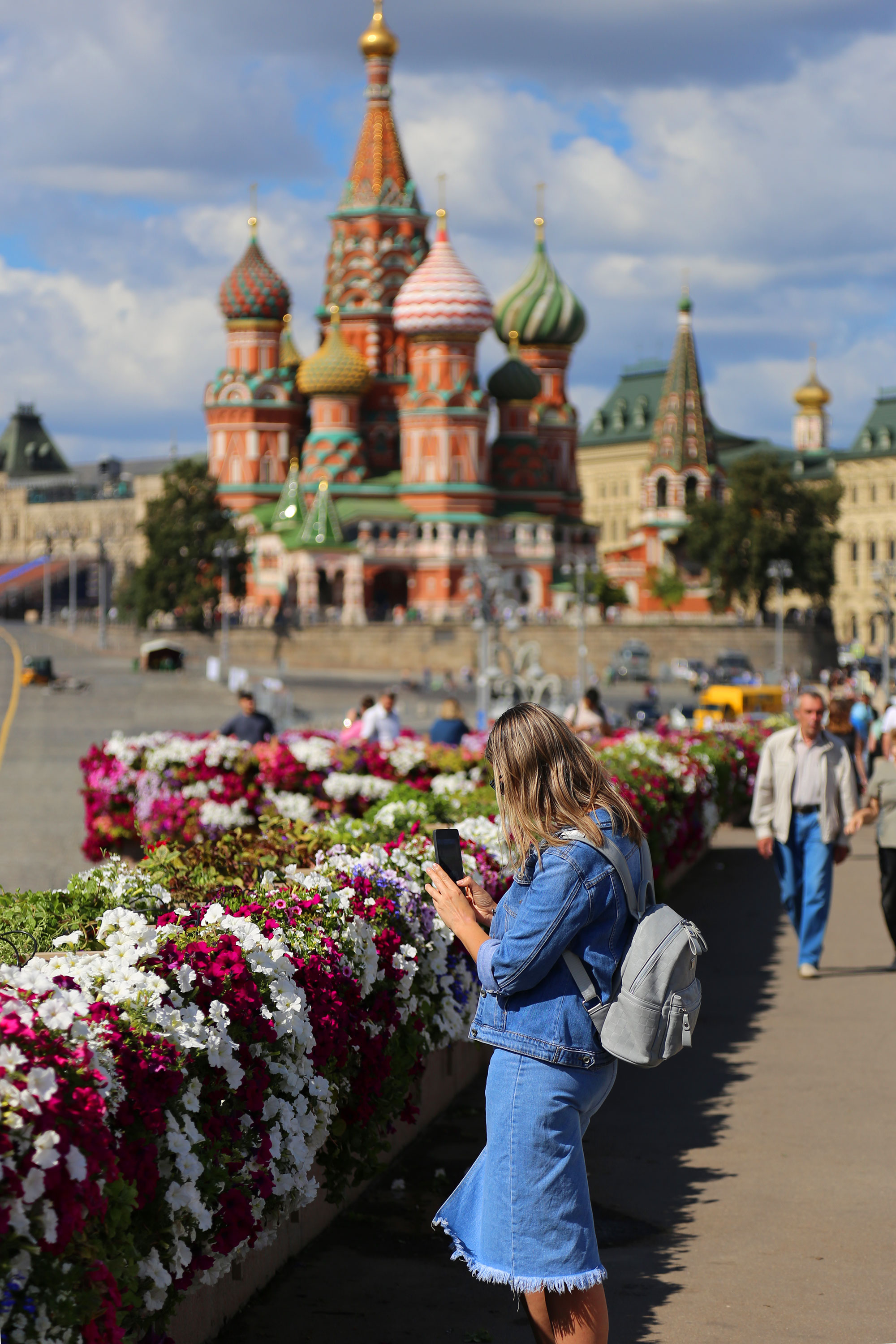

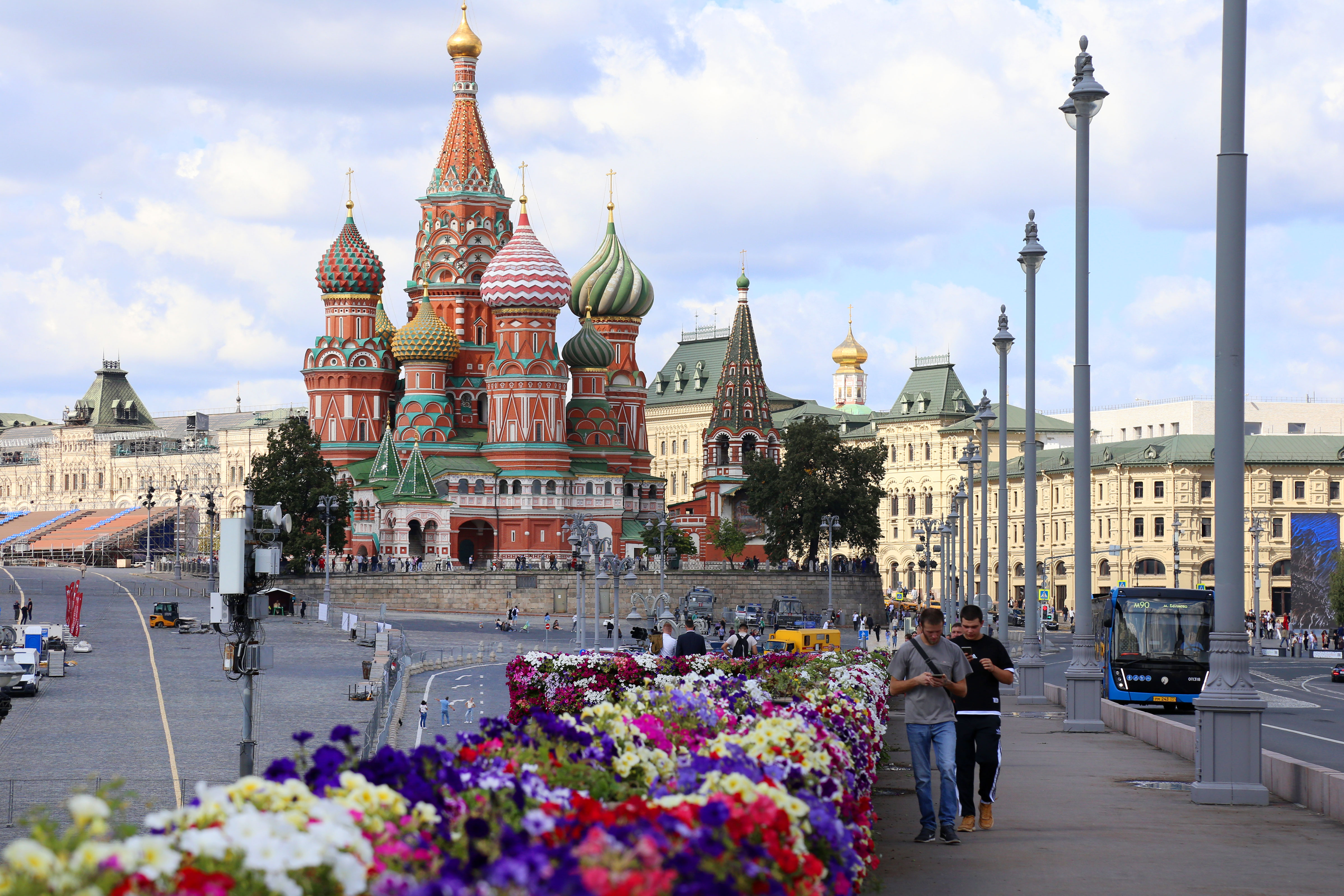

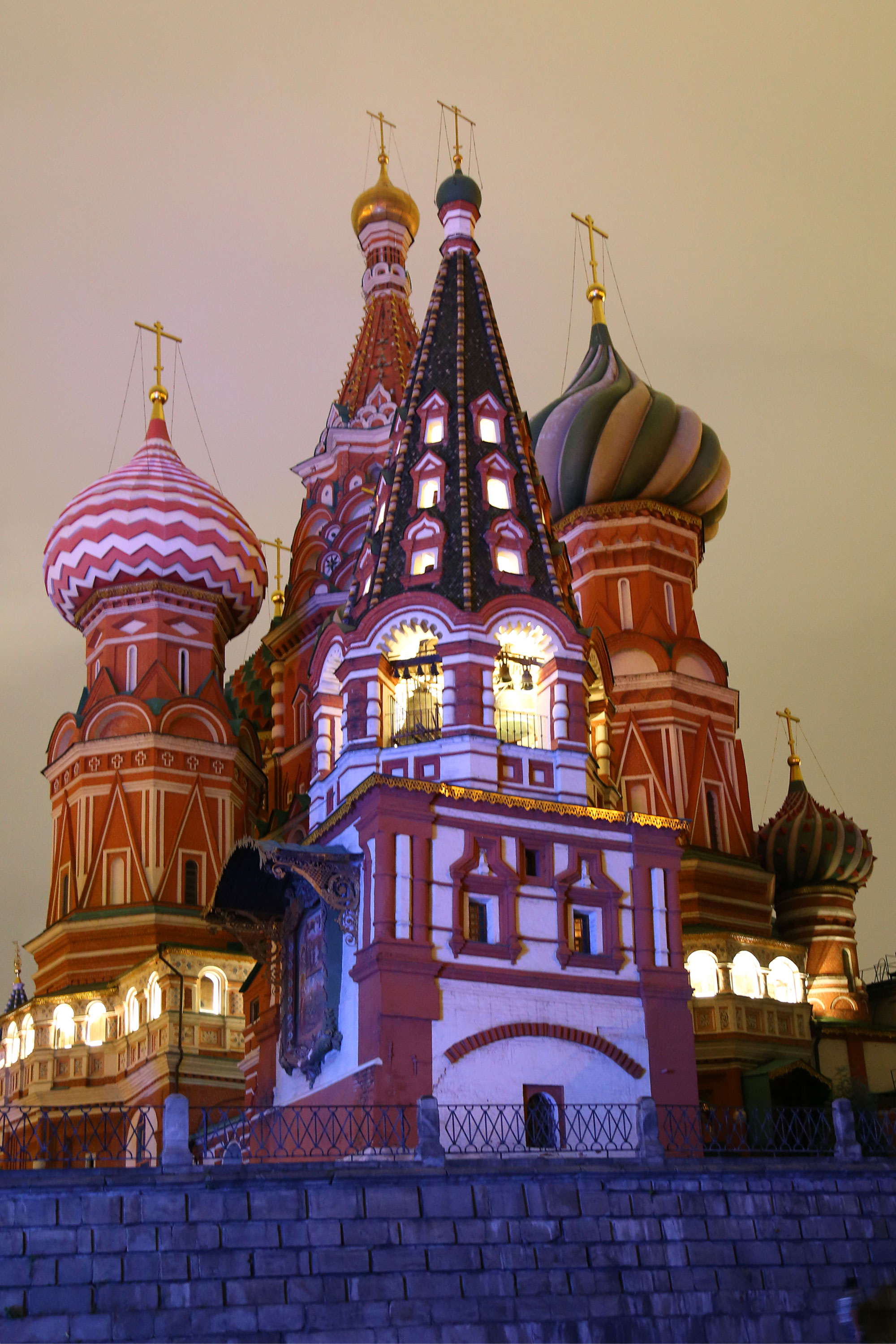

Soviet 5-ruble commemorative coin (1989) honoring Saint Basil's Cathedral. Obverse (right) shows the USSR state emblem; reverse (left) depicts the cathedral with its completion year, 1561.

== Sources ==
- Batalov, Andrey (1998). "O datirovke tserkvi useknovenia glavy Ioanna Predtechi v Dyakovo (О датировке церкви усекновения главы Иоанна Предтечи в Дьякове)" (PDF). Materialy I Issledovania. Muzei Moskovskogo Kremlya (Материалы И Исследования. Музеи Московского Кремля) (in Russian). XI. Archived from the original (PDF) on 18 July 2011.
- Brumfield, William Craft (1997). Landmarks of Russian Architecture: A Photographic Survey. Routledge. ISBN 978-90-5699-537-9.
- Brunov, N. I. (1988). Hram Vasilia Blazhennogo v Moskve (Храм Василия Блаженного в Москве. Покровский собор) (in Russian). Iskusstvo.
- Buseva-Davydova, I. L. (2008). Kultura i iskusstvo v epohy peremen (Культура и искусство в эпоху перемен) (in Russian). Indrik. ISBN 978-5-85759-439-1.
- Bushkovitch, Paul (2001). Peter the Great: the struggle for power, 1671–1725. Cambridge University Press. ISBN 978-0-521-80585-8.
- Colton, Timothy J. (1998). Moscow: Governing the Socialist Metropolis. Harvard University. ISBN 978-0-674-58749-6.
- Cracraft, James; Rowland, Daniel Bruce (2003). Architectures of Russian Identity: 1500 to the Present. Cornell University Press. ISBN 978-0-8014-8828-3.
- Komech, Alexei I.; Pluzhnikov, V. I., eds. (1982). Pamyatniku arhitektury Moskvy. Kremlin, Kitai Gorod, tsentralnye ploschadi (Памятники архитектуры Москвы. Кремль, Китай-город, центральные площади) (in Russian). Iskusstvo.
- Kudryavtsev, Mikhail Petrovich (2008). Moskva – trety Rim (Москва – третий Рим) (in Russian). Troitsa. OCLC 291098358. (second edition; first edition: 1991)
- Moffett, Marian; Fazio, Michael; Wodehouse, Lawrence (2003). A world history of architecture. Boston: McGraw-Hill. ISBN 978-0-07-141751-8.
- Perrie, Maureen (2002). The Image of Ivan the Terrible in Russian Folklore. Cambridge University Press. ISBN 978-0-521-89100-4.
- Petreius, Peter (1997). History of the Great Duchy of Moscow (История о великом княжестве Московском) (in Russian). Rita Print, Moscow. ISBN 978-5-89486-001-5. (Original book written in 1615 and printed in Leipzig, in German language, in 1620; translated to Russian in 1847 by Mikhail Shemyakin).
- Shchenkov, Alexei S.; Andrej Leonidovic, Batalov, eds. (2002). Pamyatniki arhitektury v dorevolutsionnoy Rossii (Памятники архитектуры в дореволюционной России) (in Russian). Moscow: Terra. ISBN 978-5-275-00664-3.
- Schmidt, Albert J. (1989). The architecture and planning of classical Moscow: a cultural history. Diane Publishing. ISBN 978-0-87169-181-1.
- Shvidkovsky, D. S. (2007). Russian architecture and the West. Yale University Press. ISBN 978-0-300-10912-2.
- Watkin, David (2005). History of Western architecture. Laurence King Publishing. ISBN 978-1-85669-459-9.
