= Petrok Maly =

Italian architect (died after 1538)

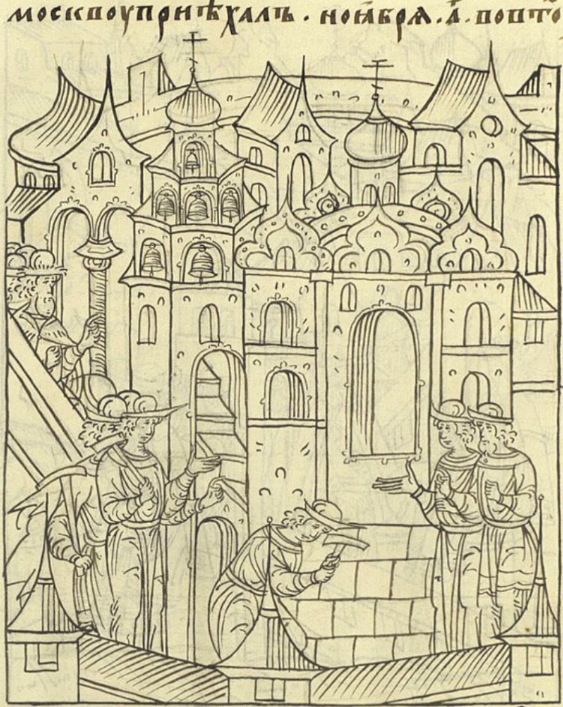
Petrok Maly constructs the Ascension Church in Kolomenskoye, miniature from the Illustrated Chronicle of Ivan the Terrible

Petrok Maly (Russian: Петрок Малый, lit. 'Peter Junior'), also known as Petrok Maly Fryazin (Russian: Петрок Малый Фрязин; died after 1538), was an Italian architect who arrived in Moscow together with the envoys of Pope Clement VII in 1528. He was the last of the Italian masters to be invited to Russia.

== Life ==
He was likely born Pietro Francesco di Annibale in Italy. He worked as an architect by the Vatican and likely lost his secure employment with the sack of Rome in 1527. The Russian embassy led by E. M. Trusov and T. S. Lodygin left for Rome in 1526; there was a demand for builders in Muscovy, and Pietro traveled there with the support of Pope Clement VII. He converted to Russian Orthodoxy around 1535. His baptism and oath of allegiance to the sovereign is mentioned in chronicles. He also owned lands near Moscow and Kolomna.

His work in Russia includes the 1532 construction of the Ascension Church in Kolomenskoye, although the true architect's identity is still contested; it is one of the earliest Russian churches showing tented roof design. In 1535, Petrok was commissioned by Russian regent Elena Glinskaya to build a 2.6 kilometres (1.6 mi) long wall (the Kitai-gorod wall) that stretched from Beklemishevskaya Tower along the Moskva River before returning to the Corner Arsenal Tower. Construction took three years.

After November 1538, there is no information about his fate. Turmoil at the royal court after the death of Elena Glinskaya led Petrok to flee to Livonia, where he told his story to the bishop of Dorpat. Russian chronicles mention that his wife remained in Moscow.

== Gallery ==
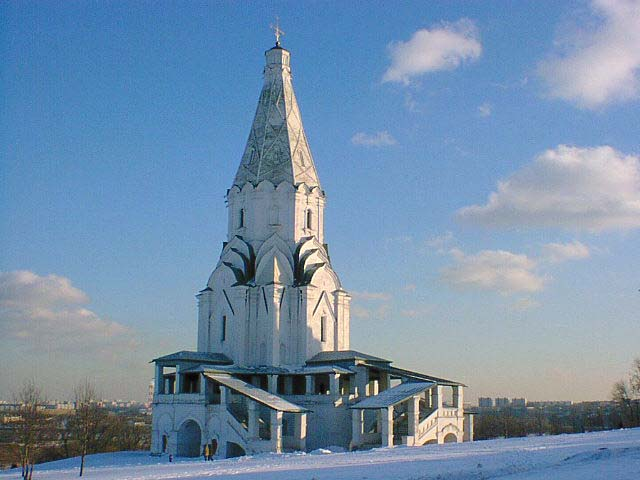
Ascension Church in Kolomenskoye, Moscow

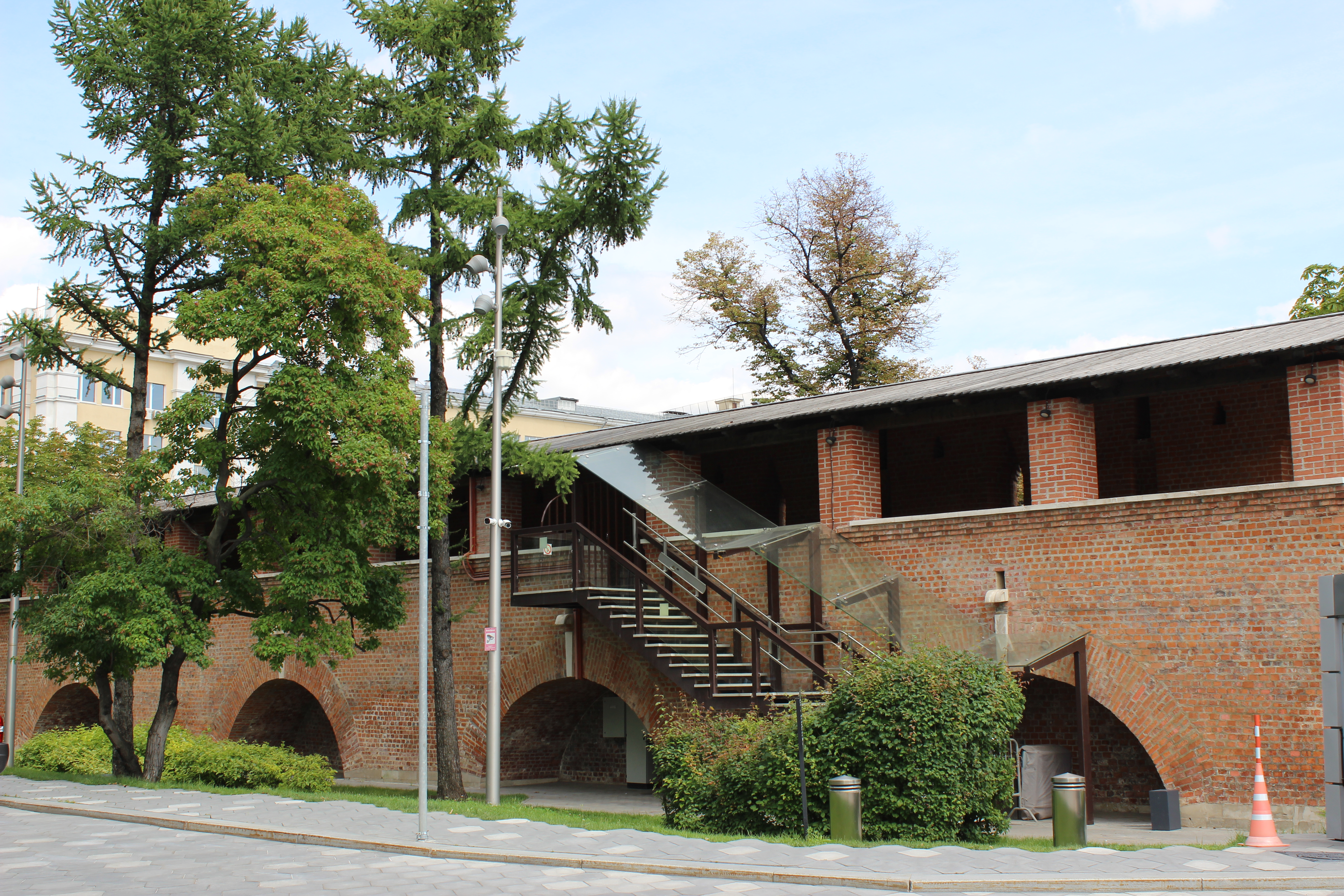
Remaining part of the Kitai-gorod wall in Zaryadye, Moscow

== Sources ==
- Galeotti, Mark (15 February 2022). The Moscow Kremlin: Russia's Fortified Heart. Bloomsbury USA. ISBN 978-1-4728-4549-8.
- Makhanko, M. A. (2019). "Петрок". Православная энциклопедия — Т. LVI: Петр Дамиани — Повечерие. Moscow: Православная энциклопедия. pp. 298–299. ISBN 978-5-89572-063-9.
- Shvidkovsky, Dmitry Olegovich (2007). Russian Architecture and the West. Yale University Press. ISBN 978-0-300-10912-2.
