= Ivan Barma =

Russian architect

Ivan Barma (Иван Барма), together with Postnik Yakovlev, was probably one of the architects and builders of Saint Basil's Cathedral on Red Square in Moscow (built between 1555 and 1560).

== Honors ==
A large 128 km wide crater on the planet Mercury is named Barma in honor of the architect.
