= Postnik Yakovlev =

16th-century Russian architect

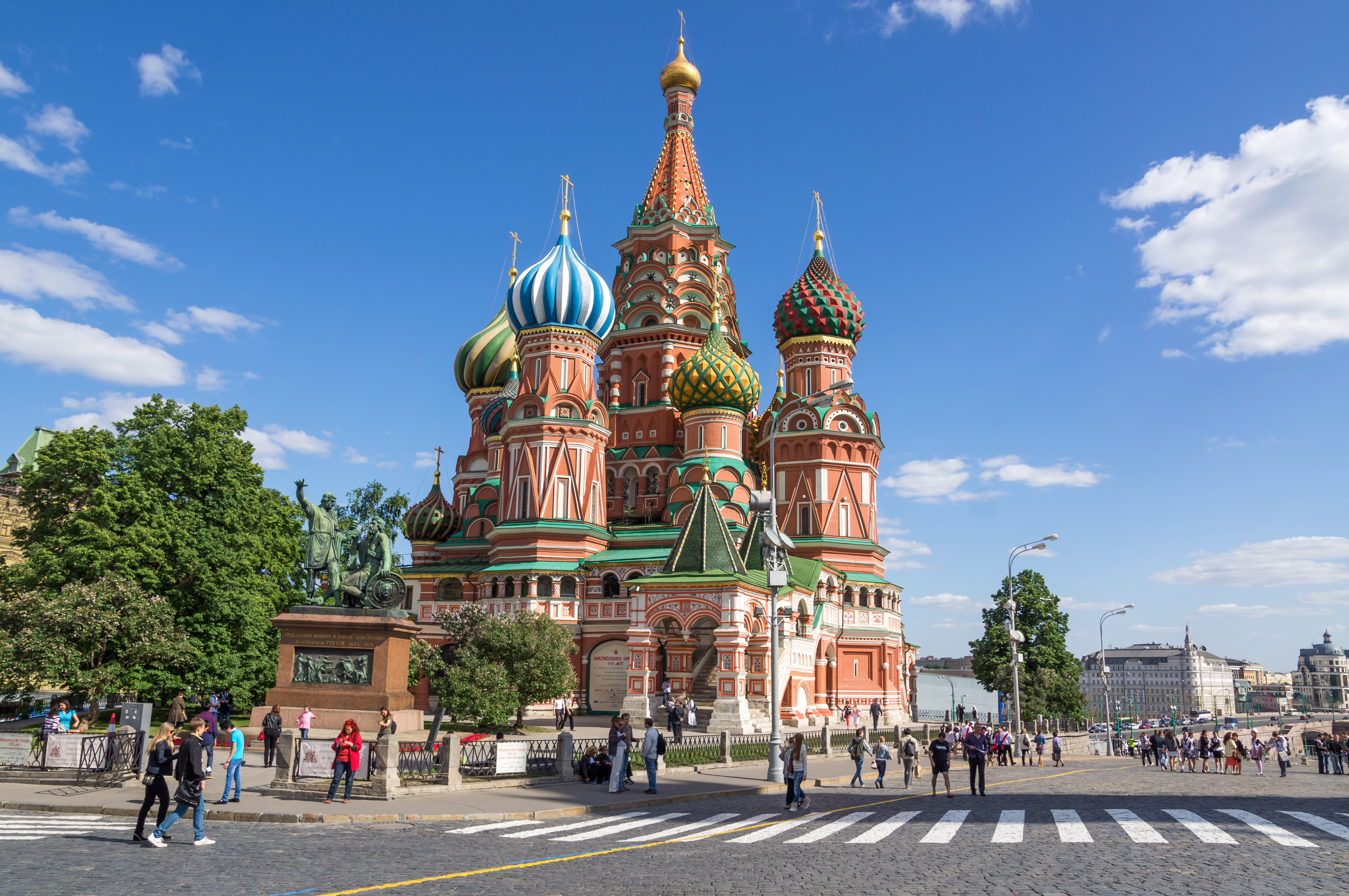
St. Basil's Cathedral

Postnik Yakovlev (Russian: Постник Яковлев; born 16th century in Pskov) was a Russian architect best known as one of the builders of the Saint Basil's Cathedral on Red Square in Moscow (built between 1555 and 1560, the other architect is Barma). It is thought that he was nicknamed "Barma" (Барма) ("the mumbler"), although it might be that his full name was, in fact, Ivan Yakovlevich Barma; (Postnik means "Faster", a term used for several religious figures, including Patriarch John IV of Constantinople); Barma might also be Yakovlev's assistant.

According to legend, Ivan the Terrible blinded Yakovlev so that he could never build anything so beautiful again. However, this is probably a myth, as Yakovlev, in cooperation with another master, Ivan Shirjay, designed the walls of the Kazan Kremlin and the Cathedral of the Annunciation in Kazan in 1561 and 1562, just after the completion of St. Basil's. He also designed the northeast chapel of St. Basil's (where Basil himself, the popular Basil Fool for Christ – Yurodivy Vassily Blazhenny – is buried), in 1588, four years after Ivan's death.

According to several historians, Yakovlev also designed churches in Staritsa, Murom, Sviazhsk, and perhaps Vladimir, although others contend that this was another architect with a similar name.
