= Barma (crater) =

Crater on Mercury

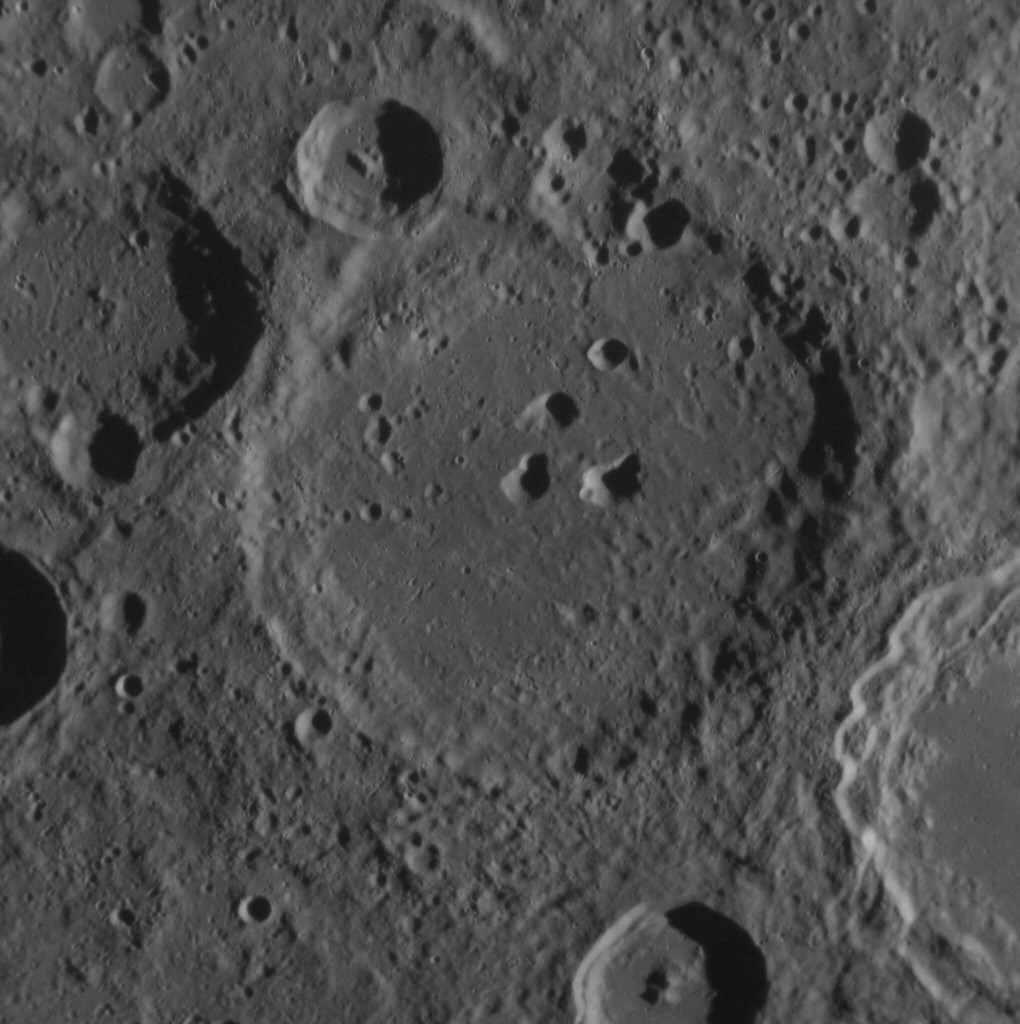
- MESSENGER image
- Feature type: Impact crater
- Location: Michelangelo quadrangle, Mercury
- Coordinates: 41.3°S 162.8°W
- Diameter: 128 km
- Eponym: Ivan Barma

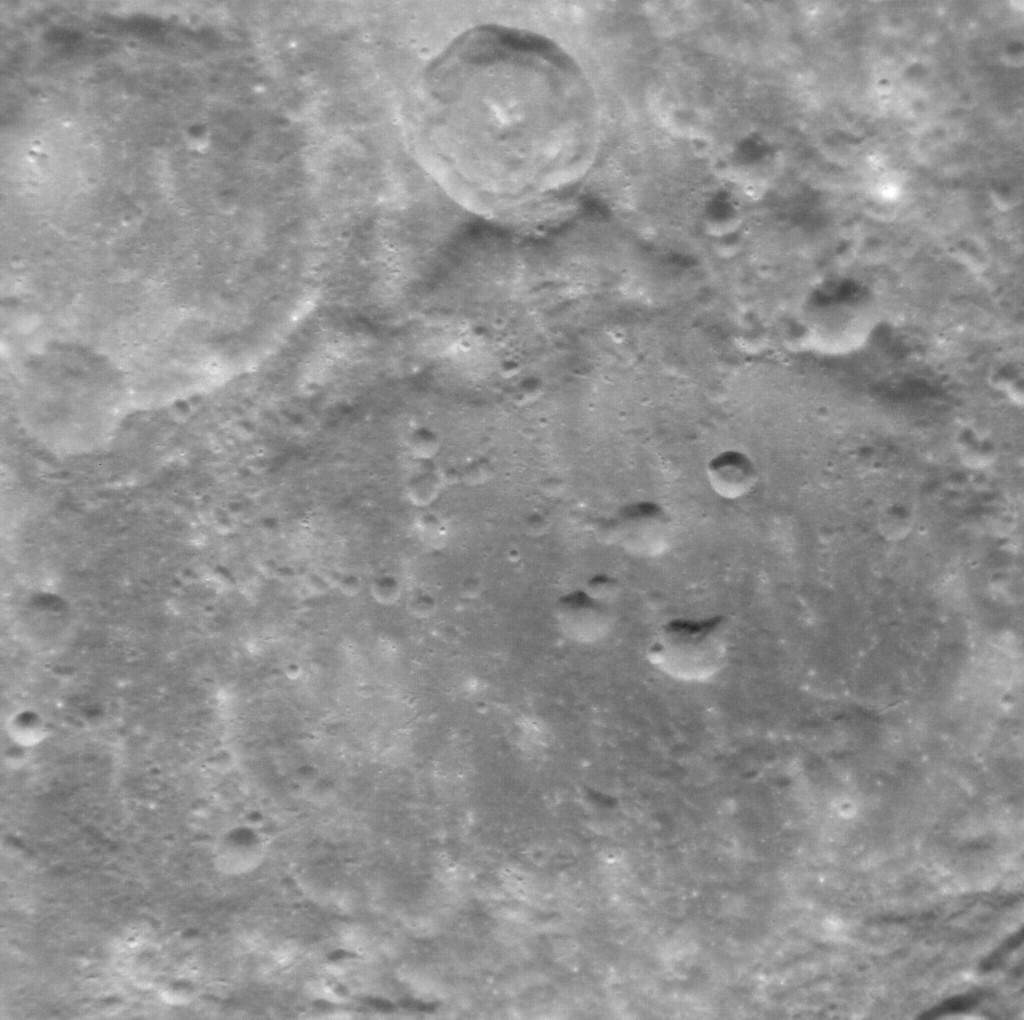
Another MESSENGER image at higher sun angle

Barma is a crater on Mercury. It has a diameter of 128 kilometers. Its name was adopted by the International Astronomical Union in 1982. Barma is named for the Russian architect Ivan Barma, who lived in the 16th century.

Barma is south of Takayoshi crater.
