= Takayoshi =

- Gender: Male

Origin
- Origin: Japanese
- Meaning: Different meanings depending on the kanji used

Takayoshi (written: 孝允, 孝佳, 孝義, 孝悦, 高兆, 高義, 高吉, 隆儀, 隆義, 隆徳, 隆至, 貴義, 將能, 賢良 or 崇兆) is a masculine Japanese given name. Notable people with the name include:

- Takayoshi Amma (安間 貴義) (born 1969), Japanese footballer and manager
- Daikirin Takayoshi (大麒麟 將能) (1942–2010), Japanese sumo wrestler
- Hineno Takayoshi (日根野 高吉) (1539–1600), Japanese samurai
- Kyōgoku Takayoshi (京極 高吉) (1508–1581), Japanese samurai
- Takayoshi Ishihara (石原 崇兆) (born 1992), Japanese footballer
- Takayoshi Kajikawa (梶川 孝義; born 1934), Japanese swimmer
- Takayoshi Kawabata (川端 崇義; born 1985), Japanese baseball player
- Takayoshi Kawagoe (川越 孝悦) (born 1949), Japanese long jumper
- Kido Takayoshi (木戸 孝允) (1833–1877), Japanese samurai and politician
- Takayoshi Nagamine (長嶺 高兆) (1945–2012), Japanese karateka
- Takayoshi Ohmura (大村 孝佳) (born 1983), Japanese musician
- Takayoshi Ono (小野 隆儀) (born 1978), Japanese footballer
- Takayoshi Shikida (式田 高義) (born 1977), Japanese footballer
- Takayoshi Taniguchi (谷口 隆義) (born 1949), Japanese politician
- Takayoshi Tanimoto (谷本 貴義) (born 1975), Japanese singer
- Takayoshi Toda (戸田 賢良) (born 1979), Japanese footballer
- Takayoshi Yamano (山野 孝義) (born 1955), Japanese footballer
- Takayoshi Eguchi (江口 孝義) (born 1955), Japanese baseball player
- Takayoshi Yoshioka (吉岡 隆徳) (1909–1984), Japanese sprinter
- Takayoshi Kano (加納 隆至) (1938–), Japanese primatologist
- Takayoshi Matsushita (松下 和幹) (1953–), Japanese archer
