= Beklemishevskaya Tower =

Tower at the Eastern edge of Moscow Kremlin Wall

Coordinates: 55°44′59″N 37°37′24″E

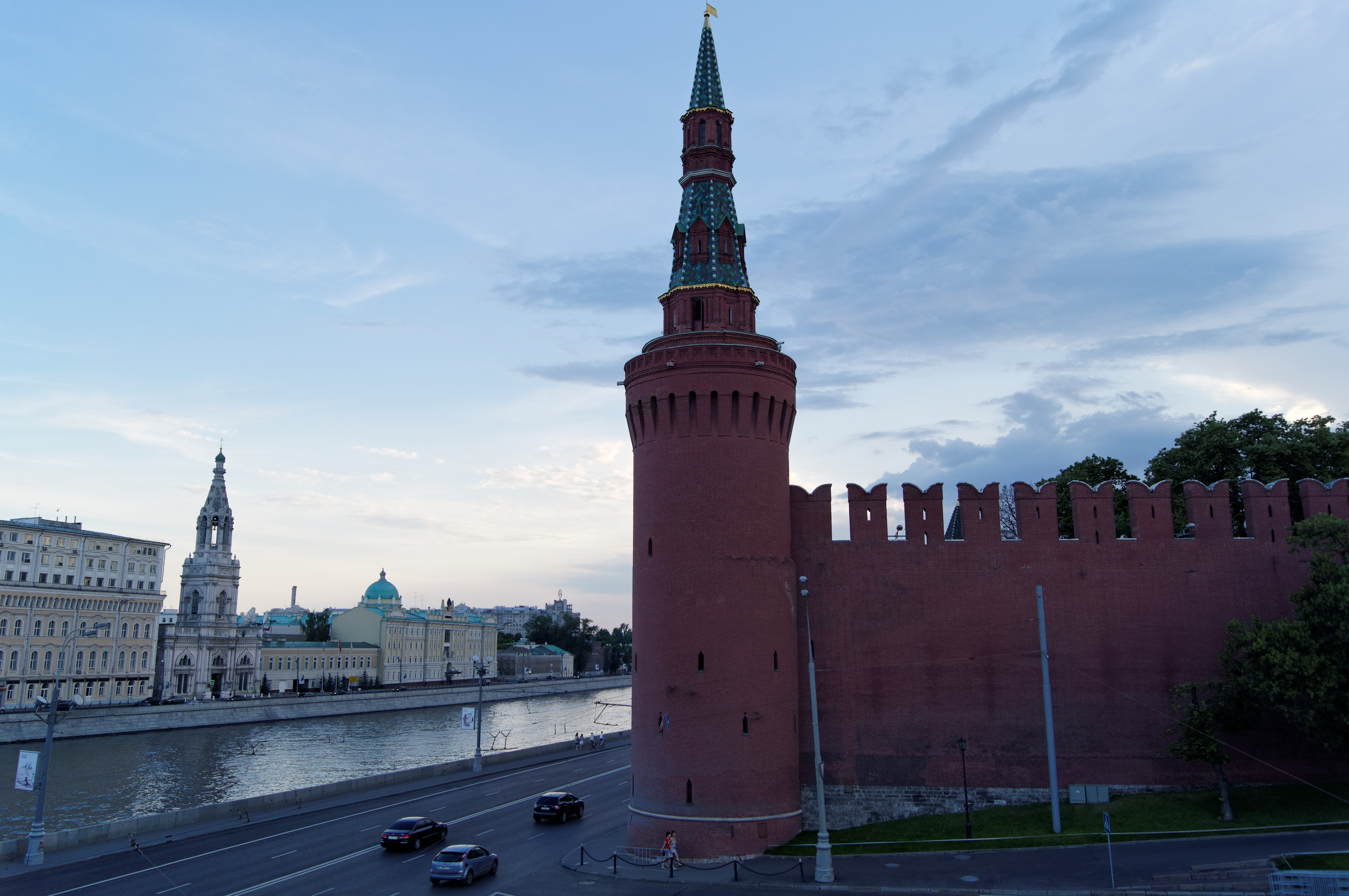
Beklemishevskaya Tower

Beklemishevskaya Tower (Russian: Беклемишевская) is a tower at the Eastern edge of Moscow Kremlin Wall. It was named after a boyar Ivan Bersen-Beklemishev, whose house had been adjacent to the tower from the Kremlin side. It was earlier known as Russian: Москворецкая tower based its position on the near Moskva River. It is similar to the other two towers standing at the other corners of the Kremlin triangle, Vodovzvodnaya and Uglovaya Arsenalnaya rowers. While these towers are cylindrical, all other towers of the Kremlin's Wall have been built on a square plan base.

== Description ==
This is a 46.2 meter high cylindrical tower with four floors and widely spaced narrow windows. The upper floor is a defensive position with openings at the planking of the mâchicoulis for firing downwards. The tower is topped with an octagonal upper building with louvers and a weather vane.

== History ==
It was erected in 1487-88 as part of the reinforcement of the Kremlin's reserve lines. It was built in place of an earlier fortification following the plans of the Italian architect Marco Ruffo. While it is sometimes considered the only tower on the wall of the Kremlin that has not changed substantially over the preceding centuries, it has also been suggested that it was destroyed by the forces of Napoleon and rebuilt subsequently. Only minor repairs were carried out during the 20th century. The roof was replaced with copperplates in 1973.

== Further information ==
- Анисимов Н.А. Расстрел Московского Кремля.. — М.: Столица, 1995. — 85 с. — ISBN 5-7055-1147-7.
- Бартенев С. П. Московский Кремль в старину и теперь. — М.: Синодальная типография, 1912. — 259 с.
- Бродский Б. Сокровища Москвы. — М.: Изобразительное искусство, 1990. — 376 с. — ISBN 5-85200-163-5.
- Воротникова И. А., Неделин В.М. Кремли, крепости и укрепленные монастыри русского государства XV-XVII веков. Крепости Центральной России.. — М.: БуксМАрт, 2013. — 887 с.
- По Москве. Прогулки по Москве и ее художественным и просветительным учреждениям / Геника Н. Я.. — М.: Изд. М. и С. Сабашниковых, 1917. — 672 с.
- Гончарова А. А. Стены и башни Кремля. — М.: Московский рабочий, 1980. — 96 с.
- Девятов С. В., Жиляев В. И., Кайкова О. К. Московский Кремль в годы Великой Отечественной войны. — М.: Кучково поле, 2010. — 332 с.
- Евдокимов Д. В. Кремль и Красная площадь. — М.: ИТРК, 2003. — 272 с. — ISBN 5-88010-160-6.
- Земцов С. М. Архитекторы Москвы второй половины XV и первой половины XVI века // Зодчие Москвы. — Московский рабочий, 1981. — С. 59–68.
- Всеобщая история архитектуры в 12 томах. Т.VI Архитектура России, Украины и Белоруссии XIV - перв. пол. XIX вв / Колли Н. Я.. — М., 1968. — Т. 6. — 569 с.
- Колодный Л. Е. Путешествие в свой город. — М.: Московский рабочий, 1981. — 368 с.
- Малиновский А. Ф. Обозрение Москвы. — М.: Московский рабочий, 1992. — ISBN 5-239-01340-3.
- Романов К.К. Рецензия на книгу Бартенева «Московский Кремль в старину и теперь». — СПб., 1914. — 18 с.
- Романюк С. Сердце Москвы. От Кремля до Белого города.. — М.: Центрполиграф, 2013. — 912 с. — ISBN 978-5-227-04778-6.
- Рябчиков Е.И. Красная площадь. — М., 1980. — 240 с.
- Шевченко В.Н. Повседневная жизнь Кремля при президентах.. — М.: Молодая гвардия, 2005. — 292 с.
- Фабрициус М.П. История московского Кремля. — М.: АСТ, 2007. — 410 с.
- Яковлева О. Тайны московских подземелий. — М.: БММ, 2014. — 240 с. — ISBN 978-5-88353-602-0.
- Янцева Л. И. Вокруг Кремля и Китай-Города. ПутеБродитель. — М.: Центрполиграф, 2016. — 478 с. — ISBN 978-5-227-05560-6.
