= Khorovod =

East Slavic and pagan circle dance and chorus singing

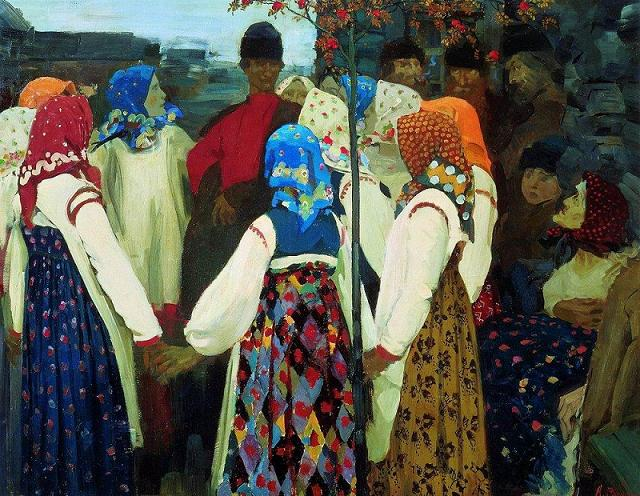
A young man breaking into a girls' khorovod, from a 1902 painting by Andrei Ryabushkin

The khorovod or horovod (Note: Russian: хоровод, IPA: [xərɐˈvot], Ukrainian: хоровод, romanized: khorovod or коло, kolo, Belarusian: карагод [karaˈɣot], Polish: korowód) (Russian: хоровод, Ukrainian: хоровод, корогод, Polish: korowód) is the Slavic name for a folk dance combining circle dance and chorus singing, similar to the choreia of ancient Greece.

== Etymology ==
The term khorovod likely descends from the Greek Choreia (Ancient Greek: χορεία); Rus' culture was heavily influenced by Greek culture. Khorovod is related to choreia ( a Greek circle dance), kolo (a South Slavic circle dance originating in Serbia, Croatia and Bosnia), hora (Balkans), and kochari (Armenian and Azerbaijani folk dance).

== Origin and characteristics ==
The participants of the dance hold the hand or the little finger of their dance partners while dancing in a circle.

== See also ==
- Hora (dance)
- Kolo (dance)
- Bulgarian dances
