= Choreia =

Ancient Greek circle dance accompanied by singing

Choreia (Ancient Greek: χορεία, romanized: choreía) is a circle dance accompanied by singing (see Greek chorus, choros), in ancient Greece. Homer refers to this dance in his epic poem, the Iliad.

Terms descended from Greek choreia that are used for circle dances in a number of other countries are:

- horon, in Turkey
- khorovod (хоровод), in Russia
- khora (хора), in Ukraine
- hora, in Romania and Moldova
- horo (хоро), in Bulgaria
- oro (оро), in North Macedonia and Montenegro

== See also ==
- Rasa lila
- Greek dance
- Tanabata
