= Culture of Kievan Rus' =

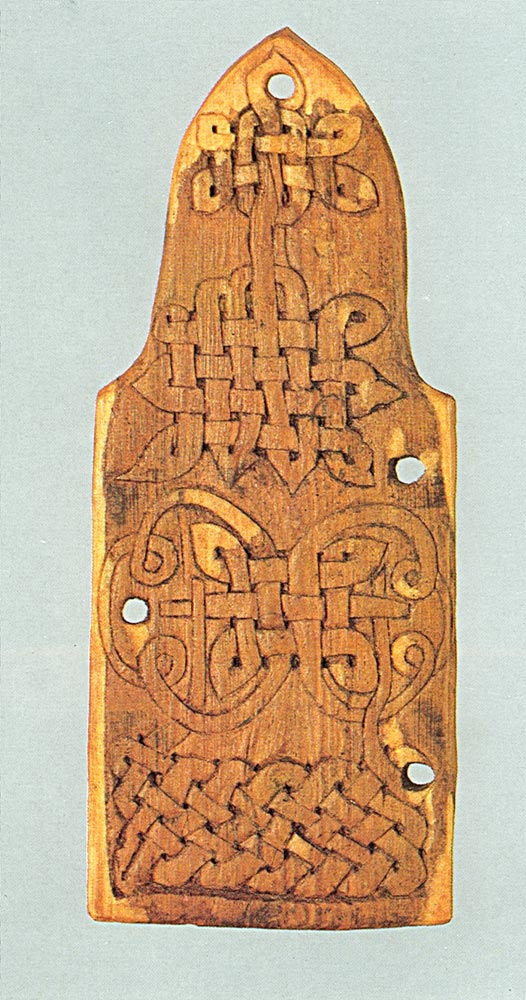
Cera (a tablet for teaching literacy) with a carved Rus' ornament. The reverse side. Novgorod. 12th century.

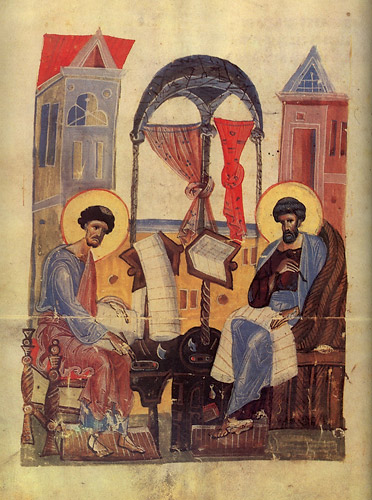
A miniature from the Spassky Gospels, Yaroslavl, made in the 1220s

The culture of Kievan Rus' spans the cultural developments in Kievan Rus' from the 9th to 13th century of the Middle Ages. The Kievan monarchy came under the sphere of influence of the Byzantine Empire, one of the most advanced cultures of the time, and adopted Christianity during the Christianization of Kievan Rus'. After the gradual fragmentation of the dynasty into many Rus' principalities in the 13th century, Kievan Rus' culture faded with the Mongol invasion in the 13th century, and Batu Khan's establishment of the Golden Horde as the regional hegemon of Eastern Europe.

== Architecture ==
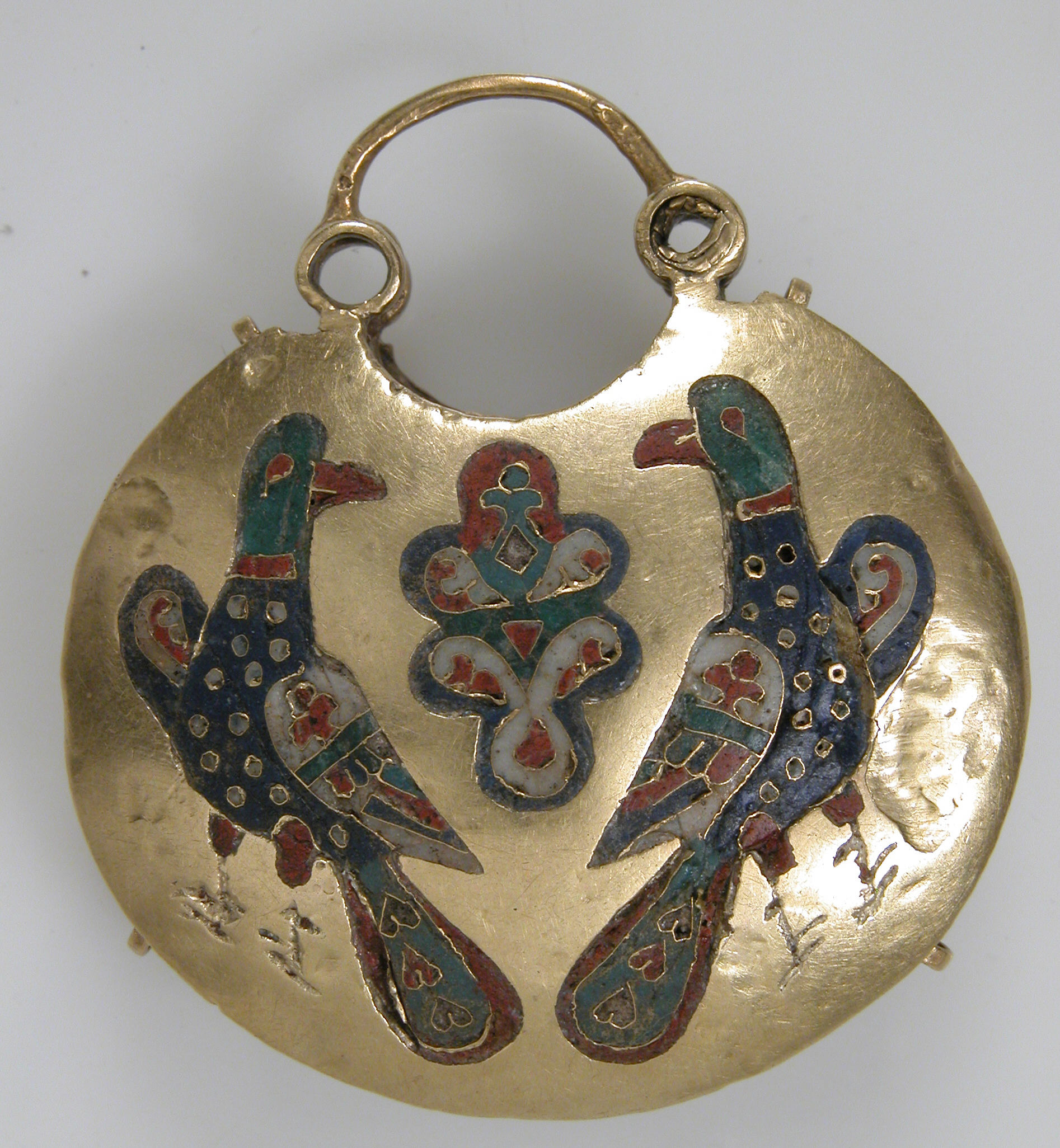
Kolt with two birds flanking a tree of life; 11th–12th century; cloisonné enamel & gold; overall: 5.4 x 4.8 x 1.5 cm (2 1/8 x 1 7/8 x 9/16 in.); made in Kiev (Ukraine); Metropolitan Museum of Art (New York City)

Architecture was exemplified by Byzantine masters building their first cathedrals in the realm, and decorating their interiors with mosaics and murals. Samples of pictorial art, such as icons and miniatures of illuminated manuscripts, came to Kiev and other cities from Constantinople. The most important cathedral of Kievan Rus' became Saint Sophia Cathedral in Kiev, named after the principal cathedral of the Byzantine capital, the Hagia Sophia.

== Religion ==
The study of the pagan culture of the Early East Slavs is based on excavations. One of the finds was the Zbruch Idol, a stone figure of a deity with four faces. Dobrynya and the Dragon was one of the monuments of epic literature of Rus’.

This new cultural era dates back to the Christianization of Kievan Rus’ in 989, when the principalities of Kievan Rus' came under the sphere of influence of the Byzantine Empire, one of the most advanced cultures of the time. Vladimir the Great's political choice determined the subsequent development of the Rus’ culture.

The metropolitan Hilarion of Kiev wrote his work Sermon on Law and Grace in the mid-11th century, confirming the basics of Kievan Rus' new Christian world outlook. Nevertheless, the text mentions the non-Christian, pagan, shamanistic Turkic title of khagan (Old East Slavic: каганъ, romanized: kaganŭ) throughout the text, a total of five times, and applies it to both Vladimir the Great, r. 980–1015), and his son Georgij, baptismal name of Yaroslav the Wise (r. 1019–1054). Scholar Charles J. Halperin (1987) agreed with Peter B. Golden (1982) that this reflected Khazar influence on Kievan Rus', and argued that the use of a "steppe title" in Kiev 'may be the only case of the title's use by a non-nomadic people'. Halperin also found it "highly anomalous" that a Christian prelate like Hilarion would 'laud his ruler with a shamanist title', adding in 2022: "The Christian ethos of the sermon is marred by Ilarion's attribution to Vladimir of the Khazar title kagan, which was definitely not Christian."

The metropolitan of Kiev was subordinated to the Patriarch of Constantinople. The Rus' principalities adopted the Byzantine culture during a time when the apogee of the Eastern Roman Empire had already been overcome, but its decline was still far ahead. Byzantium remained the only direct successor of the Hellenistic world, which had applied the artistic achievements of antiquity to the spiritual experience of Christianity. Byzantine culture differed from the rest of the world by its refined taste and sophistication. Byzantine art differed in the depth of religious substance and virtuosity of formal methods. The principal achievement of Byzantine theology was the ecclesiastic writings of the holy fathers. The high cultural level of Greek teachers posed difficult tasks for Kievan Rus'.

Nevertheless, art of the Rus' principalities of the tenth century differed from Byzantine prototypes of the same period. The peculiarities of the first Rus' works of art, created by the "visiting" Greeks, included a magnitude and representativeness which demonstrated the ambitions of the young Rus' state and its princely authority. Byzantine influence, however, couldn't spread quickly over the enormous territory of Rus' lands, and their Christianization would take several centuries. For example, there were numerous pagan uprisings in the principalities of Suzdal and Rostov until the twelfth century, led by the volkhvy (pagan priests).

There are different concepts on the correlation of Christianity and pagan beliefs among the East Slavs. Among them is the concept of a "double faith", the coexistence and mutual penetration of two religions—the "popular" and the "official". Popular culture has long been defined by pagan beliefs, especially in the remote regions of Kievan Rus'. Subsequently, it was defined by a simplified interpretation of Christianity and by superstitions, similar to what had happened in Western European culture. However, Russian historians' idea of the popular culture after Christianization is primarily based on indirect data and suppositions. At the same time, the culture of the ecclesiastical and secular elite is known for its monuments, which do not allow historians to make confident conclusions on pagan penetration of religious beliefs of Medieval Rus'. Historians prefer to speak of a parallel development of popular and "elitist" cultures. They certainly give credit to the earlier traditions of the Early East Slavs and Finnic peoples without, however, overestimating their significance in forming elements of the culture.

== Ornament ==
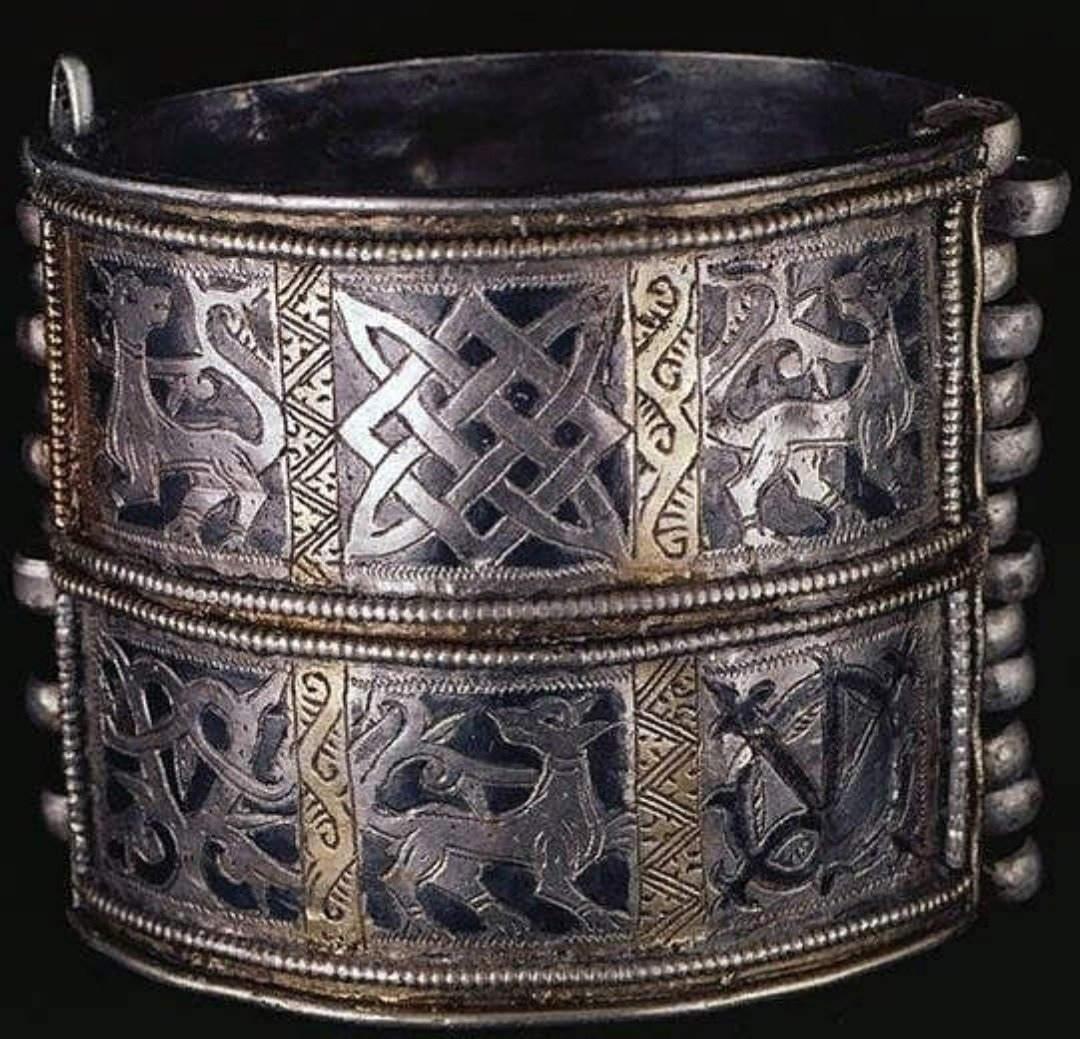
Silver bracelet with Kievan Rus' animal ornament from the treasure in Staraya Ryazan, second half of the 12th century

Kievan Rus' ornament is a general designation for ornamental patterns characteristic of the culture of Kievan Rus', and partially rooted in its pre-Christian period. There was also influence outside Kievan Rus', in particular in Poland, Moravia and Scandinavia (see “§ Outside Kievan Rus'”).

== Literature ==
Though the Rus' had significant contact with the Byzantine Empire and chose to have various parts of the Bible translated from the Greek into Church Slavonic, they did not seem to be interested in other cultural resources that contact with Constantinople would have provided them. That is, although the Rus would have had access to the vast libraries of Greek philosophy, mathematics, and science housed there; there is no evidence that they translated any of these into Slavonic. Since access to these same documents is what is most often cited as giving rise to the Renaissance in Western Europe, this indifference on the part of the Rus' seems to fly in the face of the argument that it was the Mongol invasions which caused Russia to "miss" the Renaissance. D. S. Likhachev notes that "the 'intelligentsia' of Kievan possessed very great mobility, and constantly traveled from principality to principality. Bands of builders, fresco-painters, and churchmen were continually moving from one principality to another, even in the years immediately following the Tatar-Mongol invasion".

With the adoption of Christianity, the principalities of the Rus' became part of a book culture. Although written language had been in use in the Rus’ lands for quite some time, it was only after the baptism of the Rus' that written language spread throughout the principalities. The development of the local literary language was associated with Christianity, and strongly influenced by Old Church Slavonic. An abundance of translated literature laid the foundation for the development of Russia's own writing traditions. At its early stages, the most typical genres were sermons, lives of the saints (for example, Life of Boris and Gleb), descriptions of military campaigns (the famous Tale of Igor's Campaign), and compositions of chronicles (Primary Chronicle).

== Philosophy ==
A defining feature of thinkers in Kievan Rus' was its moral and ethical orientation. They posited that moral law derives from God’s act of creation, explored the concepts of sin and human moral responsibility, and asserted that through human actions, the world could be improved and cleansed of evil. The exploration of the concept of holiness also played a significant role in the ethical thought of Kievan Rus'.

Concurrently, an anthropocentric understanding of the universe took shape. The human being was viewed as the master of nature: standing above the natural Cosmos, which had been created to serve human needs and as the central link facilitating communication between God and the world. https://kpeklntu.at.ua/e-book/philosofija/page31.html

== Bibliography ==
- Franklin, Simon (1991). "Ilarion's "Sermon on Law and Grace"". Sermons and Rhetoric of Kievan Rus' (PDF). University of Toronto (SLA 218 Ukrainian Literature and Culture). p. 30.
- Halperin, Charles J. (1987). Russia and the Golden Horde: The Mongol Impact on Medieval Russian History. p. 222. ISBN 9781850430575. (e-book).
- Halperin, Charles J. (2022). The Rise and Demise of the Myth of the Rus' Land (PDF). Leeds: Arc Humanities Press. p. 107. ISBN 9781802700565.
- Ostrowski, Donald (2018). "The Return of the Rhos". Canadian-American Slavic Studie. 52 (2–3): 290–311. doi:10.1163/22102396-05202009. S2CID 195449155.
- Vasilievna, Nikolaeva Tatyana (1978). Древняя Русь и славяне [Old Rus' and Slavs] (in Russian). Moscow: Nauka, =USSR Academy of Sciences, Institute of Archeology. p. 447.
