= Piatnytska Church, Chernihiv =

Coordinates: 51°29′33″N 31°18′03″E

Piatnytska Church
- П'ятницька церква
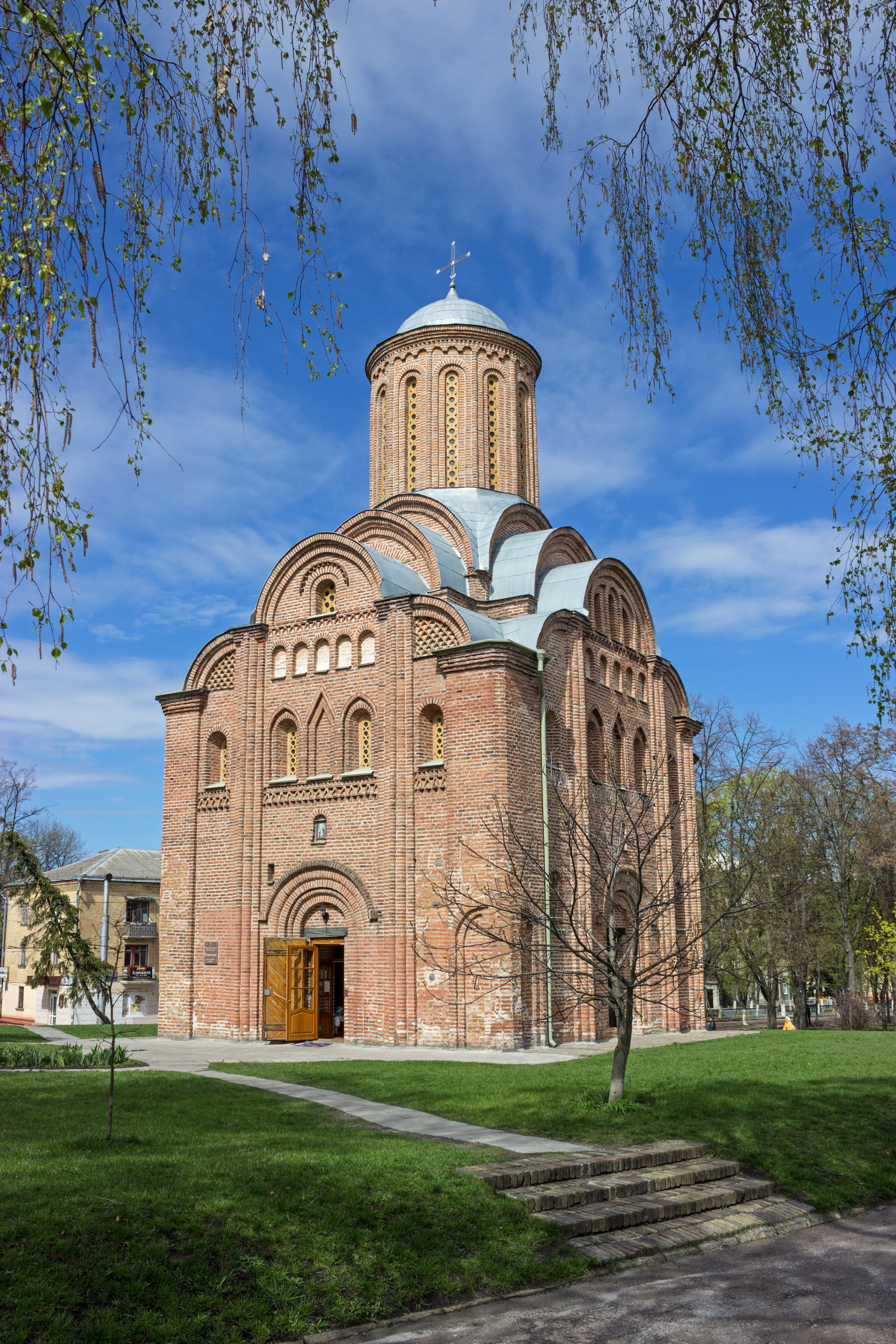

Religion
- Affiliation: Eastern Orthodox Church
- District: Orthodox Church of Ukraine

Location
- Location: Chernihiv, Ukraine
- Interactive map of Piatnytska Church

Architecture
- Type: Church
- Style: Kievan Rus' (original), Ukrainian Baroque (17th–20th centuries)
- Completed: the end of the 12th century – beginning of the 13th century

Immovable Monument of National Significance of Ukraine
- Official name: П’ятницька церква (Piatnytska Church)
- Type: Architecture
- Reference no.: 250047

Piatnytska (St. Paraskeva) Сhurch (Ukrainian: П'ятницька (святої Параскеви) церква) is a functioning church in Chernihiv, Ukraine.

== History ==
Piatnytska Church was built at the end of the 12th century – beginning of the 13th century at Chernihiv public sale area. It is a four-pillar, one-dome, square church. It differed from other Chernihiv churches by completion and decoration of the facades with all types of architectural ornaments and by composition of arches under the drum.

It was restored in 1670 and 1690s by costs of Chernihiv colonel V. Dunyn-Borkovskyi in the Ukrainian Baroque style.In the 17th–18th centuries there was a nunnery in the church, which was burned out in 1750.In 1820s a two-storeyed belfry (the architect is A. Kartashevskyi) was built, which was dismantled in 1962.In 1943 the church was destroyed.It was restored in 1962 according to the project of Petro Baranovskyi in somewhat changed style similar to Russian churches (in particular the dome). The fate of this monument is unusual. The small Piatnytska Church stood on the public sale area of Chernihiv (Paraskeva Piatnytsia has been long since considered as the trade patron saint). High dome, numerous stucco moulding, elegant proportions of the church – all these features undoubtedly gave grounds to attribute the building to Ukrainian baroque style of the 17th–18th centuries. The only unusual feature was its centric projection composition. Researchers asserted that the forms of a Kievan Rus' building were hidden under the baroque clothes.

In 1943 a Soviet bomb hit the building. The prominent Soviet researcher of Kievan Rus' architecture Pyotr Baranovsky arrived at Chernihiv in December 1943: "It was me who happened to accompany him and take part in inspections of Chernihiv buildings. The picture which revealed in front of us was terrible: only ruins remained of Piatnytska Church, rising lonely above the covered with snow wasted grounds of the city destroyed by the fascist invaders." The investigation of the monument gave unexpected results. The church did not resemble all the known ancient Rus' buildings. Everything attested that this monument was of a new architectural style which was formed in Rus' at the end of the 12th century, at the time of «The Word to the Honour of Prince's Igor Regiment».

It is known that at that time the Kievan Rus' cities went out on the historical arena. Craftsmanship and trade were rapidly developing there, industrial and trade corporations were organized. That is to say that the social and economic process was taking place, which caused the development of gothic architectural style in Europe.

== Architecture ==
During 10 years Pyotr Baranovsky restored Piatnytska Church, carefully putting a brick to a brick. As a result, he managed to reproduce with great authenticity all the shapes of the building – one of the most prominent monuments of Kievan Rus' architecture. The following investigations discovered a lot of other buildings of this architectural style. The elegant Piatnytska Church stands in the centre of the ancient Ukrainian city of Chernihiv behind the city theater, in the middle of a picturesque public garden where Chernihiv sale area was located long ago. The church is small in size (planned dimensions are 16 to 11.5 m), with four octahedral pillars inside, with three apsides and a high dome. It is exceptionally well-proportioned, with an unprecedentedly refined and harmonious composition. Unlike the static forms of previous times buildings, the composition of Piatnytska Church is dynamic, its walls steeply grow upwards with three rows of arches above the main capacity. Verticality of the building is emphasized by the profiled pilasters. Vertical and curvilinear elements which predominate in the composition are balanced by horizontal storeys of the first floor windows, by the passes of decorative niches of different forms and scales, by meander-line frieze which reminds of the architecture of the 11th century, and the reticulated decorative design on apsides. The vertical profiled pilasters on different heights are completed with short but energetic strokes of cornices. Pink color of the walls is combined with the white stuccoed areas of decorative niches and multicoloured decorative ornaments on the portals. Inside the church reminds of a tower. The artistic effect of the fresco painting is emphasized with a multicoloured floor of yellow, green and maroon glazed tiles. In Piatnytska Church everything is built according to one style, unlike Saint Sofia Cathedral of Kyiv, where the composition is developed into an entire symphony. Piatnytska Church in Chernihiv is sometimes called «The Word to the Honour of Prince's Igor Regiment» in architecture.

== Gallery ==
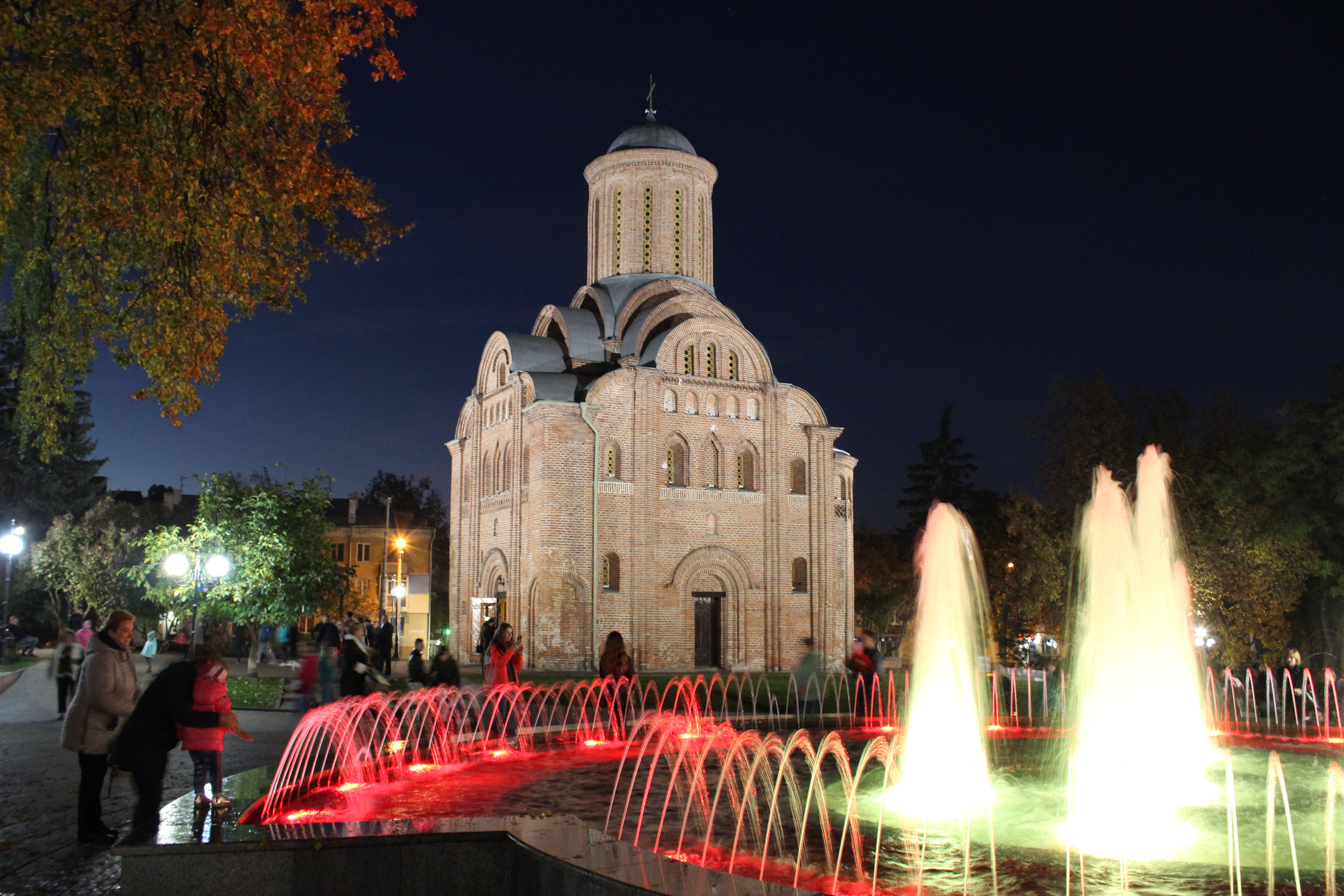

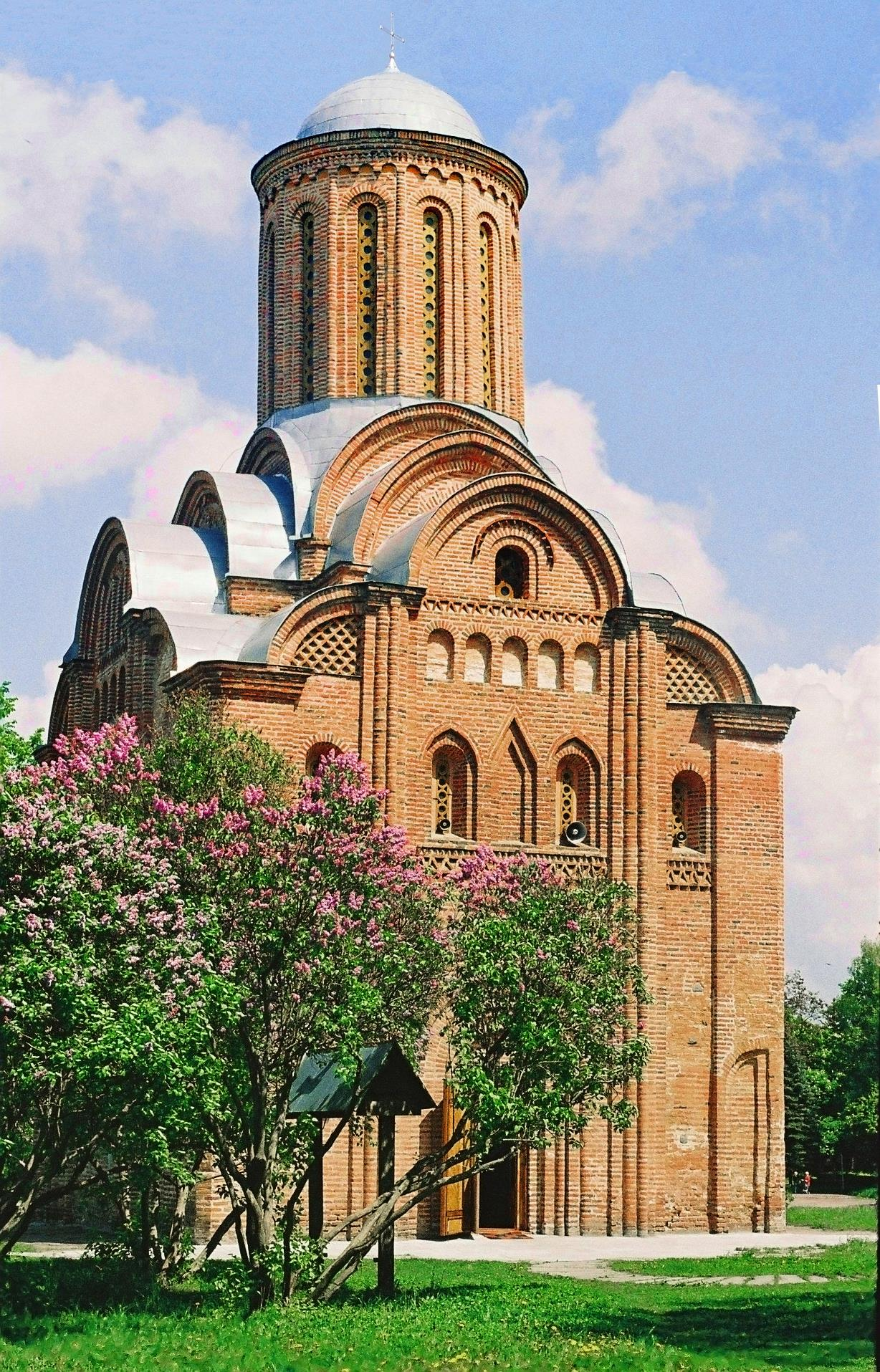

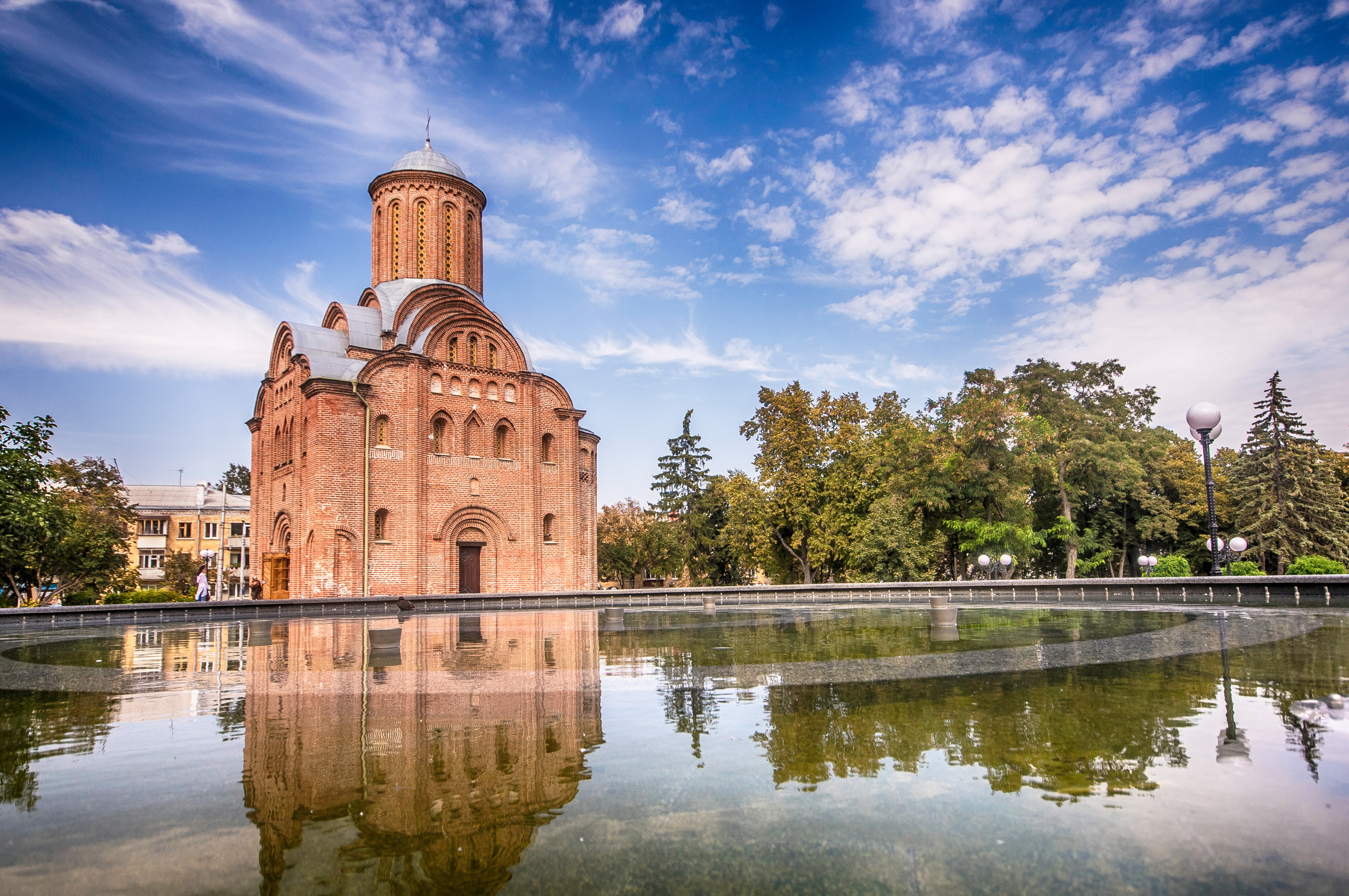

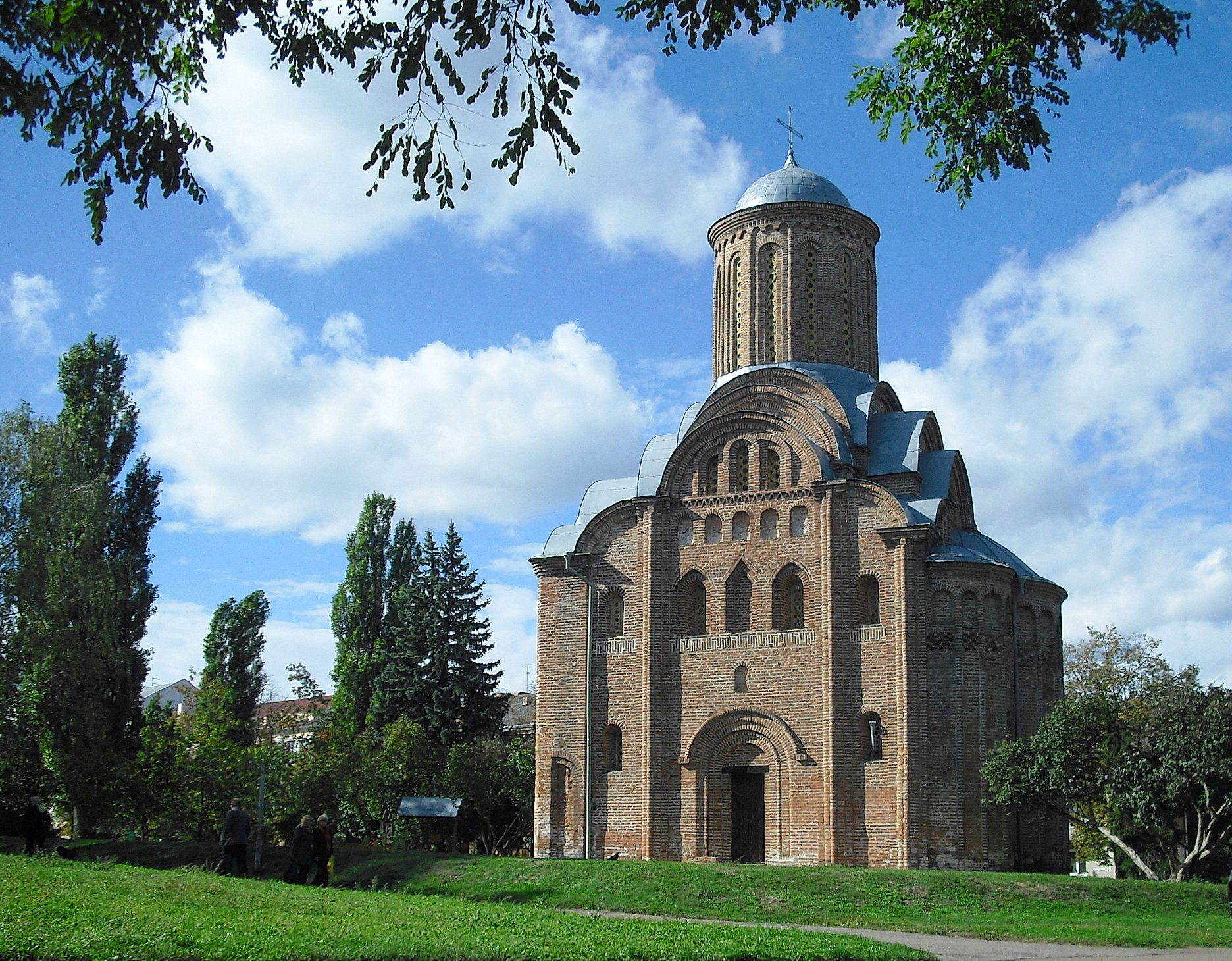

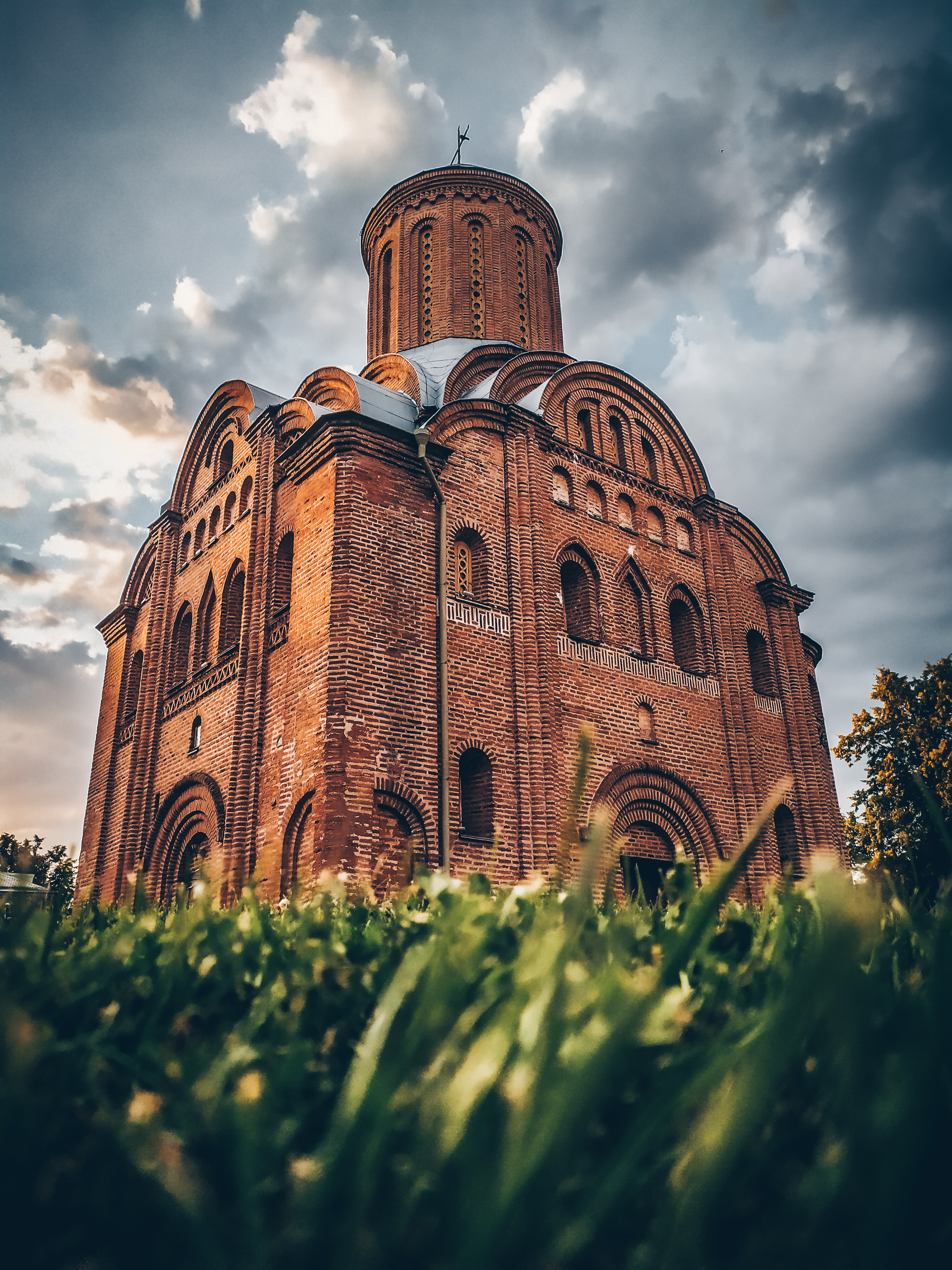

== See also ==
- List of Churches and Monasteries in Chernihiv
