= Architecture in Kievan Rus' =

Overview article

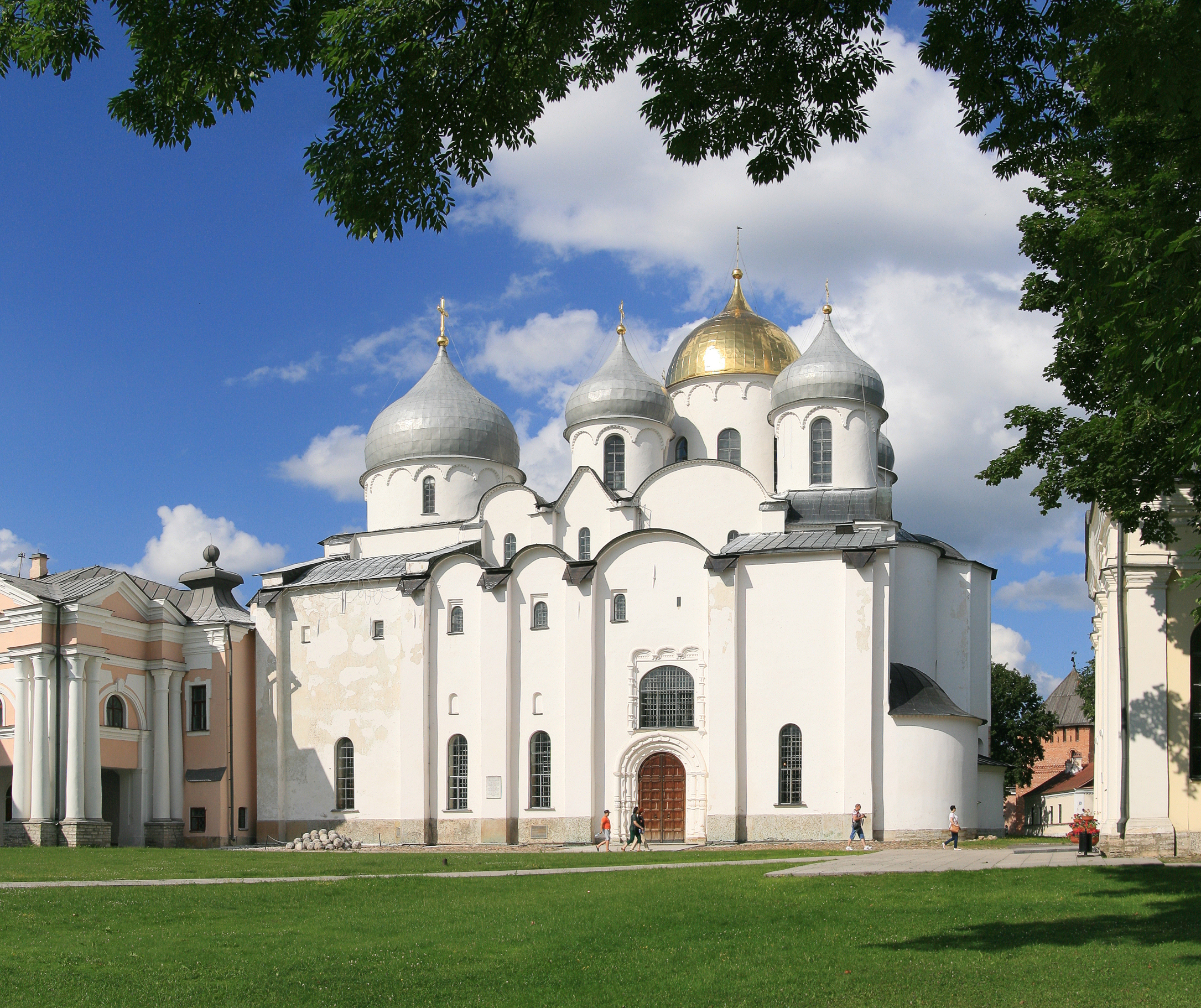
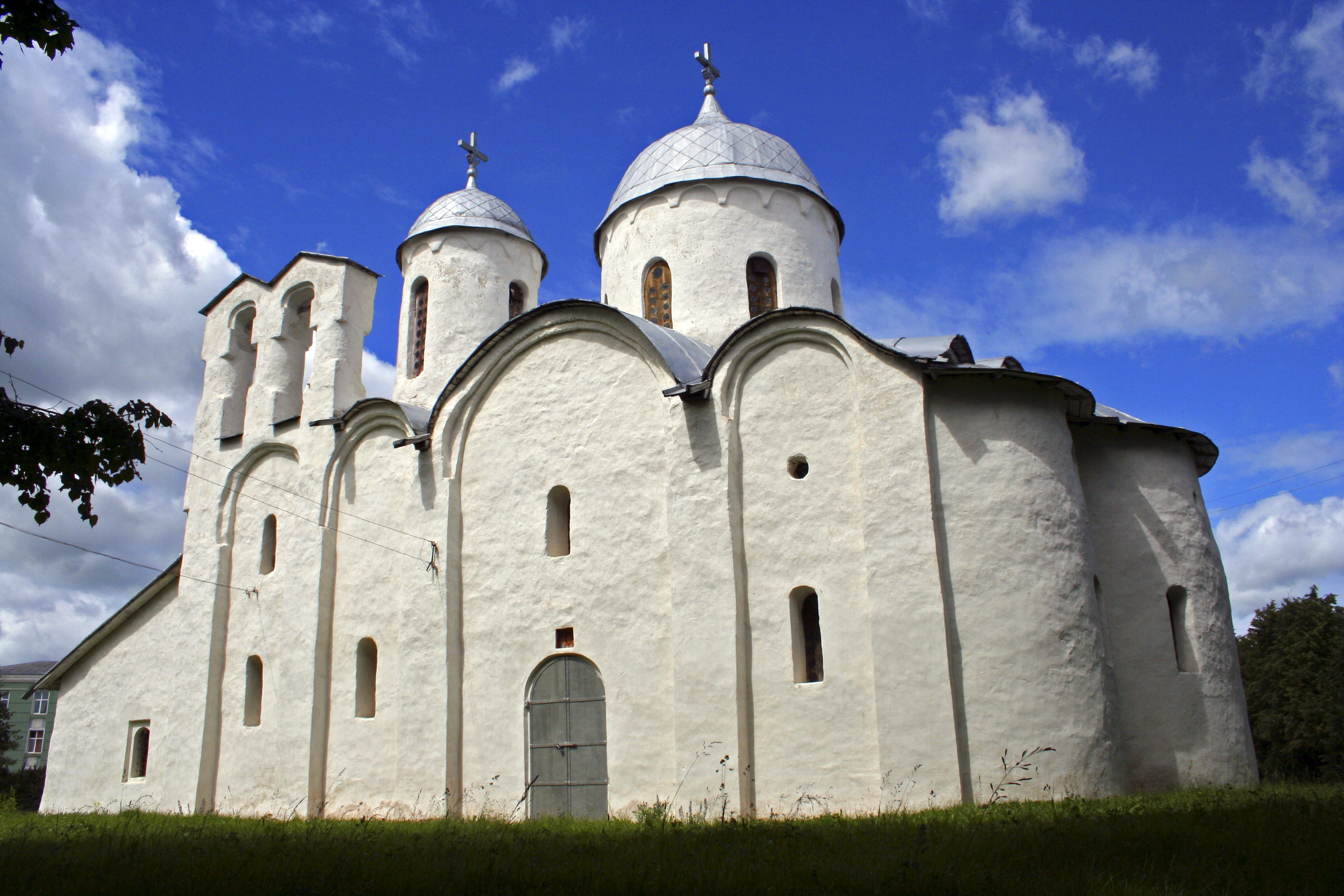
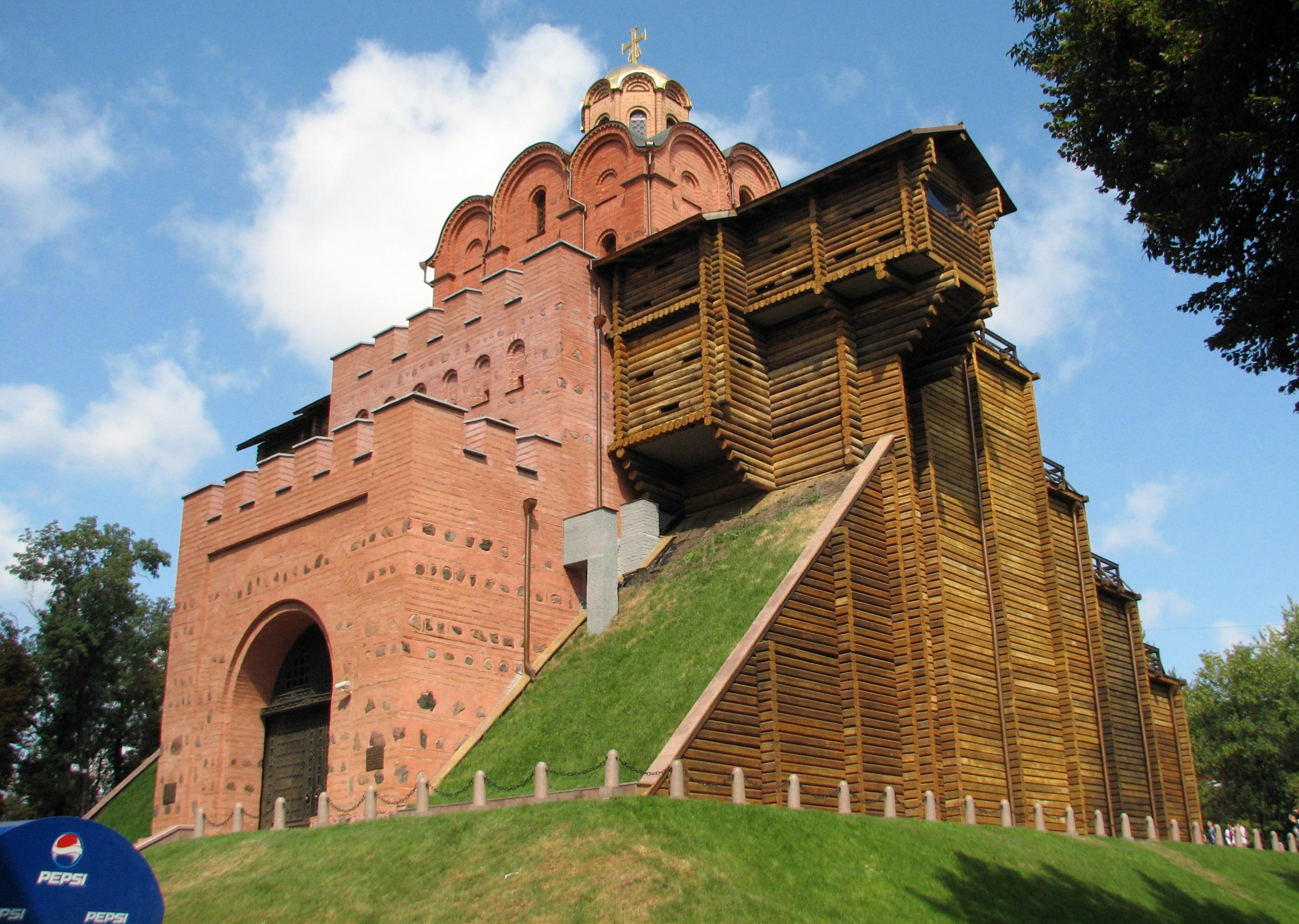
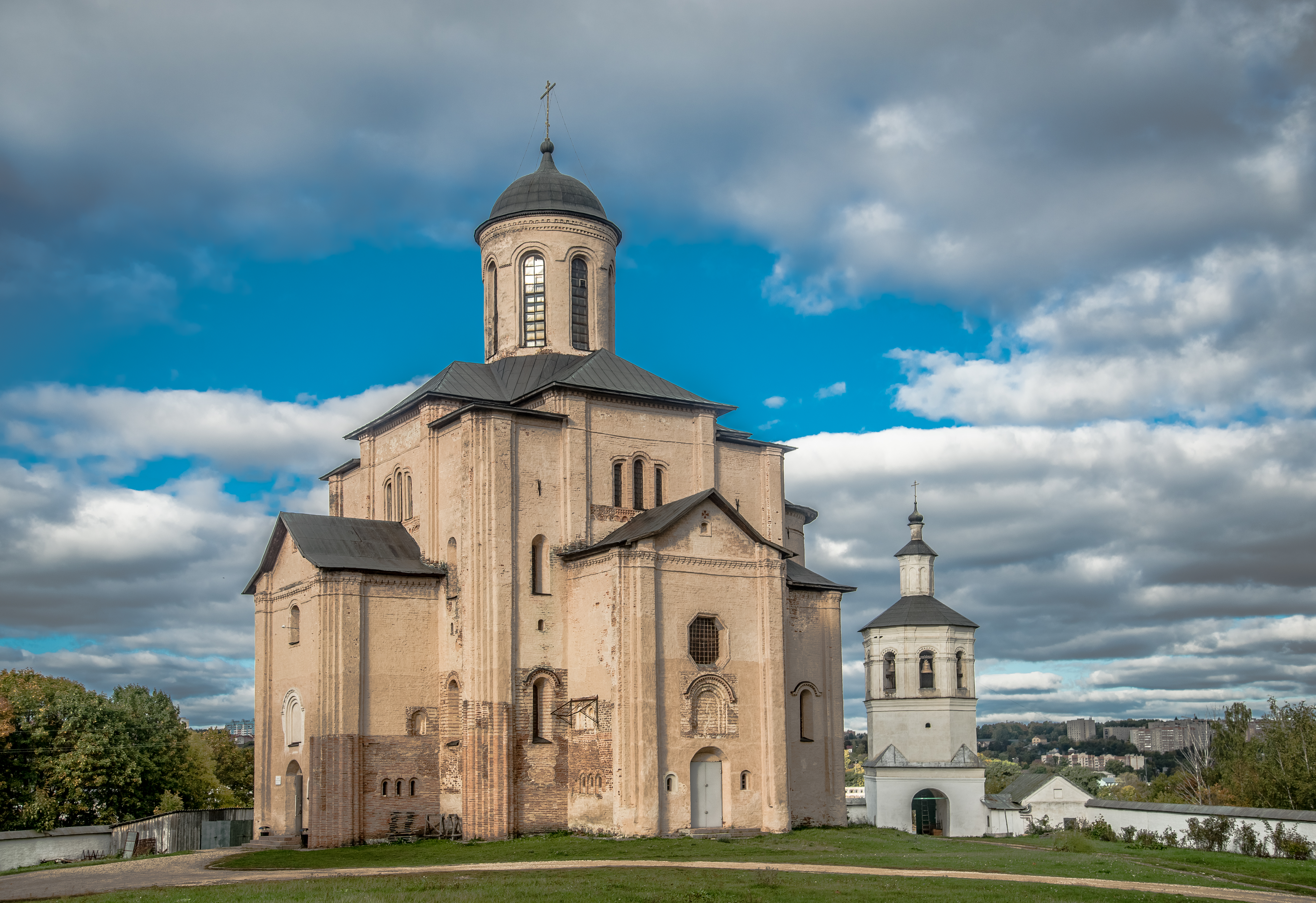
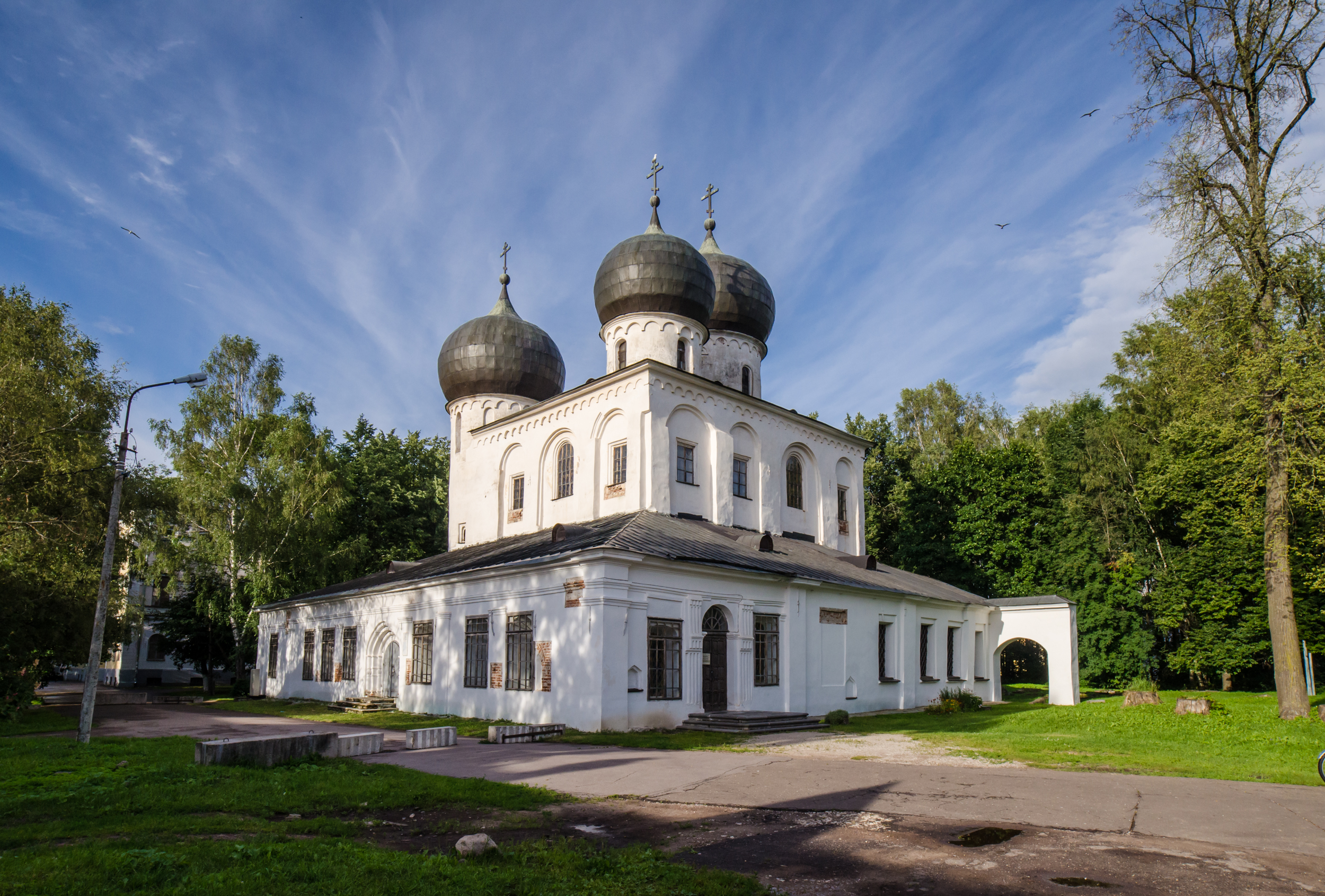
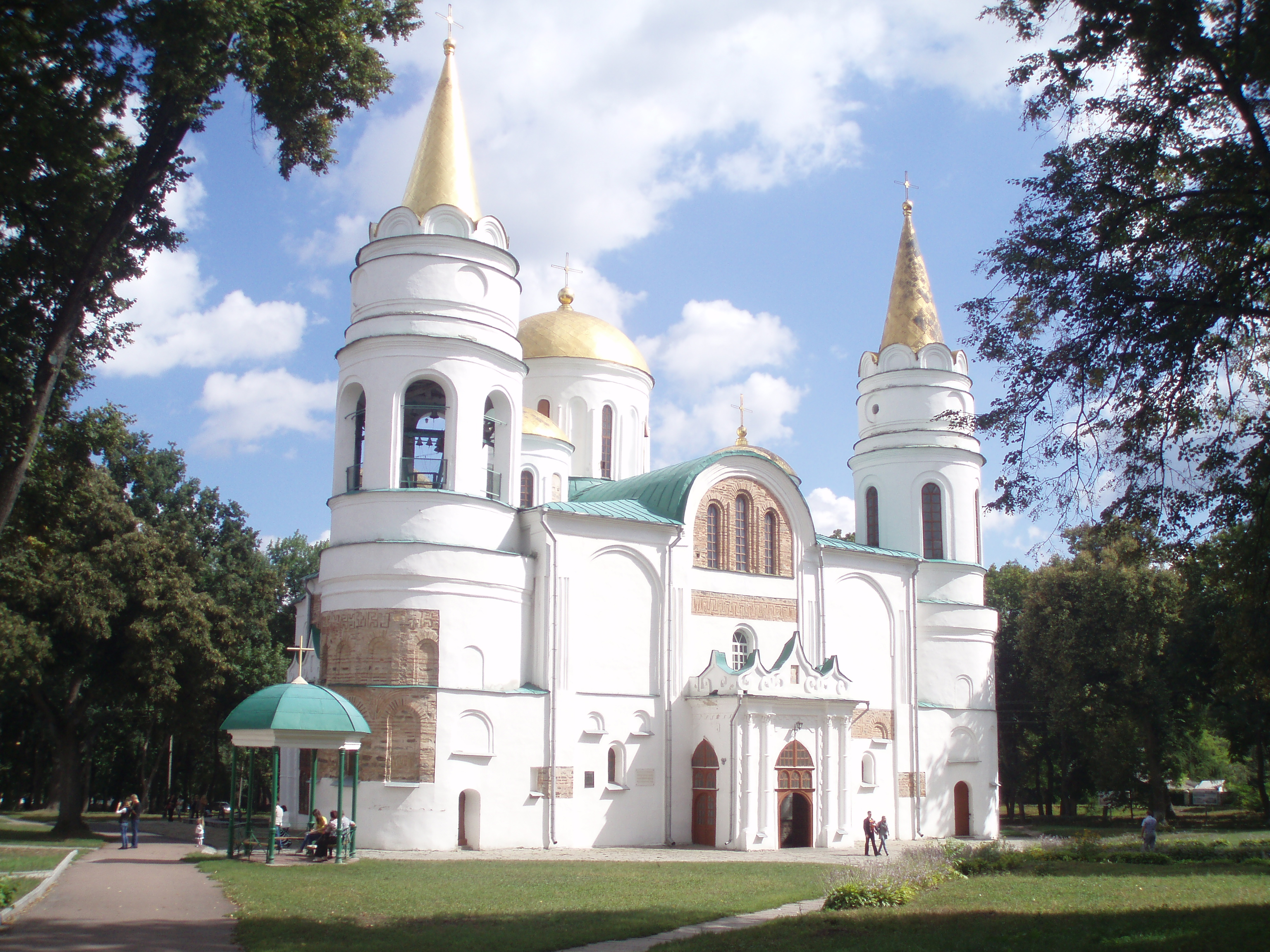
(top) Cathedral of St. Sophia, Novgorod (1045–1050), Cathedral of St. John the Baptist, Pskov, The Golden Gate, Kyiv (c. 1100, largely reconstructed)
(bottom) St. Michael the Archangel Church, Smolensk (1180–1197); Katholikon of the Antoniev Monastery, Novgorod (1122), Transfiguration Cathedral, Chernihiv (11th century)

Architecture in Kievan Rus' was centered on Kiev and Novgorod. The architecture of Kievan Rus' is the earliest period of both Russian and Ukrainian architecture, using the foundations of Byzantine culture but with use of innovations and architectural features. Most surviving architecture from this period consists of Russian Orthodox churches, or parts of the gates and fortifications of cities.

After the disintegration of Kievan Rus' and the Mongol invasion in the first half of the 13th century, the architectural tradition of Kievan Rus' architecture continued in the principalities of Novgorod, Vladimir-Suzdal, and Galicia-Volhynia. It had a direct influence on later Russian, Ukrainian, and Belarusian architecturural styles.

== Church architecture ==
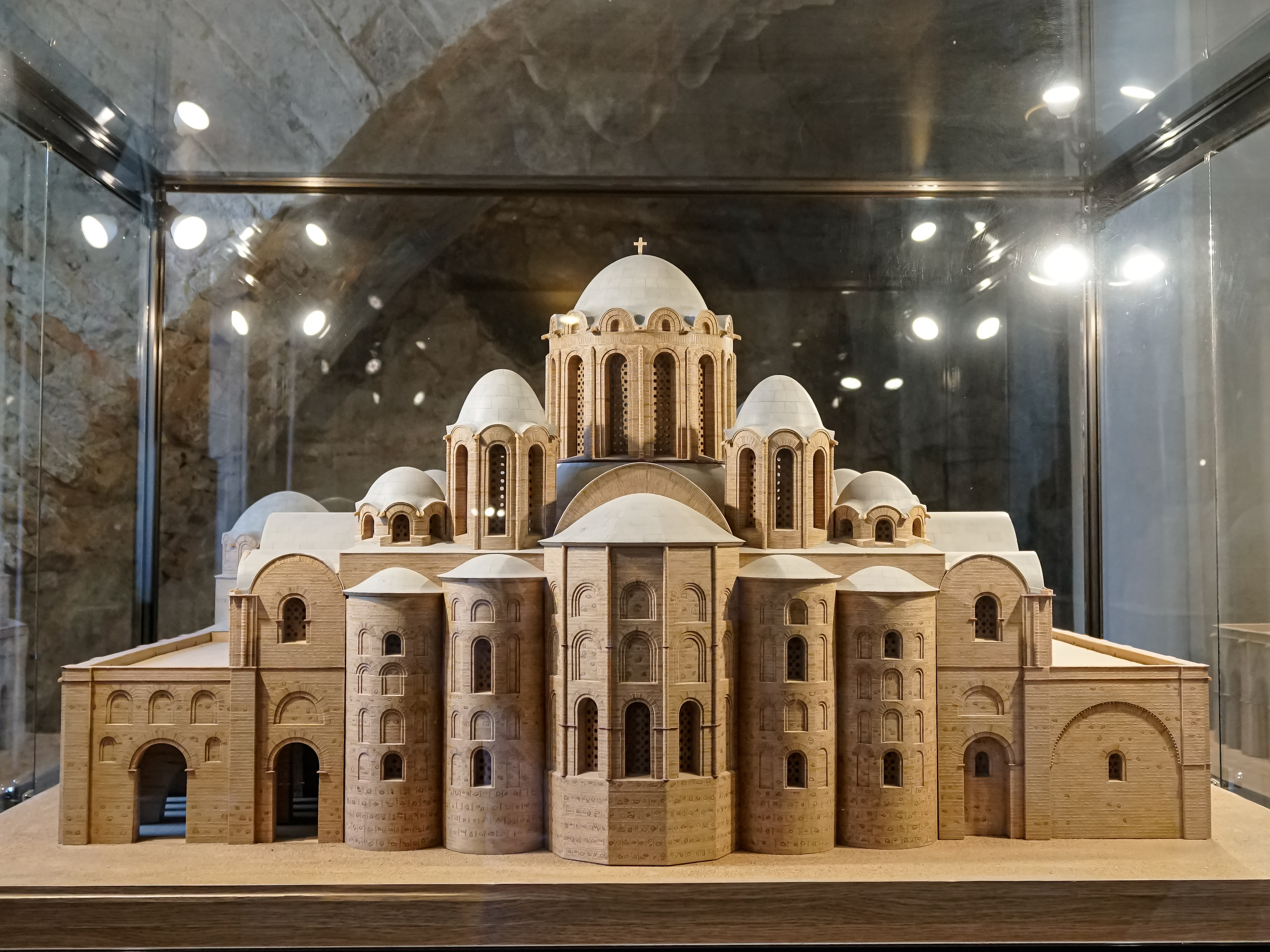
Before its reconstruction in the 18th century, St. Sophia in Kiev was a prime example and a model for all churches in Kievan Rus'

The great churches of Kievan Rus', built after the adoption of Christianity by the people of Rus' in 988, were the first examples of monumental architecture in the East Slavic lands. The architectural style of the Kievan state, which quickly established itself, was strongly influenced by Byzantine architecture. Early Eastern Orthodox churches were mainly made of wood, with the simplest form of church becoming known as a cell church. Major cathedrals often featured scores of small domes, which led some art historians to take this as an indication of what the pagan Slavic temples should have looked like. The 10th-century Church of the Tithes in Kiev was the first cult building to be made of stone. The earliest Kievan churches were built and decorated with frescoes and mosaics by Byzantine masters.

Another example of an early church of Kievan Rus' was the Saint Sophia Cathedral in Kiev (1037), built by Yaroslav the Wise. Much of its exterior has been altered with time, extending over the area and eventually acquiring 25 domes.

The Saint Sophia Cathedral in Novgorod (1045–1050), expressed a new style that exerted a strong influence on Russian church architecture. Its austere thick walls, small narrow windows, and helmeted cupolas have much in common with the Romanesque architecture of Western Europe.

Even further departure from Byzantine models is evident in succeeding cathedrals of Novgorod: St Nicholas's (1113), St Anthony's (1117–1119), and St George's (1119). Along with cathedrals, of note was the architecture of monasteries of these times. The 12th–13th centuries were the period of feudal of Kievan Rus' into princedoms which were in nearly permanent feud, with multiplication of cathedrals in emerging princedoms and courts of local princes (knyazes).

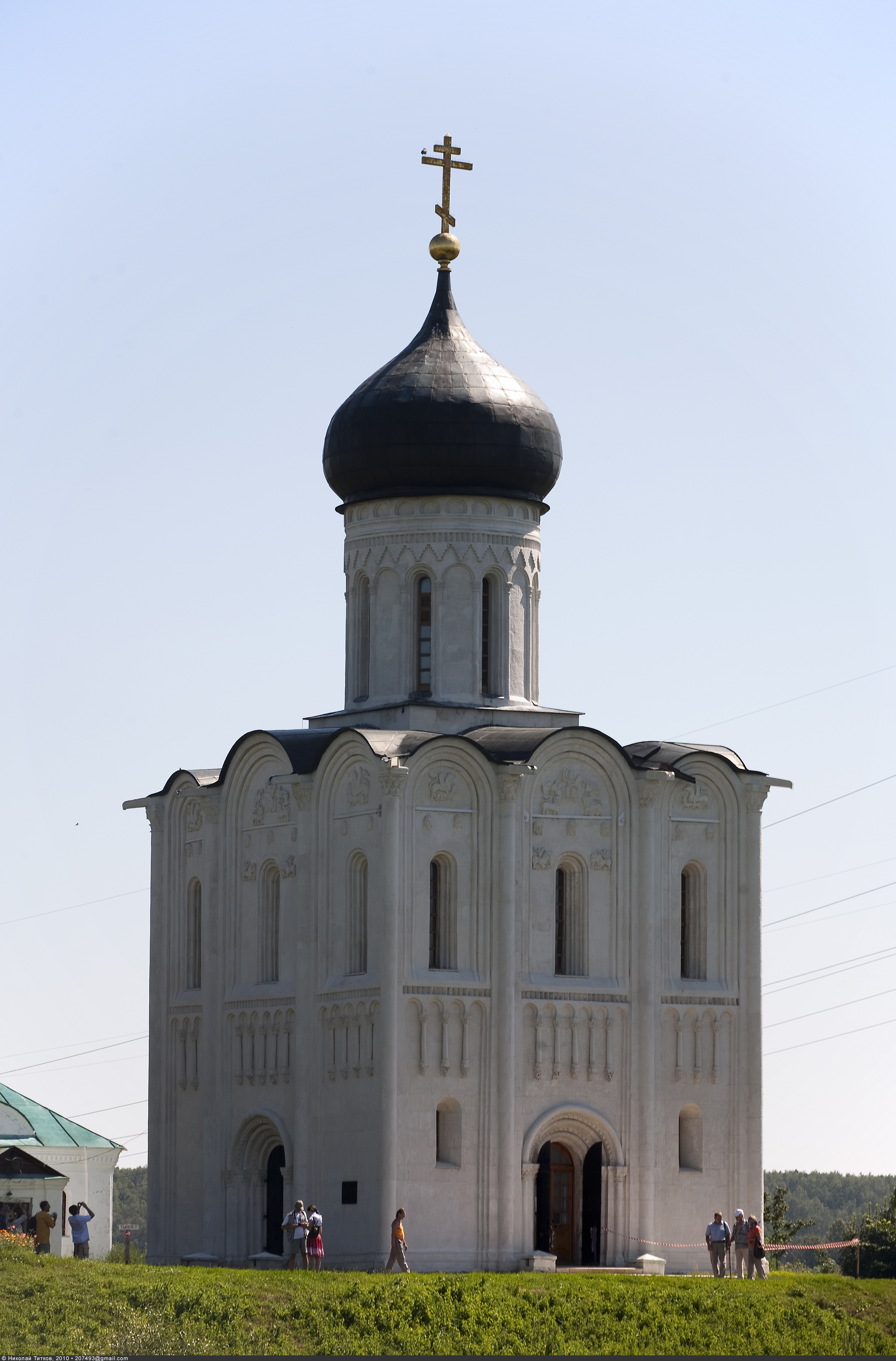
Church of the Intercession on the Nerl (1165), one of the most famous Russian medieval churches

By the end of the 12th century, the divide of the country was final and new centres of power took the Kievan style and adopted it to their traditions. In the northern principality of Vladimir-Suzdal the local churches were built of white stone. The Suzdal style is also known as white-stone architecture ("белокаменное зодчество"). The first white-stone church was the St. Boris and Gleb Church commissioned by Yuri Dolgoruky, a church-fortress in Kideksha near Suzdal, at the supposed place of the stay of knyazes Boris and Gleb on their pilgrimage to Kiev. The white-stone churches mark the highest point of pre-Mongolian Rus' architecture. The most important churches in Vladimir are the Dormition Cathedral (built 1158–1160, enlarged 1185–1198, frescoes completed in 1408) and Cathedral of Saint Demetrius (built 1194–1197).

In the western splinter of Kingdom of Galicia-Volhynia churches in a traditional Kievan style were built for some time, but eventually the style began to drift towards Central European Romanesque tradition. The white stone masonry of Galician school of architecture was likely the inspiration of the development of a similar style in Vladimir-Suzdal.

Celebrated as these structures are, the contemporaries were even more impressed by churches of Southern Rus', particularly the Svirskaya Church of Smolensk (1191–1194). As southern structures were either ruined or rebuilt, restoration of their original outlook has been a source of contention between art historians. The most memorable reconstruction is the Piatnytska Church (1196–1199) in Chernigov (modern Chernihiv, Ukraine), by Peter Baranovsky.

== Secular architecture ==
The Golden Gates of Vladimir, despite much 18th-century restoration, could be regarded as an authentic monument of the period.

In modern Kyiv, no secular monuments have survived apart from the remains of the city's walls and gates. The Golden Gates of Kyiv were destroyed over the years with only the ruins remaining. In the 20th century a museum was erected above the ruins. It is a close image of the gates of the Kievan Rus' period but is not a monument of the time.

Defensive works of architecture such as city walls and city gates were common in Kievan Rus'. However, due to the fact that they were primarily built from wood, they have not survived into the present day, and their design has had to be reconstructed from their below-ground remains. The wooden defensive walls of Kievan Rus' fortresses were erected on top of earthen ramparts, some of which were supported by wooden frameworks. The gates in these walls were usually built into gate towers.

One of the best examples, the fortress of Bilhorod Kyivskyi, is waiting archaeological excavation. In the 1940s, the archaeologist Nikolai Voronin discovered the well-preserved remains of Andrei Bogolyubsky's palace in Bogolyubovo, dating from 1158 to 1165.

== See also ==
- List of buildings of pre-Mongol Rus'
- Kievan Rus' ornament

== Sources ==
- Averintsev, Sergey (1992). "The Baptism of Rus' and the path of Russian culture". In Hamant, Yves (ed.). The Christianization of Ancient Russia, a Millennium: 988-1988. United Nations Educational Scientific and Cultural. ISBN 978-92-3-102642-3.
- Mohytych, Ivan (2000). Архітектура Галицької землі княжого періоду [The Architecture of Galicia during the Princely Period] (in Ukrainian). Vol. 2.
- Simmons, Sarah C. (2016). "Rus' Dynastic Ideology in the Frescoes of the South Chapels in St. Sophia, Kiev". In Matheou, Nicholas S.M.; Kampianaki, Theofili; Bondioli, Lorenzo M. (eds.). From Constantinople to the Frontier: The City and the Cities. Brill. ISBN 9789004307742.
- Rappoport, Pavel (30 December 1969). "Russian Medieval Military Architecture". Gladius. 8: 39–62. doi:10.3989/gladius.1969.175.
