= Kievan Rus' ornament =

Ornamental patterns characteristic of the culture of Kievan Rus'

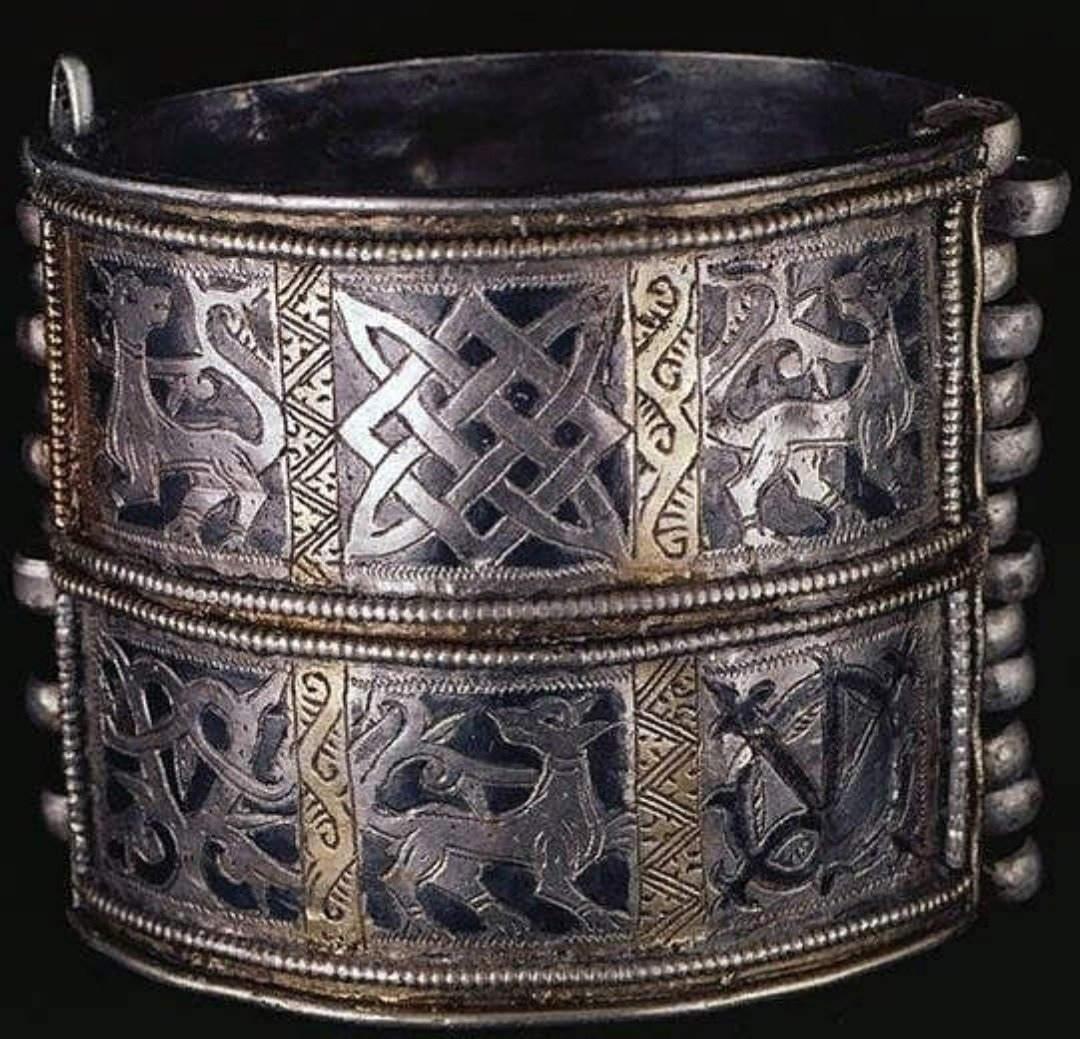
Silver bracelet with Kievan Rus' animal ornament from the treasure in Staraya Ryazan, second half of the 12th century

Kievan Rus' ornament is a general designation for ornamental patterns characteristic of the culture of Kievan Rus', and partially rooted in its pre-Christian period. There was also influence outside Kievan Rus', in particular in Poland, Moravia and Scandinavia (see “§ Outside Kievan Rus'”).

== Definition ==
Ornament in the works of Kievan Rus' art was rarely the subject of special study in the works of historians and culturologists. Interest in ornamental patterns and the peculiarities of their manifestation in Kievan Rus' culture appeared only towards the end of the 19th century. The paleographer Vyacheslav Shchepkin developed the methodological foundations for the study of Kievan Rus' ornament. He laid the foundations for the genetic analysis of the ornament, revealing its original element and the nature of its changes (doubling, dividing the ornamental pattern, etc.). Also, Schepkin formulated a mechanism for creating compositions from individual elements, in which the combination of motifs in the ornament occurs on the basis of the instincts of symmetry and rhythm. Finally, he gave a description of the ornament as a whole, determining that the ornaments differ from each other:

1. according to the content of their motives,
2. according to the way they are combined and
3. by the nature of its frame (meaning the edges of the ornamental pattern).

By species, one can clearly distinguish the distribution of animal and plant ornaments in Kievan Rus'; according to Shchepkin, the latter manifested itself primarily in the ornamentation of the oldest Kievan Rus' chronicle books, emphasizing that the floral ornament is based on only one simple motif - a branch.

== On metal ==
=== Melee weapons ===
Edged weapons in Kievan Rus' were not ornamented so often; Basically, the pattern was applied to captured weapons. The big exception is swords, the hilts of which were often inlaid. Among these swords, the following stand out:

1. a sword from Karabichev with a handle of the European-Rus' type and a Byzantine type ornament (1st half of the 11th century);
2. a sword from Foshchevata (forger Ludota) with a Kievan Rus' type hilt (10th century);
3. a sword from the burial of a combatant in Kiev (10th century);
4. sword of the Scandinavian (Viking) type from the Dnieper rapids (10th century);
5. a fragment of a nominal sword with the inscription "слав" (11th century).

Since the 12th century, sabers have become widespread, which were forged from carburized iron blanks, after which they were repeatedly hardened using a particularly complex technology, resulting in a product with the hardest blade. As with swords, the hilts of some sabers also show traces of silver inlay.

Of the ornamented axes, the so-called “Adrey Bogolyubsky's hatchet” attracts the most attention, which is, in fact, a chased hatchet (an ax with a hammer on a yard-long handle) inlaid close to the animal style. On the front side of the ax there is an image of a pierced snake in the form of the Cyrillic letter “a”, according to Kirpichnikov, corresponding to the content of Kievan Rus' bylines. On the reverse side is an image of two birds. The hatchet itself dates from the period of the 11th-13th centuries.

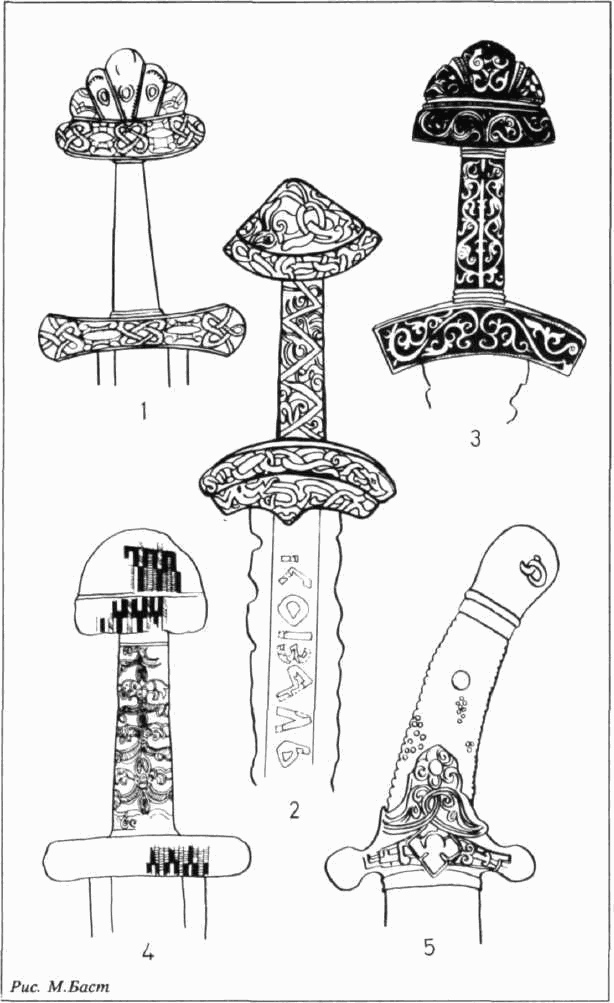
1. Sword from Karabichev. 2. Sword of blacksmith Ludota. 3. Sword from the burial of a combatant in Kiev. 4. Sword of the Scandinavian type from the Dnieper rapids. 5. Saber of the Magyar type. Gochevo. 10th century

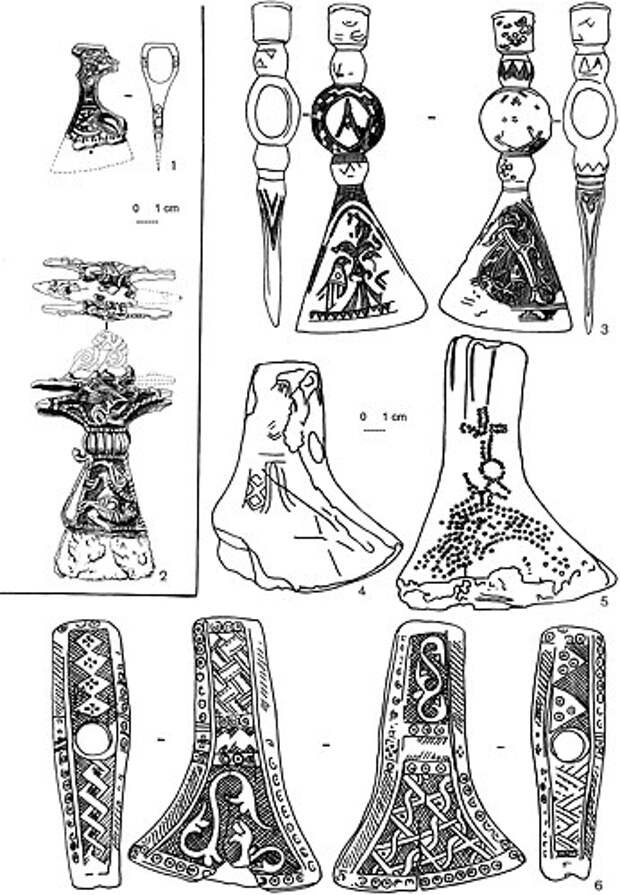
Above - "Axe of Andrei Bogolyubsky", below - the upper part of the ax from Novgorod. 11th-13th centuries

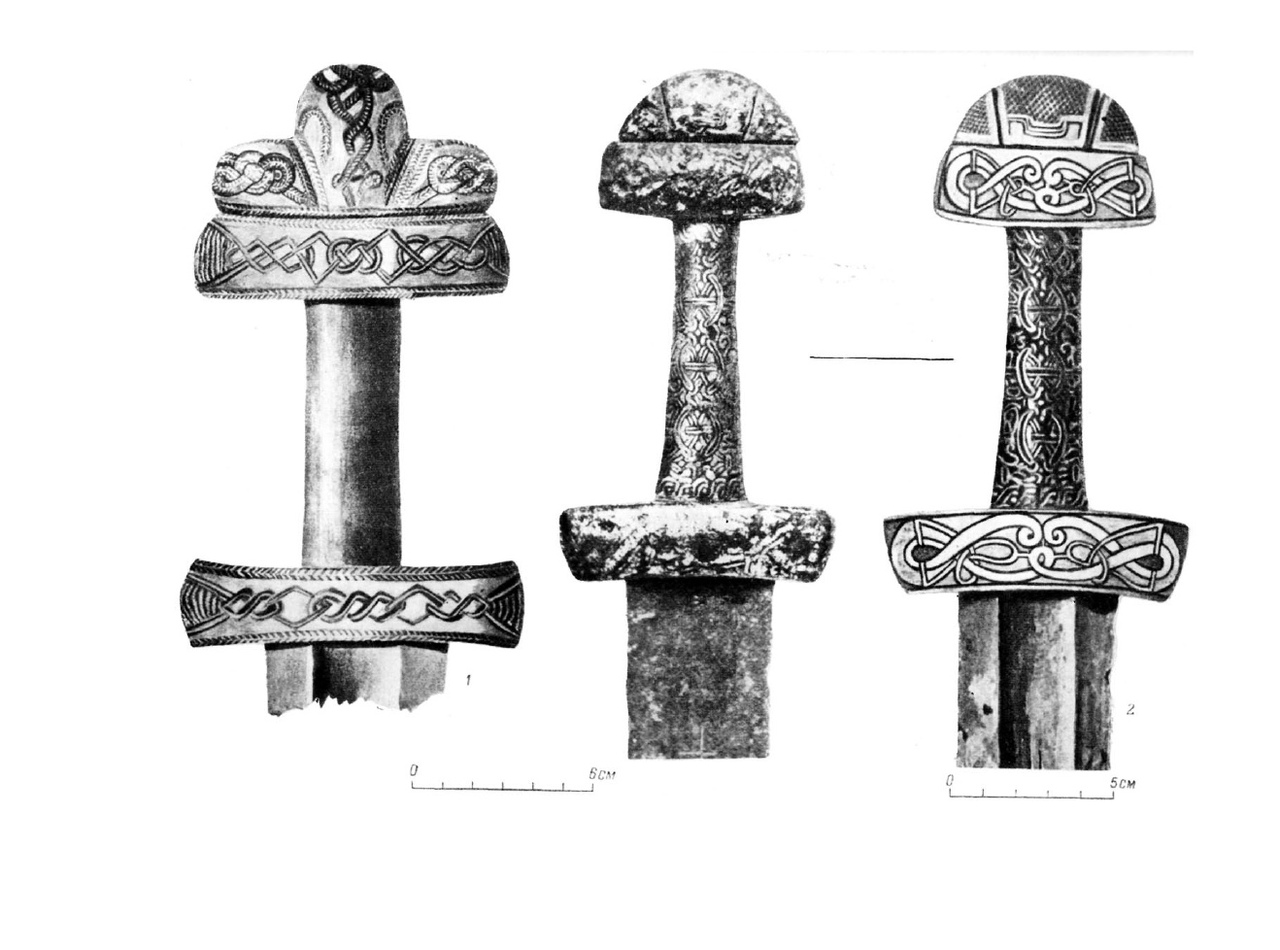
Reconstruction of sword hilts. 9th-10th centuries

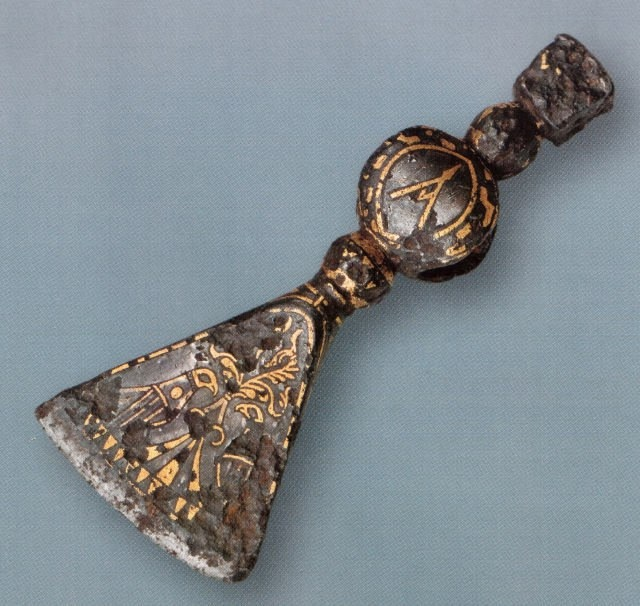
Hatchet (axe) of Andrei Bogolyubsky, reverse side

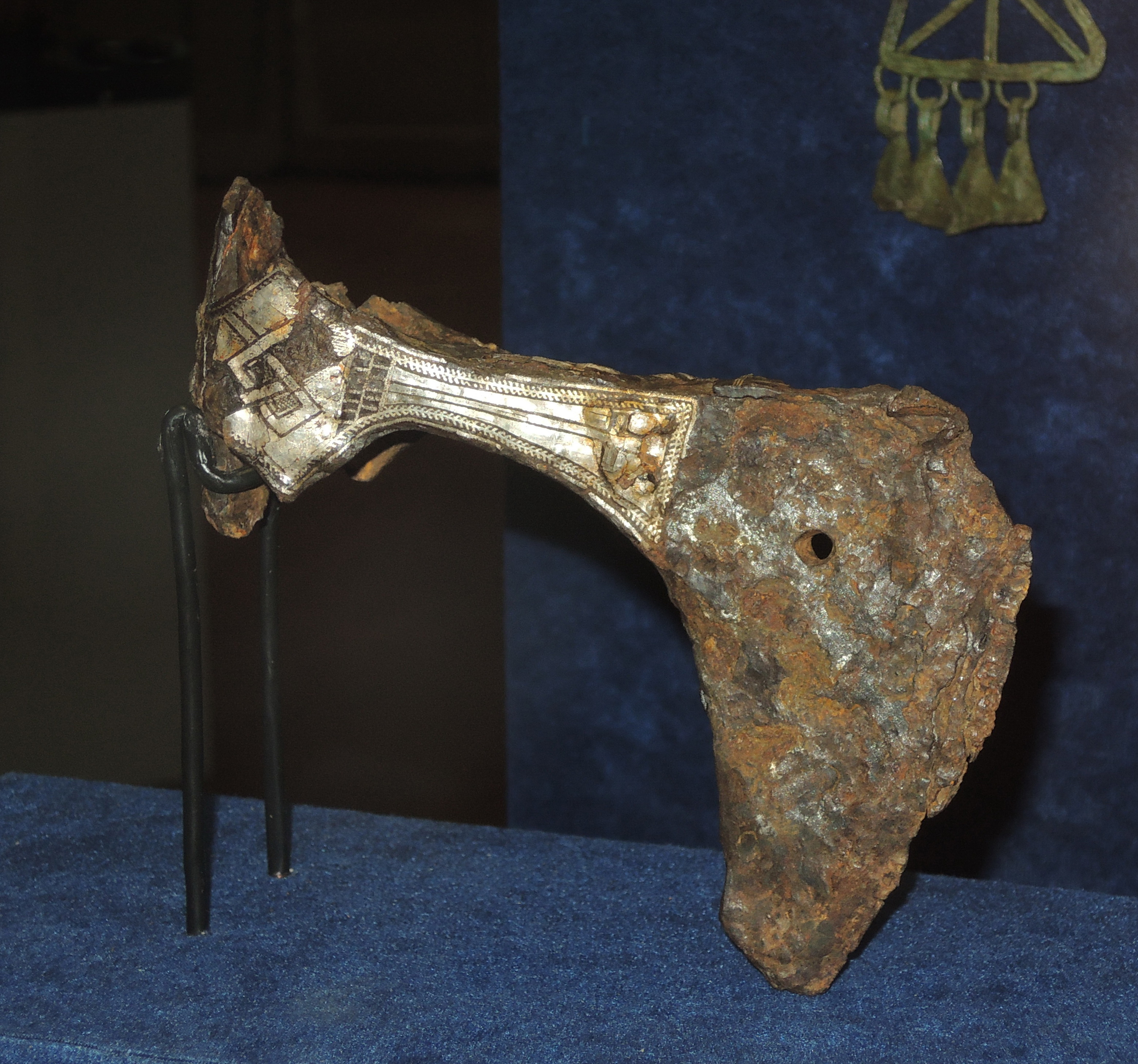
Ax from the village of Sheshkovo (Ivanovo region) with signs of Rurikovich

=== Decoration arts ===
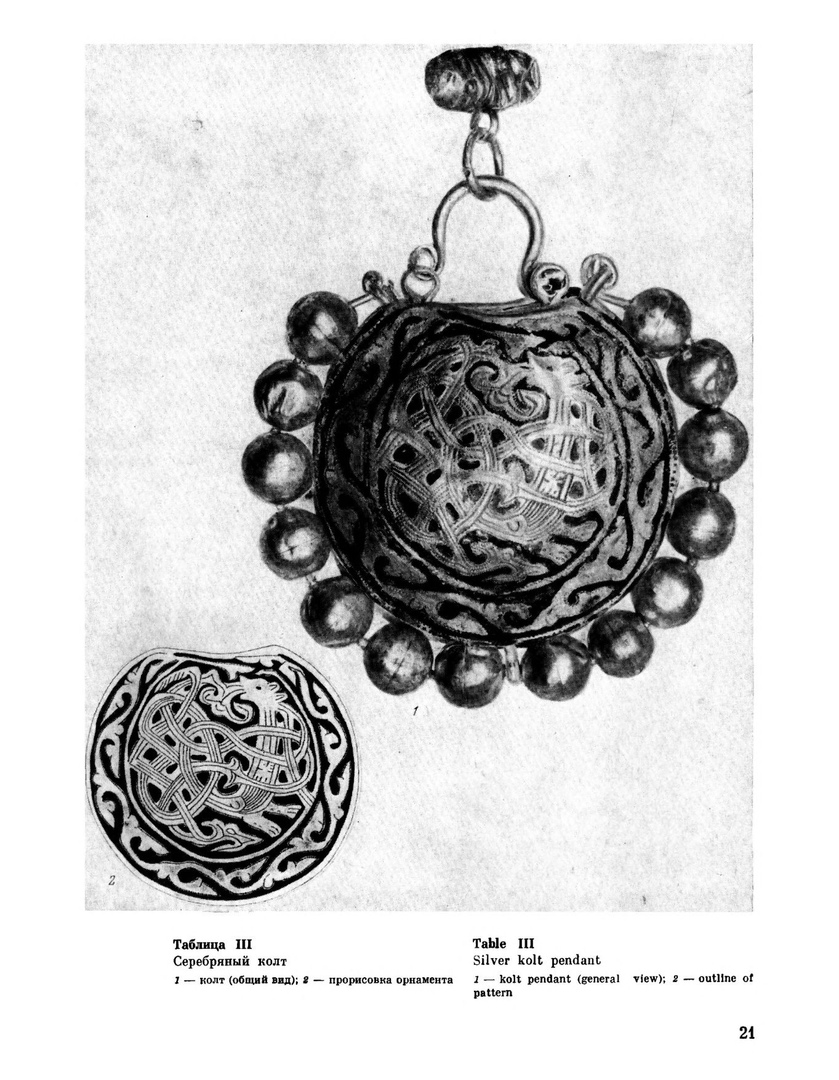
Silver colt and drawing of a Kievan Rus' ornament (left) from a treasure in Staraya Ryazan, second half of the 12th century

Among the decorations of the personal attire of the Kievan Rus' population, the ornamental pattern was present more often than on weapons, eventually evolving into the so-called animal style. Some decorated household items could be distributed both among the nobility and among ordinary citizens.

Kievan Rus' bronze thick-plastic rings are also distinguished from personal attire, differing from simple rings in a cast ornament of three to five hallmarks, each of which contains an element of a complex ornamental pattern. This type of rings was first singled out in 1959 by Mikhail Zhitomirskaya and named cellular in his thesis “Ornamented rings and bracelets of the Vyatichi”. The greatest width of the ring is 9 mm, the length in the pattern is 60–65 mm. The relation of the rings to the culture of the Vyatichi is not in doubt among archaeologists. Most of the rings were found only in burials, however, analogues of some types are also found in the cultural strata of the population. Casting molds for making this type of rings have not been found. Most of the rings date back to the 11th century, only a few belong to an earlier period.

On 14 copies of the rings, the remains of enamel were seen: red (8 copies), green (2 copies) and lost color (4 copies). In addition to them, the so-called "knyazely" rings with shields and seals are known, but they are not ornamented in such detail.

Especially valuable are the finds from the hoard found in Staraya Ryazan in 1970, among which a silver colt and a silver bracelet with a distinct ornament in the animal style stand out. A fantastic beast is depicted on a silver colt in the twists of a ribbon braid with vegetable curls. Similar monsters, characteristic of the animal style of the 12th-13th centuries, can be found on Chernihiv kolts. On a wide bracelet, animal-like creatures are also depicted next to the ornament; it is possible that during its manufacture there was an influence of Slavic mythology. The stylistic similarity with the bracelet of the Staraya Ryazan treasure of 1966 indicates that they were made in the same workshop. The relation of this bracelet to women's attire is indisputable. The matte black background sets off with the brilliance of the figures left in silver and the soft gilding of the borders. Apparently, when applying when drawing drawings, sets of openwork metal stencils were used, which made it possible to repeat images and give them a mirror image. Thanks to hand engraving, identical patterns vary in detail.

In addition to these two specimens, ornamental elements also appear on other finds, including kolts, pendants, and necklaces. In total, there are more than 40 artifacts in the Staraya Ryazan treasure.

== In manuscripts ==
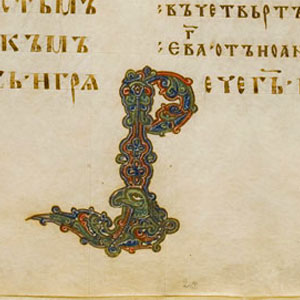
A letter in the form of a floral ornament, Ostromir Gospel, 1056-1057

The Russian paleographer Vyacheslav Shchepkin was the first to combine the ornamentation of Old East Slavic handwritten collections (marginal and capital decorations, capital letters of the first page of the “letter cap”) with the term floral ornament, the main element of which is a branch. Later it was believed that this element underlies the floral ornament of the oldest Old East Slavic books: Ostromir Gospels (1056-1057), Svyatoslav's Izbornik (1073), the Mstislav Gospel (until 1117), the Missal of Varlaam Khutynsky (12th century), the Yuryevsky Gospel (1119-1128).

Even at the beginning of the 20th century, Nikodim Kondakov noted the similarity of the ornamentation of the oldest Kievan Rus' miniatures with cloisonné enamel. The same circumstance prompted Boris Rybakov to attribute manuscripts with floral ornaments to a separate category of ornamental art. Both in miniatures and on cloisonne enamel, the pattern of the drawing is the same: in the simplest version, it is a three-petal flower.

== Outside Kievan Rus' ==
Some elements of Kievan Rus' culture were found in the Polish burial grounds in Lutomiersk, many of which have analogues in late Varangian-Kievan Rus' burials. All objects, both from the field of ritual customs and material culture, are associated mainly with Kievan Rus, and through it with the culture of the peoples living in the Black Sea and Ural steppes, as well as with the Scandinavian and Baltic cultures. Scientists conduct several more remote anologies to the antiquities of Lutomersk with Kievan Rus' burials: distributors for belts with an ornament of bear heads, similar to those found in the village of Spasskoye, Kaminsky province, over the Omiya River (between the upper reaches of the Ob and Irtysh), as well as in the village of Kynovska and in the Perm region above the upper Kama.

The complex of features that distinguish these foreign, non-Polish burials is directly related to Kievan Rus', namely, to the burials and the cremation ritual characteristic of the Varangian-Kievan Rus' burial grounds (extensive burial pits and stone lining, in many cases the presence of a horse team). According to the assumption of Konrad Yazhzhevsky, which arose in the North Slavic environment and later spread among the Varangians-Rus, this burial rite came to Poland during the time of Boleslav the Brave, during the years of military clashes (1013, 1018 or 1019), when a small group of influential political emigrants (outcasts) from Kievan Rus, together with a group of warriors, among whom were the Slavized Varangians, found refuge here, and was planted "for fodder" away from the borders of the state. Partially Christianized, they left traces of their own culture in the local environment, but disappeared among the local population.

In the Baltic, many material and artistic values coming from Kievan Rus' were not only involved in the exchange between the inhabitants of the Baltic coasts and Scandinavia, but were also reproduced in local workshops. Numerous things fall into this category, such as carved bone ornamented combs, specific ceramics (perhaps even the production of pottery forms of Slavic origin in Sweden); certain types of weapons are made.

Particularly indicative is the distribution of richly decorated swords in the Baltic, later called swords of the Baltic-Scandinavian and Baltic-Slavic types; moreover, only the painted handle is original for most swords - the blades themselves are clearly of Roman production and date back to the period of the 4th-5th centuries. Presumably, some specimens of swords came to the Baltic lands in the 5th - first half of the 6th century from the former provinces of the Roman Empire after its fall. Such swords became more widespread in Scandinavia and Kievan Rus, where, presumably, they were produced. No local (Scandinavian) centers of production are known. But such production is definitely established in some other areas, on the roads and in the shopping centers of Great Moravia and Kievan Rus. In Kievan Rus', the production of hatchets (with a hammer on a yard-long handle) with a distinctive large blade was also established, from where they already got to Northern and Eastern Europe.

== Gallery ==
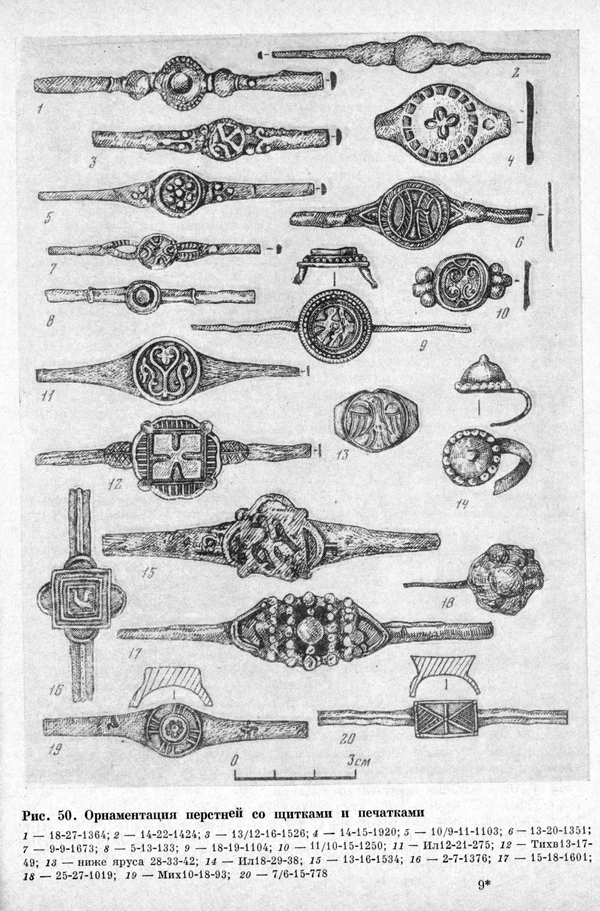
Ornamentation of rings with shields and seals, late 13th century

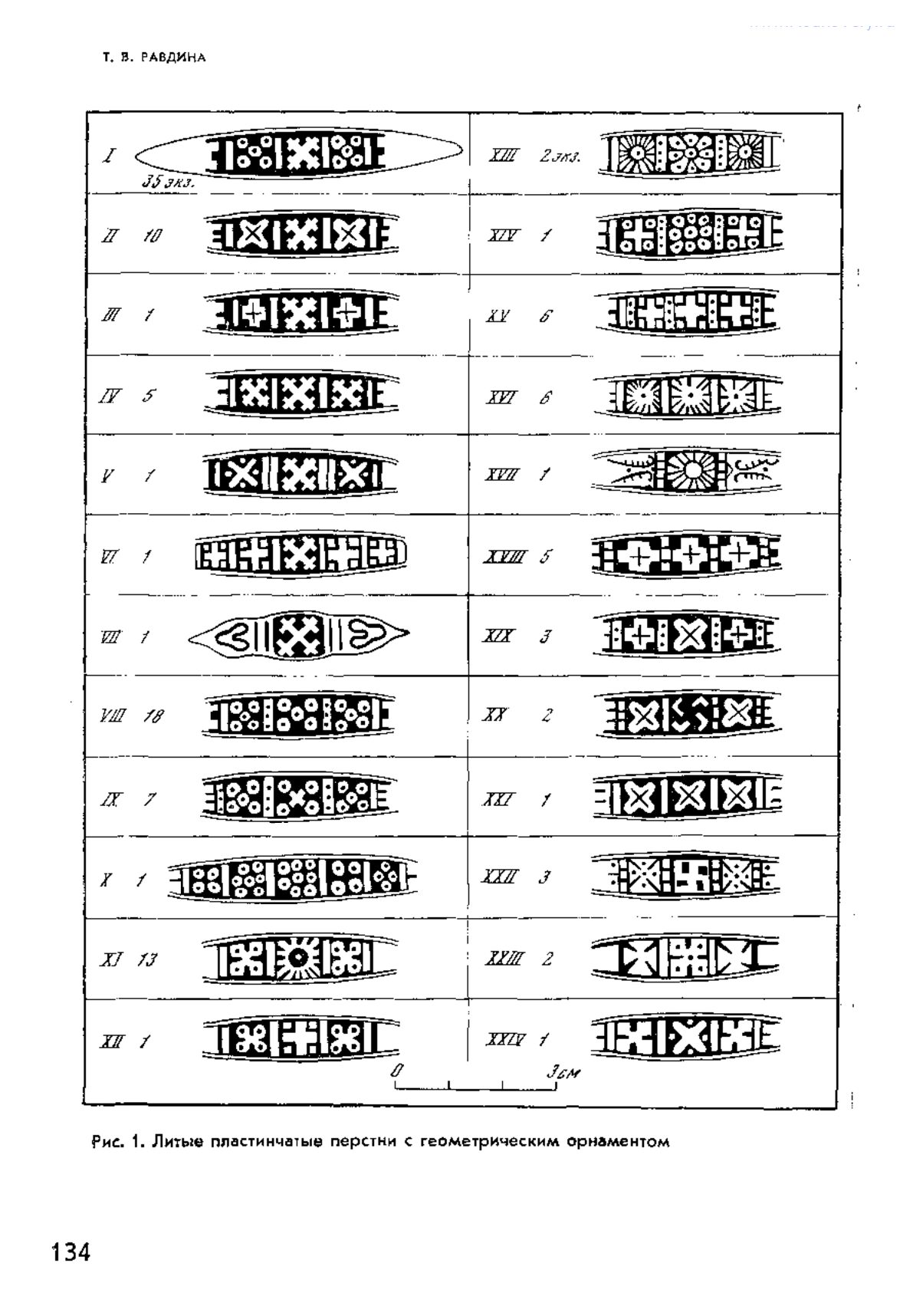
Kievan Rus' cast rings with a geometric (convex) ornament

== See also ==
- Culture of Kievan Rus'
