= Annavaram (disambiguation) =

Annavaram is a temple town home to Satyanarayana temple in Kakinada district of Andhra Pradesh, India.

Annavaram may also refer to:

- Annavaram, Guntur district, a village in Guntur district, Andhra Pradesh
- Annavaram, West Godavari, a village in West Godavari, Andhra Pradesh
- Chitti Annavaram, a temple in Madanapalle
- Annavaram (film), a 2006 Indian Telugu-language film

== See also ==
- Annavarapu Rama Swamy, Indian violinist
