= Annavaram bus station =

Indian bus station

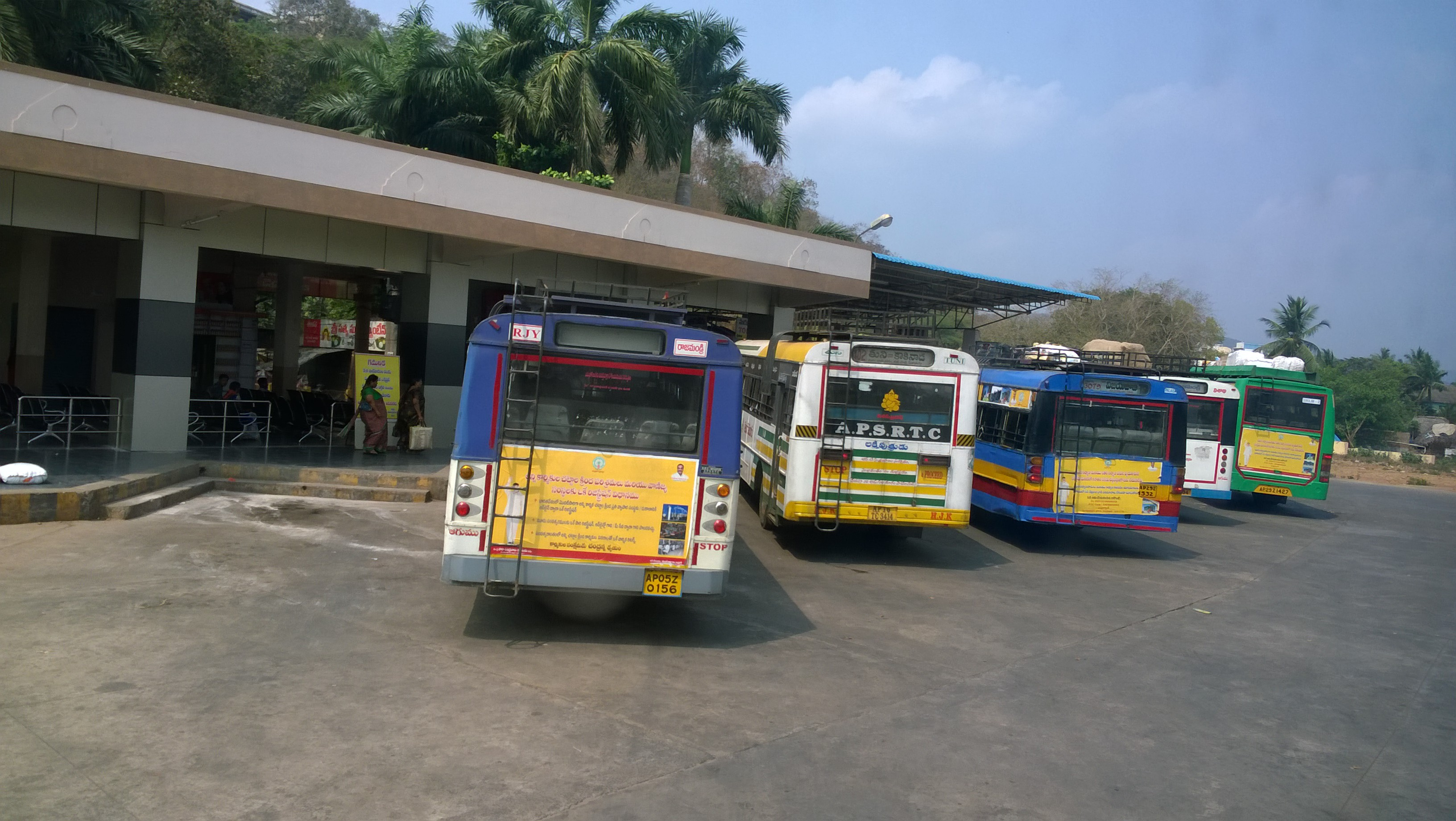
- Annavaram bus station

General information
- Location: Annavaram, Kakinada district, Andhra Pradesh; India
- Owner: APSRTC
- Platforms: 07

Construction
- Parking: Yes

Annavaram bus station is a bus station located in temple town Annavaram of the Indian state of Andhra Pradesh. It is owned by Andhra Pradesh State Road Transport Corporation. This is one of the major bus stations in the district, with services to all towns and villages in the district and also to nearby cities in the state.
