= Satyanarayana Temple, Annavaram =

Hindu temple in India

Veera Venkata Satyanarayana Swamy Temple, Annavaram
- శ్రీ వీర వెంకట సత్యనారాయణ స్వామి దేవాలయం, అన్నవరం
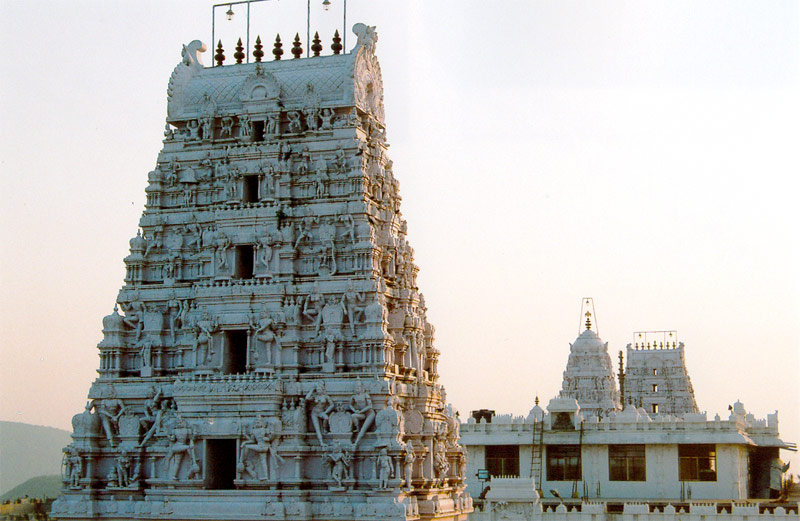
- Gopuram of Satynarayana Temple, Annavaram

- Location in Andhra Pradesh

Religion
- Affiliation: Hinduism
- District: Kakinada
- Deity: Veera Venkata Satyanarayana,
- Governing body: Veera Venkata Sathyanarayana Swamy Vari Devasthanam

Location
- Location: Annavaram
- State: Andhra Pradesh
- Country: India
- Coordinates: 17°17′59.9″N 82°24′8.6″E

Architecture
- Established: 1891
- Completed: 1933–34

Veera Venkata Satyanarayana Swamy Temple Hindu Vaishnavite temple in Annavaram in Kakinada district of Andhra Pradesh, India. Dedicated to Satyanarayana Swamy, an incarnation of Vishnu, the temple is situated on Ratnagiri Hill. It is one of the most visited religious sites in Andhra Pradesh and is recognized as one of the state's wealthiest temples. The temple holds significant importance as a major pilgrimage centre and is regarded by many as the second most prominent in the state after the Tirumala Venkateswara Temple.

== Architecture ==
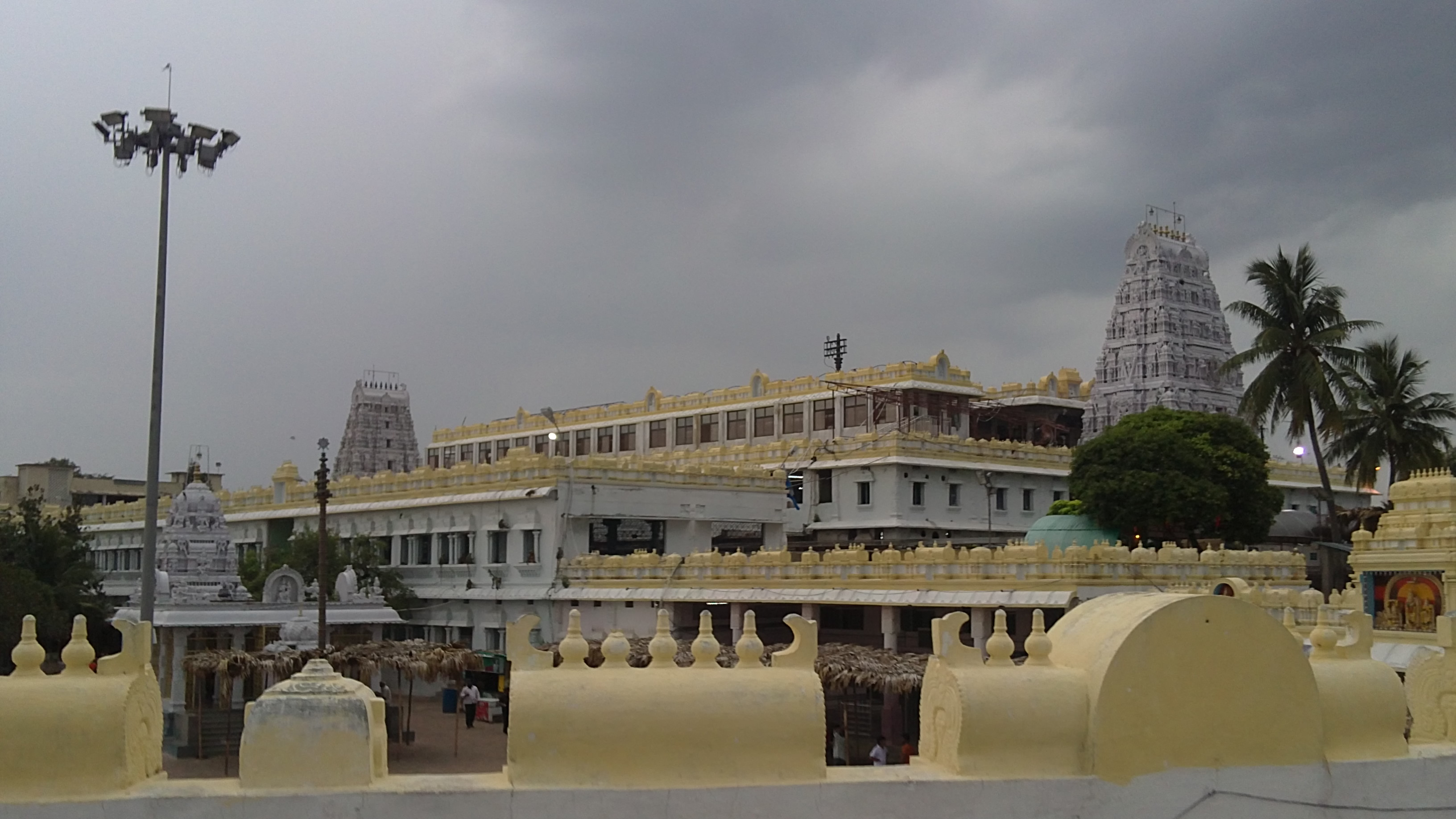
View of the entire temple

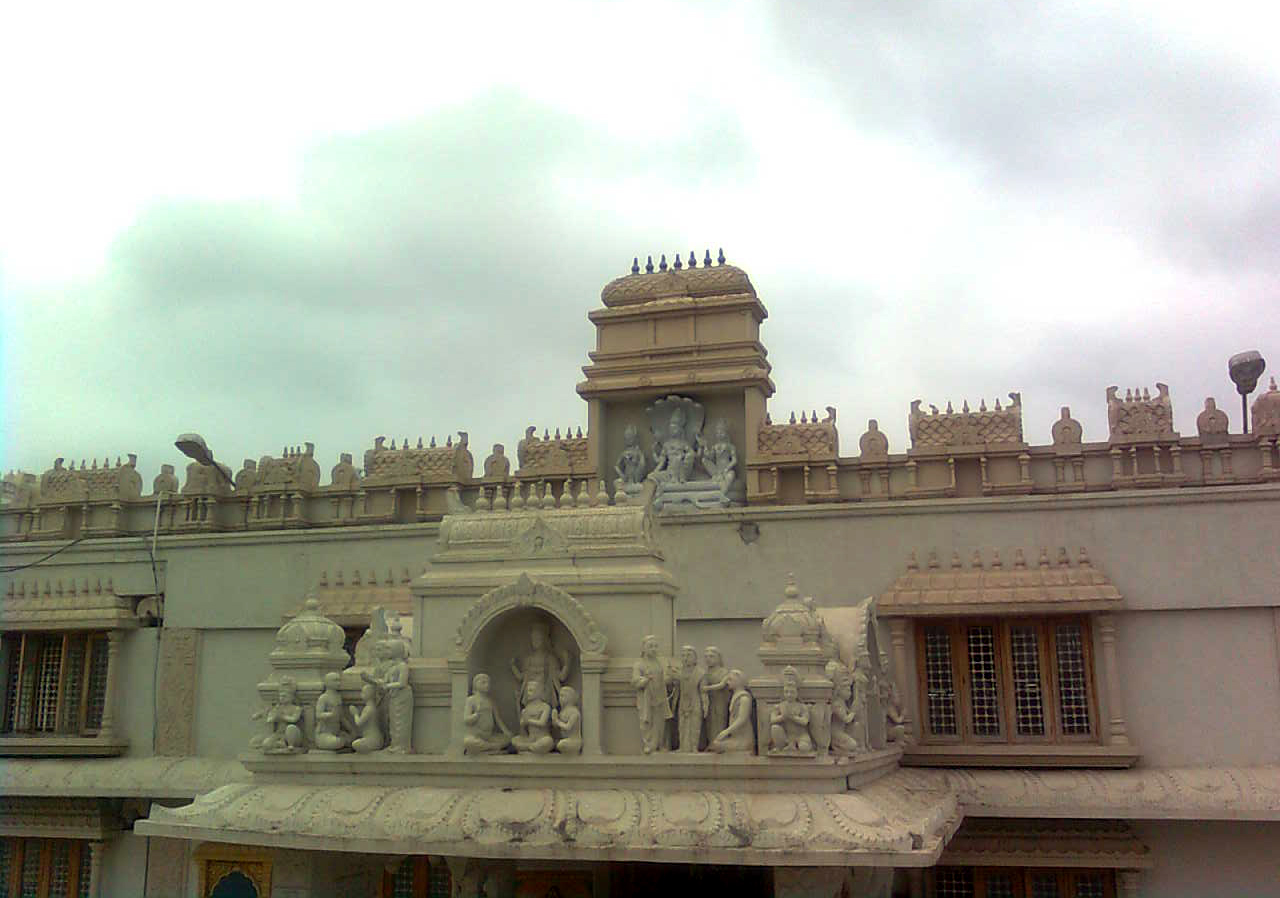
Temple complex

. Architecturally, the temple is designed to resemble a chariot, complete with four wheels at each corner, symbolizing the Jagannath concept of eternal movement through time. The four wheels are meant to represent the Sun and the Moon. The main entrance of the temple has been adorned with gold plating.

== Administration ==
The temple is being administered under Endowments department of Andhra Pradesh by a Trust board of 13 members.

The shrine earned ₹26 crore revenue in 2007.

== In popular culture ==
The temple has been depicted in various Telugu films over the years. Notable films featuring the temple include Sankarabharanam (1980), Nuvve Nuvve (2002), Mr. & Mrs. Sailaja Krishnamurthy (2004), and Geetha Govindam (2018).

== Gallery ==
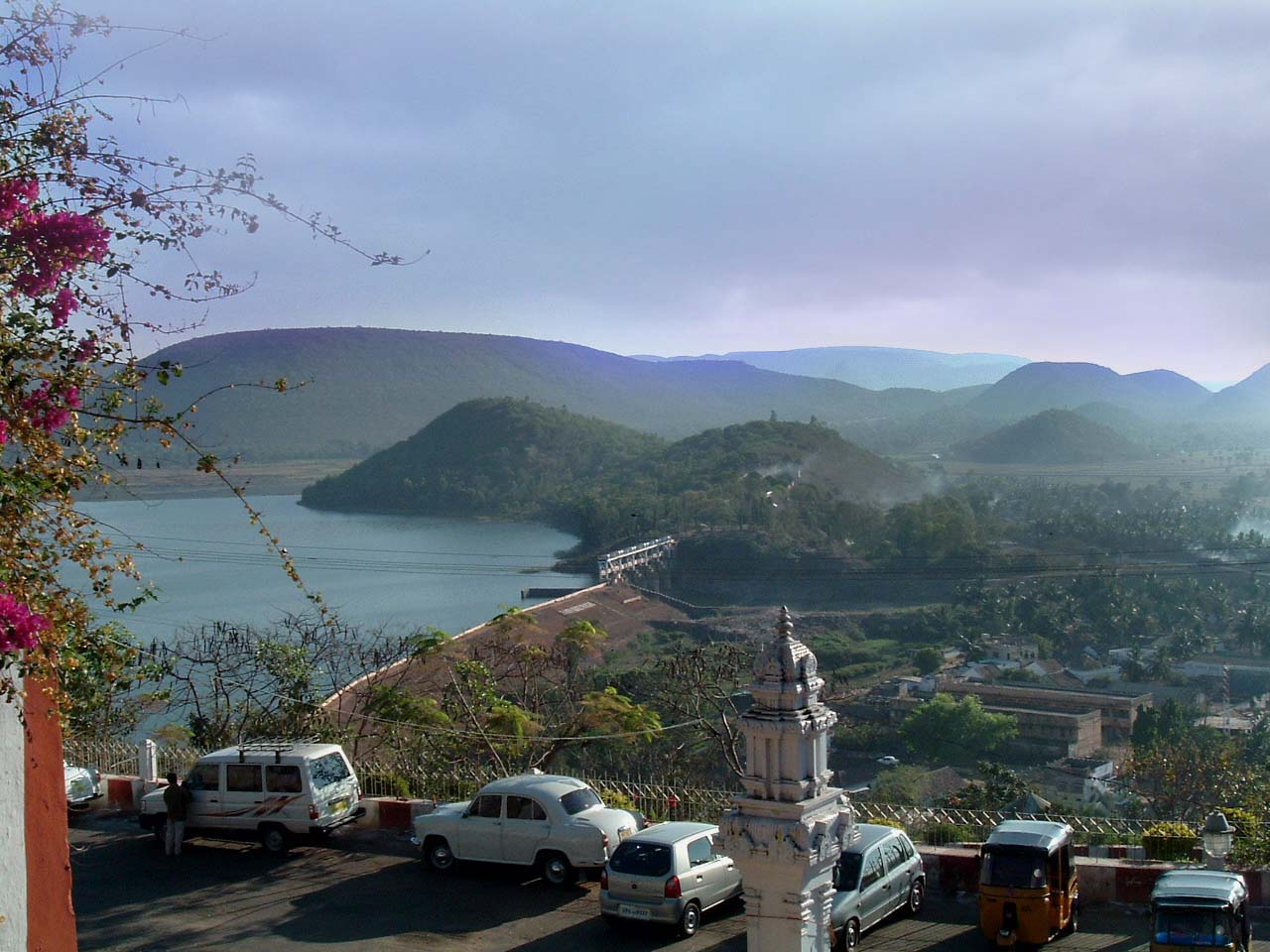
Ratnagiri mountain range

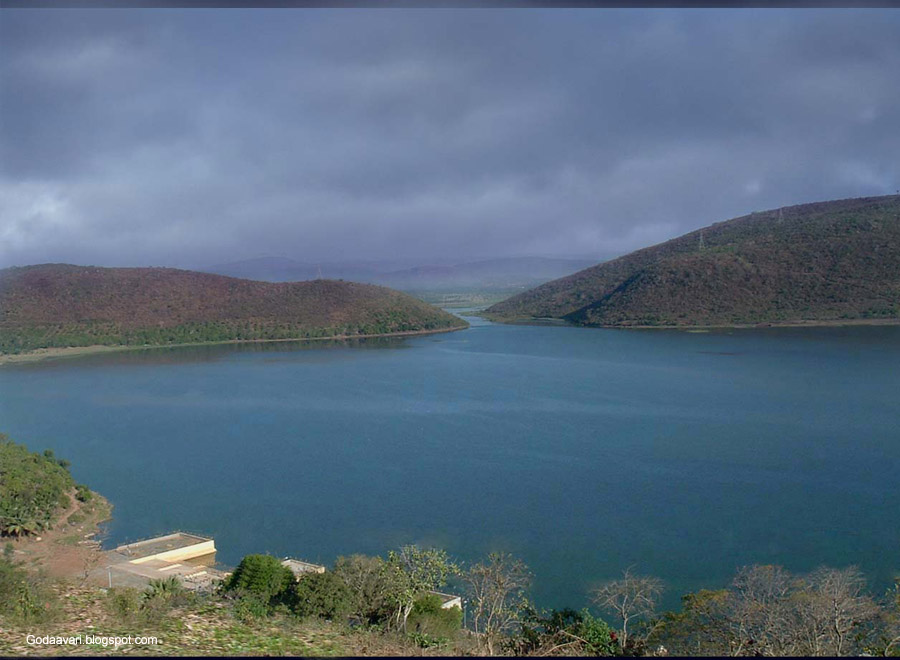
Pushkarini at the temple

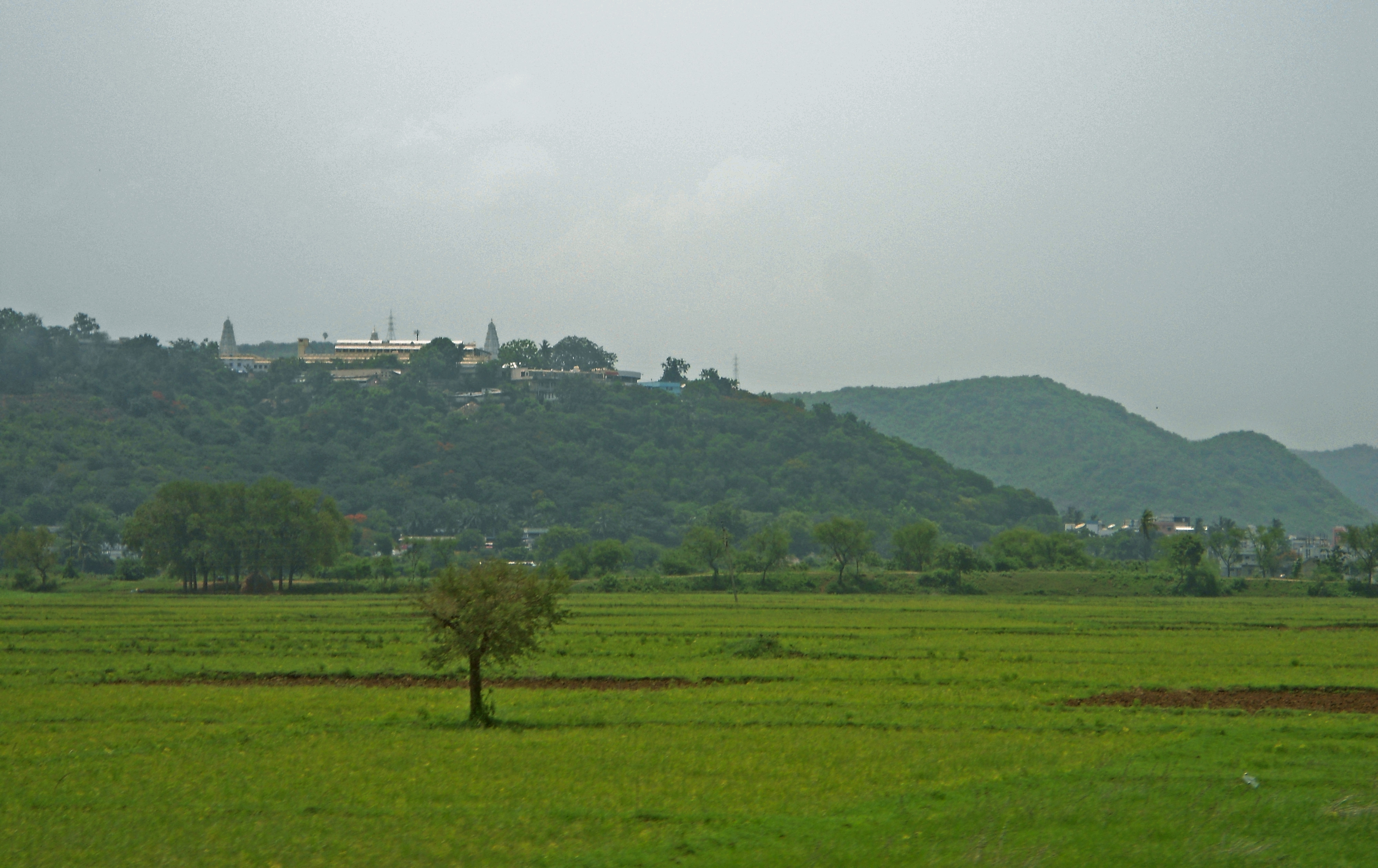
Annavaram hill view

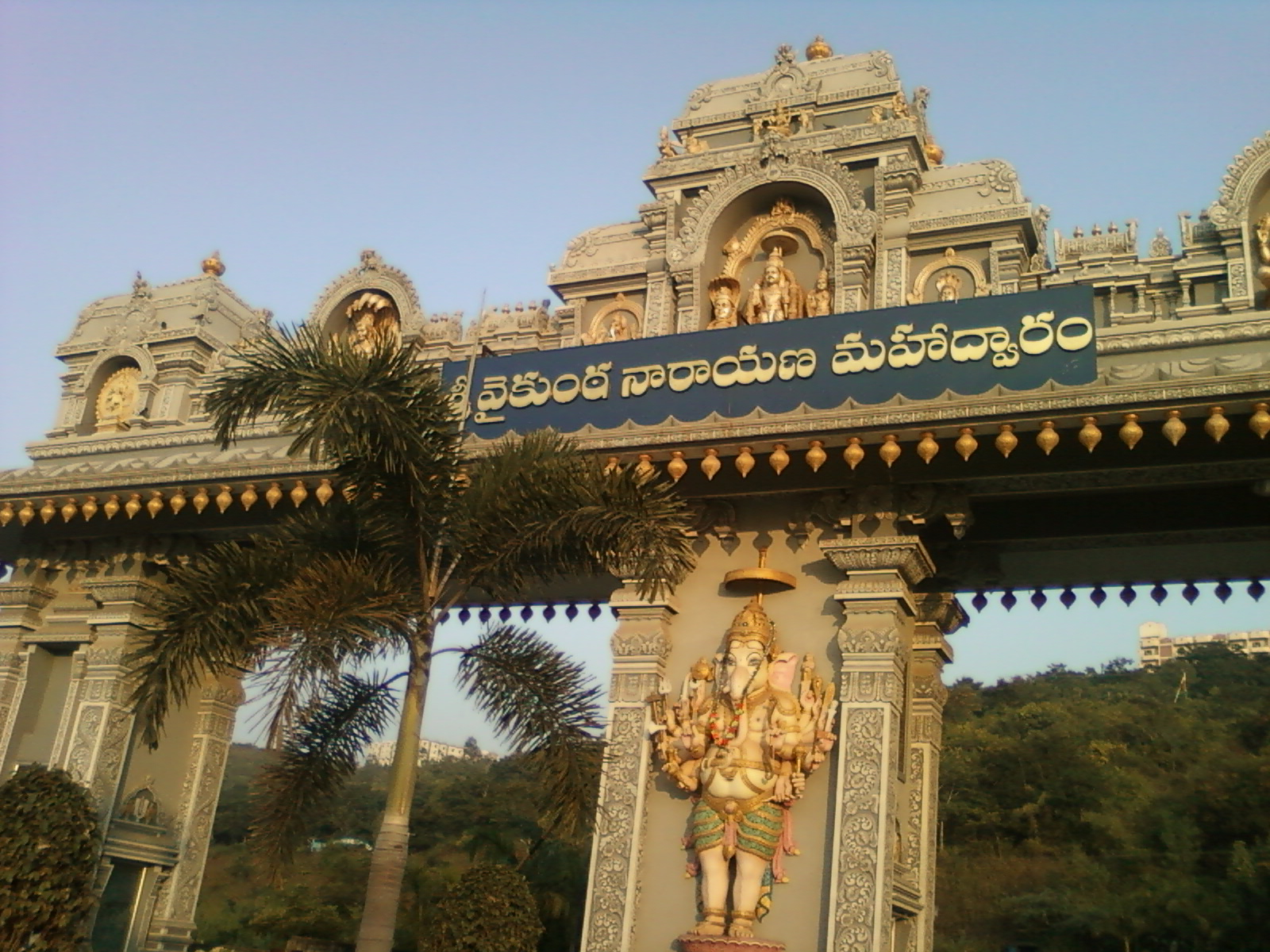
Entrance arch on new Ghat road

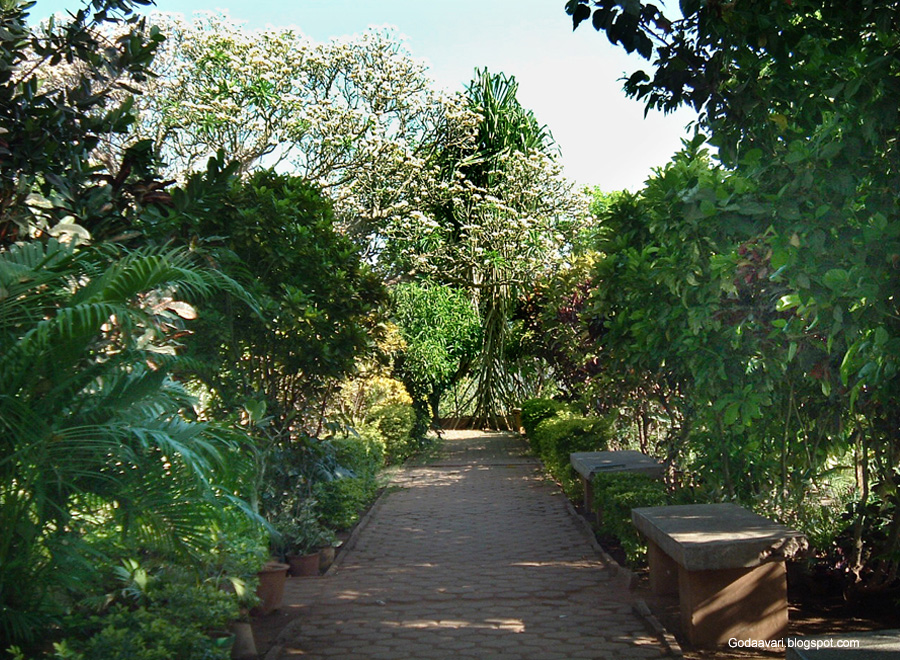
Temple garden

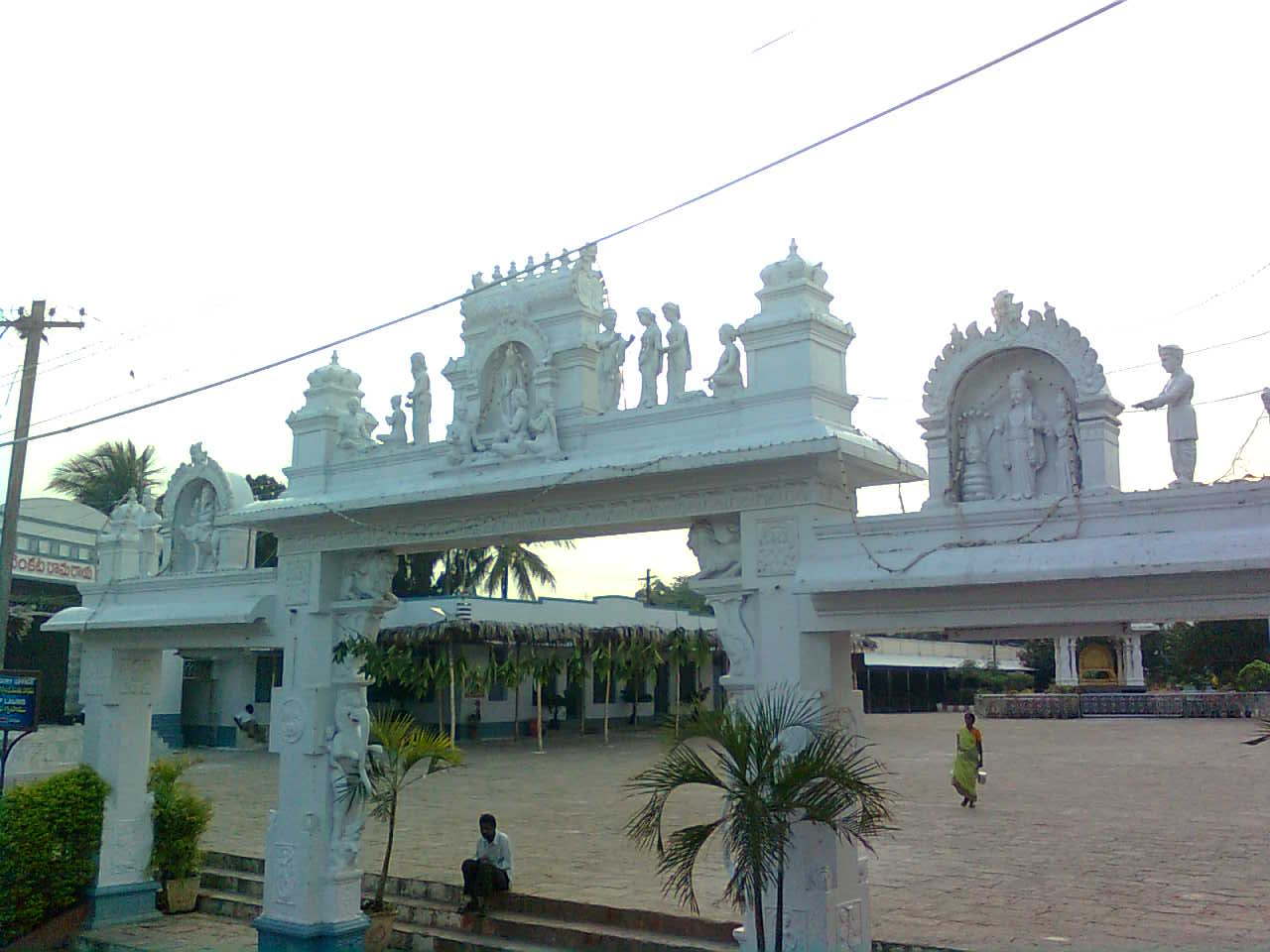
Entrance arch inside the temple

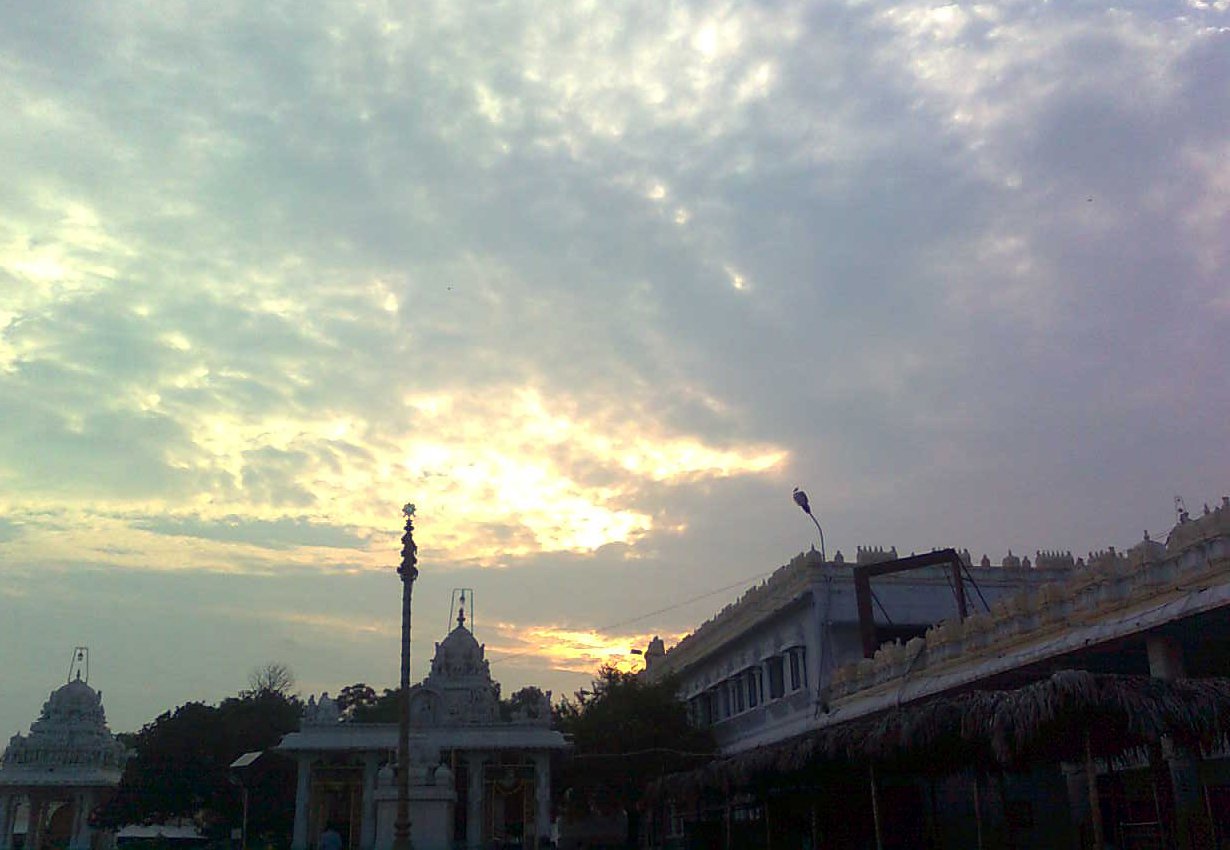
Sunset view of the temple complex

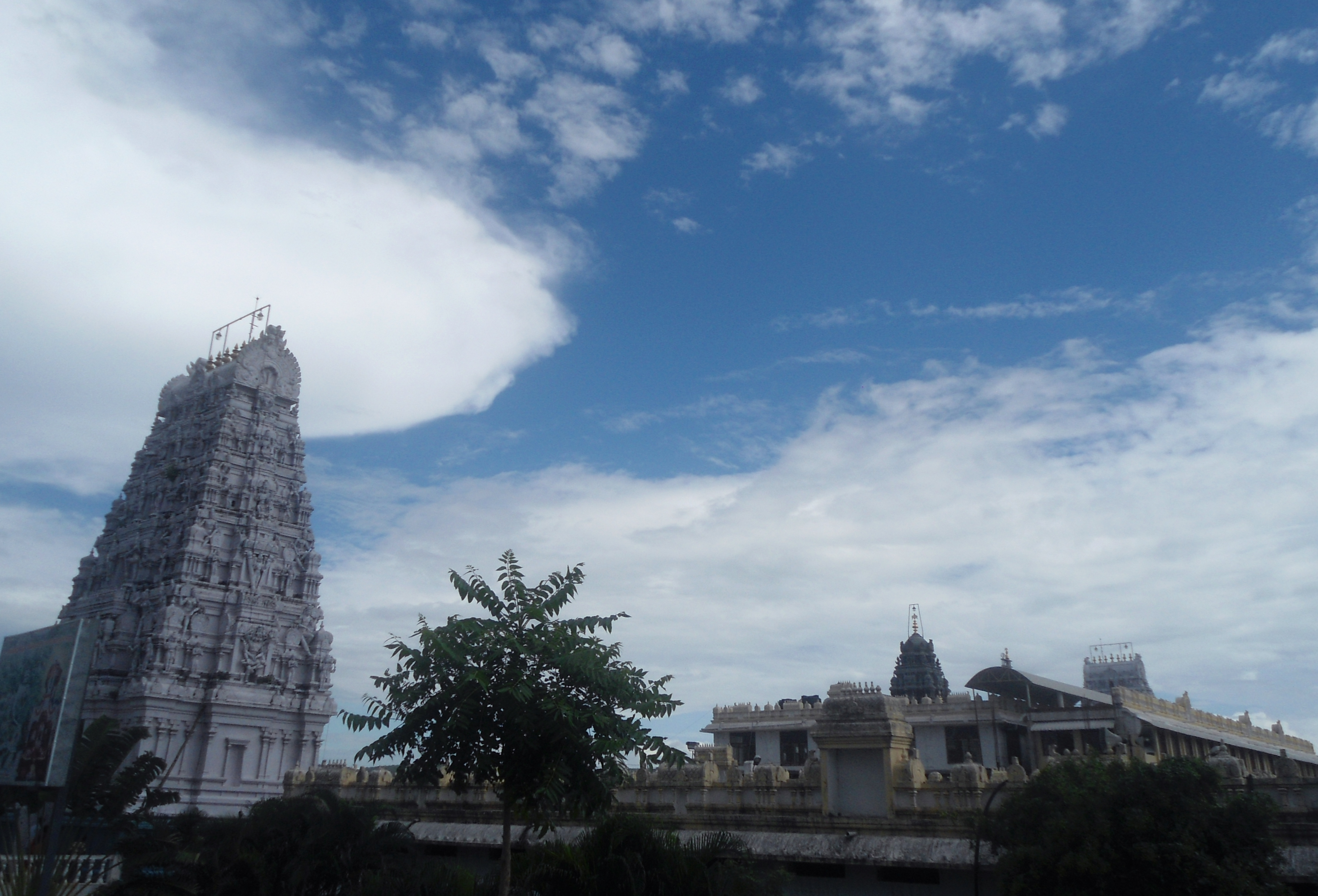
View of the temple complex

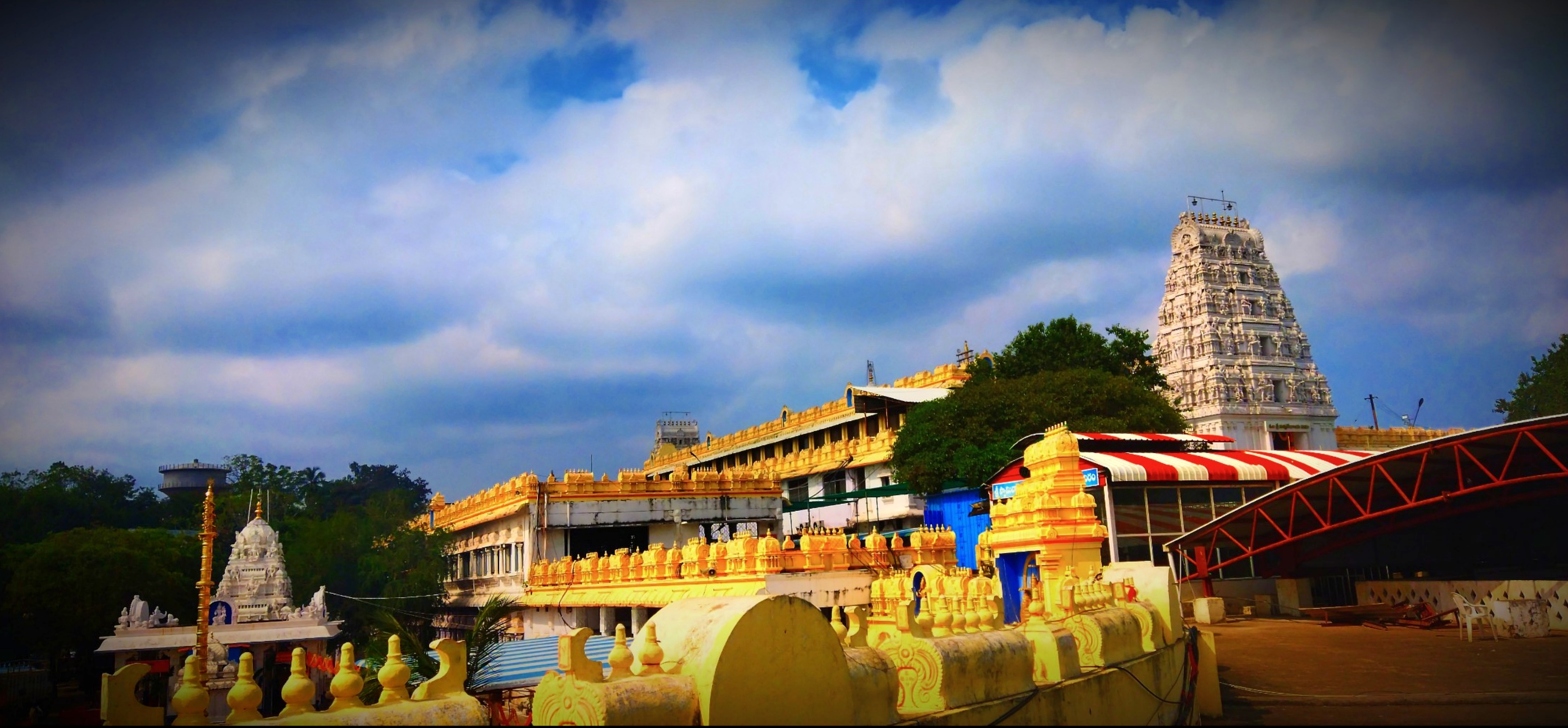
View of the temple complex

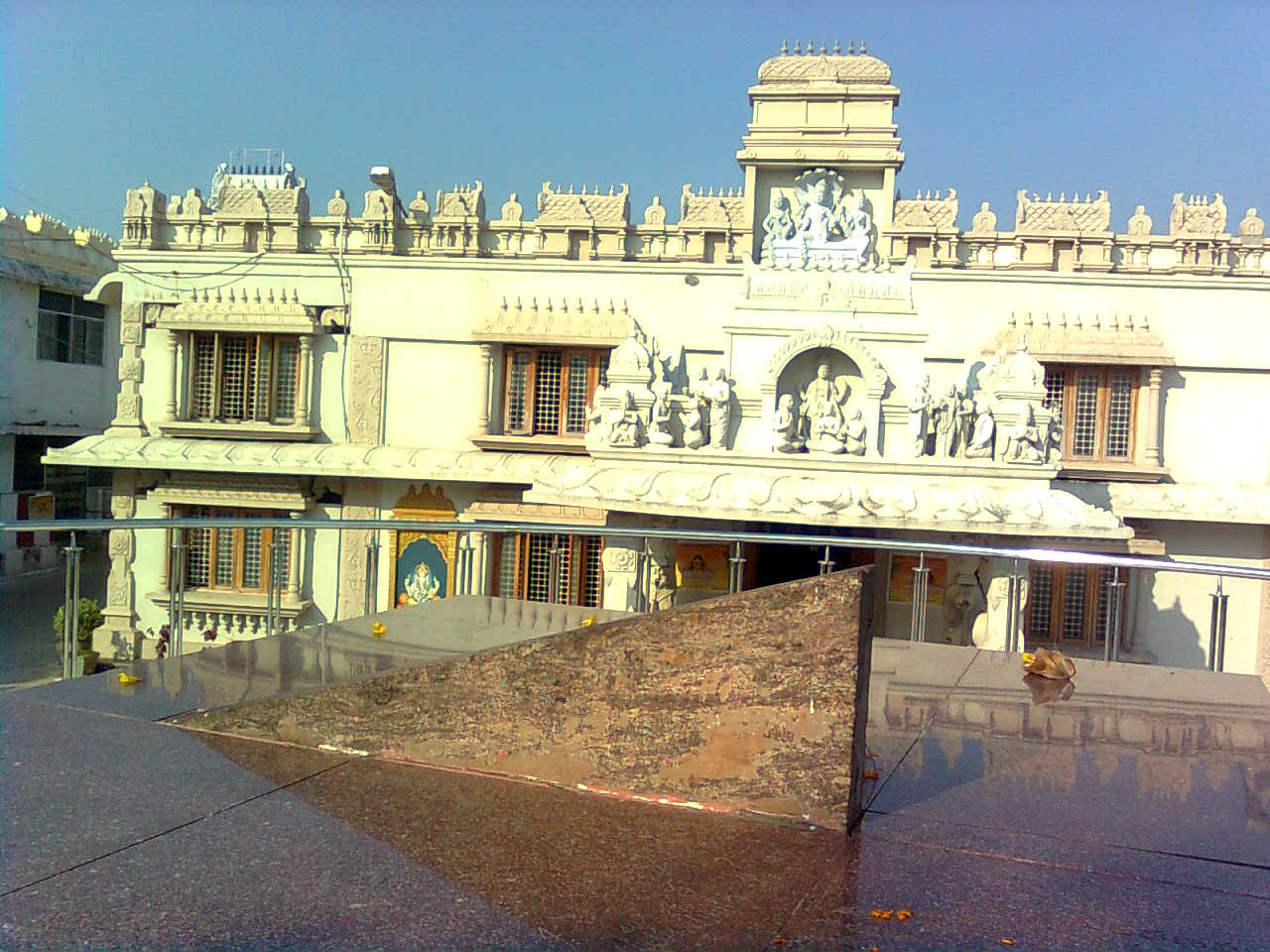
Sundial inside the temple
