= Annavaram, Pedanandipadu mandal =

Annavaram
- village
- Interactive map of Annavaram
- Location within Andhra Pradesh Location within India
- Coordinates: 16°05′15″N 80°16′00″E
- Country: India
- State: Andhra Pradesh
- District: Guntur
- Mandal: Pedanandipadu

Languages
  - Official: Telugu
- Time zone: UTC+5:30 (IST)
- Postal code: 522301
- Vehicle registration: AP

Annavaram is a village in Pedanandipadu mandal in Guntur district of Andhra Pradesh, India. It is located 50 kilometres (31 mi) from Guntur, the district capital, and 11 kilometres (6.8 mi) from Pedanandipadu.
