= Annavaram, West Godavari =

Annavaram
- village
- Interactive map of Annavaram
- Location of Bhimavaram mandal in Andhra Pradesh, India Annavaram (India)
- Coordinates: 16.571500°N 81.509768°E
- Country: India
- State: Andhra Pradesh
- District: West Godavari
- Mandal: Bhimavaram

Population (2011)
  - Total: 1,396

Languages
  - Official: Telugu
- Time zone: UTC+5:30 (IST)
- PIN: 534 202
- Telephone code: 08812

Annavaram is a village in West Godavari district in the state of Andhra Pradesh in India.

== Demographics ==
As of 2011 India census, Annavaram has a population of 1396 of which 697 are males while 699 are females. The average sex ratio of Annavaram village is 1003. The child population is 128, which makes up 9.17% of the total population of the village, with sex ratio 969. In 2011, the literacy rate of Annavaram village was 74.37% when compared to 67.02% of Andhra Pradesh.

== See also ==
- Eluru
