= Annavaram =

Temple town in Andhra Pradesh, India

- Village
- Location in Andhra Pradesh, India
- Coordinates: 17.2833°N 82.3833°E
- Country: India
- State: Andhra Pradesh
- District: Kakinada

Area
  - Total: 324 ha (800 acres)

Population (2011)
  - Total: 6,865
  - Density: 2,120/km^{2} (5,490/sq mi)
- Time zone: UTC+5:30 (IST)
- PIN: 533406

Annavaram is a village in the Kakinada district of the Indian state of Andhra Pradesh, renowned for its religious and cultural significance. The village is best known for the Sri Veera Venkata Satyanarayana Swamy Temple, dedicated to Lord Satyanarayana, an incarnation of Vishnu. Situated on Ratnagiri Hill, the temple, constructed initially in 1891 and rebuilt in 1933–34, is a major pilgrimage site in Andhra Pradesh and is second only to the Tirumala Venkateswara Temple in terms of prominence. The temple's unique rituals, especially the collective Satyanarayana Vratam, attract thousands of devotees, particularly during the Karthika month.

Annavaram is located approximately 18 km from Tuni, 51 km from Kakinada and 120 km from Visakhapatnam, with access via National Highway 16 and a B-category railway station on the Howrah–Chennai main line. According to the 2011 Census, the village has a population of 6,865. The village hosts a range of educational facilities and basic healthcare services, although more comprehensive medical care is available in nearby towns.

== Etymology ==
The name Annavaram is derived from the Telugu word Anna, meaning food, symbolizing the village's longstanding status as a hub for food distribution. Another explanation suggests the origin from Anina varam (bestowed boon), referring to the divine blessings said to be granted by the presiding deity of the temple.

== Location ==
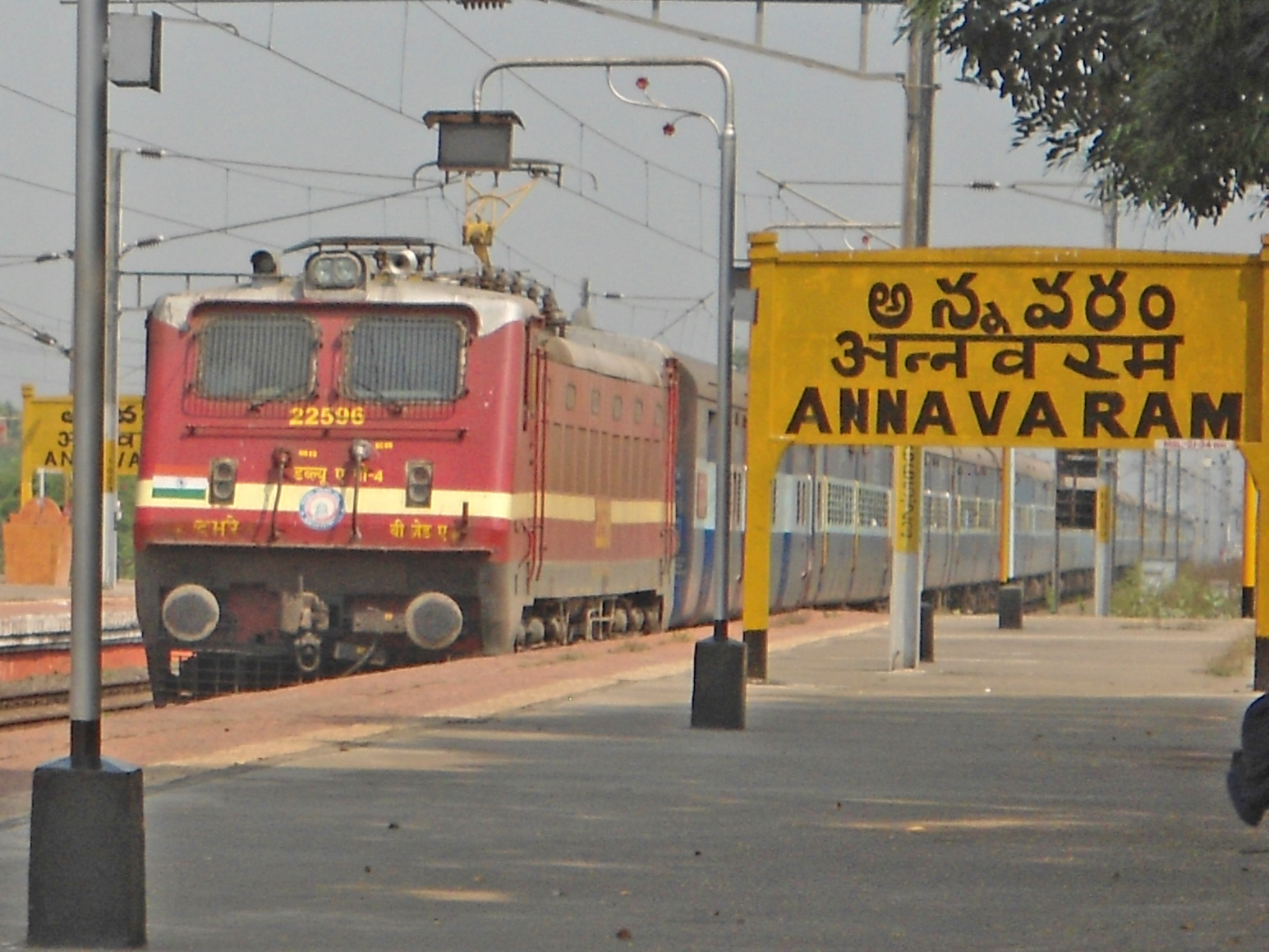
Annavaram railway station

Annavaram is located 18 km from Tuni, 51 km from Kakinada, 72 km from Rajahmundry, and 120 km from Visakhapatnam. The town is accessible via National Highway 16 (NH16), which connects Chennai and Kolkata.

Annavaram bus station serves the town. Regular bus services operated by the Andhra Pradesh State Road Transport Corporation (APSRTC) connect Annavaram with nearby cities, including buses running every 30 minutes from Tuni, Kakinada and Rajahmundry.

The Annavaram railway station, situated on the Howrah–Chennai main line, is a B-category station under the Vijayawada railway division of the South Central Railway zone. Located about 3 km from the temple, it lies on the broad-gauge railway line between Vijayawada and Visakhapatnam. Many trains on the Kolkata-Vijayawada route have a scheduled stop at Annavaram.

== Demographics ==
According to the 2011 Census of India, Annavaram spans an area of 324 hectares with a population of 6,865, encompassing 1,835 households. The male population totals 3,458 and the female population is 3,407, resulting in a nearly balanced sex ratio. The village includes 269 individuals from Scheduled Castes and 5 from Scheduled Tribes. The PIN code for Annavaram is 533406.

As per the Census 2011, the literacy rate of Annavaram is 75.1%. The male literacy rate is 81.09% and the female literacy rate is 69.05% in Annavaram village.

== Religious Significance ==
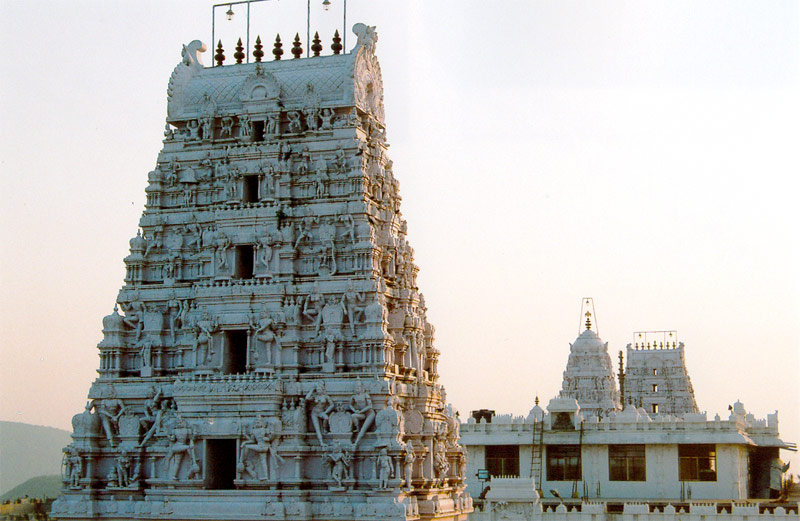
Gopuram of Satynarayana Swamy Temple

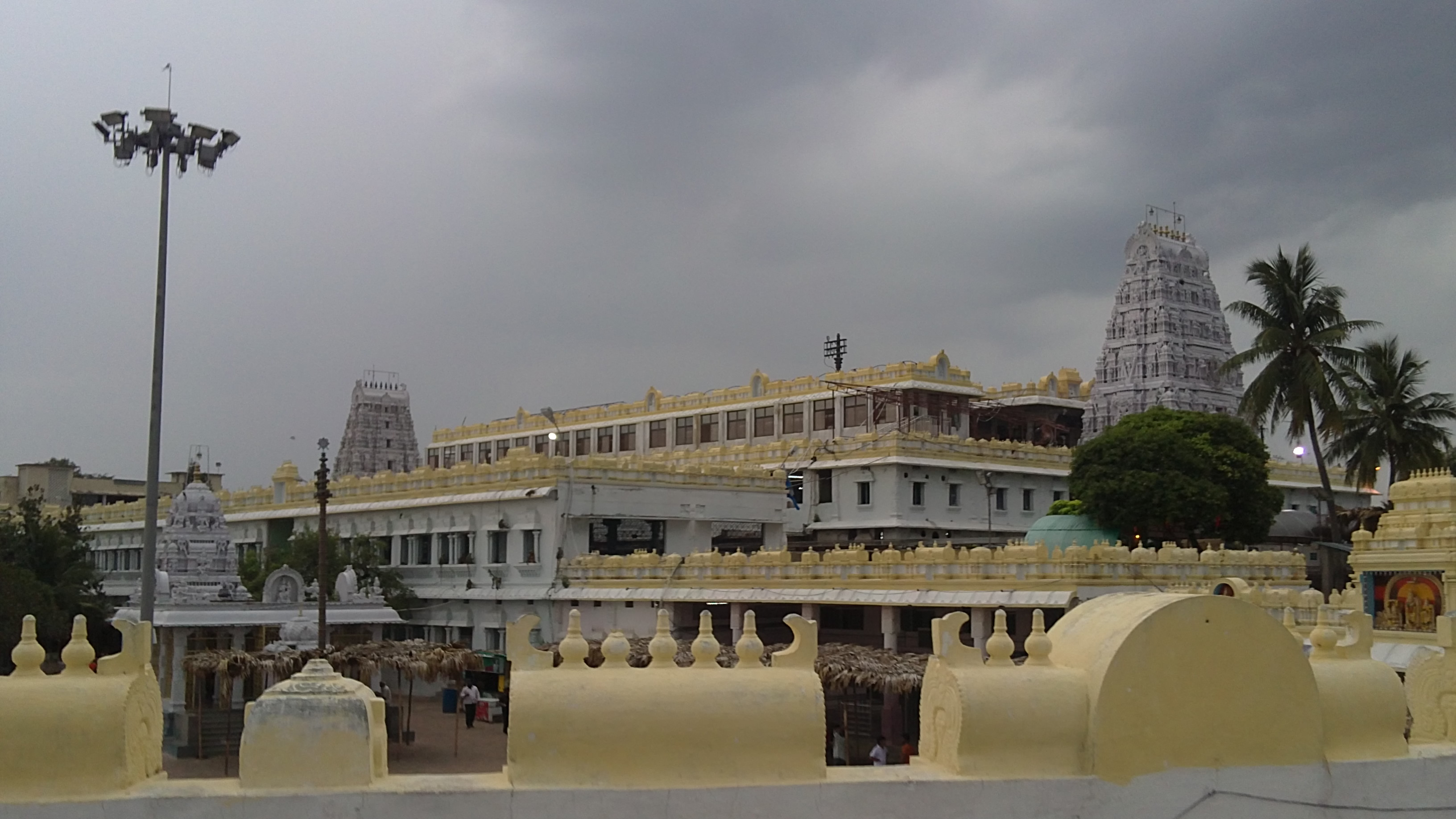
View of the entire temple

Annavaram is widely known for its religious significance, primarily due to the Sri Veera Venkata Satyanarayana Swamy Temple located atop Ratnagiri Hill. Dedicated to Lord Satyanarayana, an incarnation of the Hindu god Vishnu, the temple was initially constructed in 1891 and later reconstructed in stone during 1933–34. The temple features unique iconography and attracts numerous visitors, making it one of the most frequented and wealthiest religious sites in Andhra Pradesh. It is considered the second most important pilgrimage centre in the state after the Tirumala Venkateswara Temple.

The temple's location on Ratnagiri Hill provides a scenic view overlooking the Pampa River and the surrounding landscape. Pilgrims can reach the temple via a ghat road or by climbing a series of steps. The temple is particularly known for the collective performance of the Satyanarayana Vratam, a ritual observed by hundreds of devotees at once, which fosters a strong sense of community. The month of Karthika is notable for drawing large numbers of worshippers who participate in special rituals and celebrations.

A legend associated with the temple recounts the story of Meru, a great mountain, and his wife Menaka, who were blessed by Vishnu after performing penance. Their sons, Bhadra and Ratnakara, were transformed into Bhadrachalam Hill, dedicated to Lord Rama, and Ratnagiri, where Lord Satyanarayana manifested. This legend underlines the temple's significance, with devotees believing in the blessings (anina varam) received from the deity, enhancing Annavaram's religious importance.

== Education ==
Annavaram hosts a range of educational institutions, including one private kindergarten, three government primary schools, two private primary schools, one government upper primary school, one private upper primary school, one government secondary school, and one private secondary school. Higher education is available at one government junior college, one private junior college, and one private arts and science degree college.

The nearest engineering, medical, management, and polytechnic colleges are located in Kakinada. Vocational training centers are accessible in Jaggampeta, while specialized schools for disabled students are available in Kakinada.

== Healthcare ==
Public healthcare facilities in Annavaram are limited. The village has two sub-centers without doctors but staffed by paramedics. The nearest primary health center is located within a 5–10 km radius. Other healthcare options include veterinary and mobile health services within the same distance. More comprehensive medical facilities, such as community health centers, maternal and child health services, allopathy hospitals, and centers for alternative medicine, are located more than 10 km away.

Annavaram has two private healthcare facilities and three unqualified practitioners providing services. There are ten pharmacies to meet the needs of the local population.

== Gallery ==
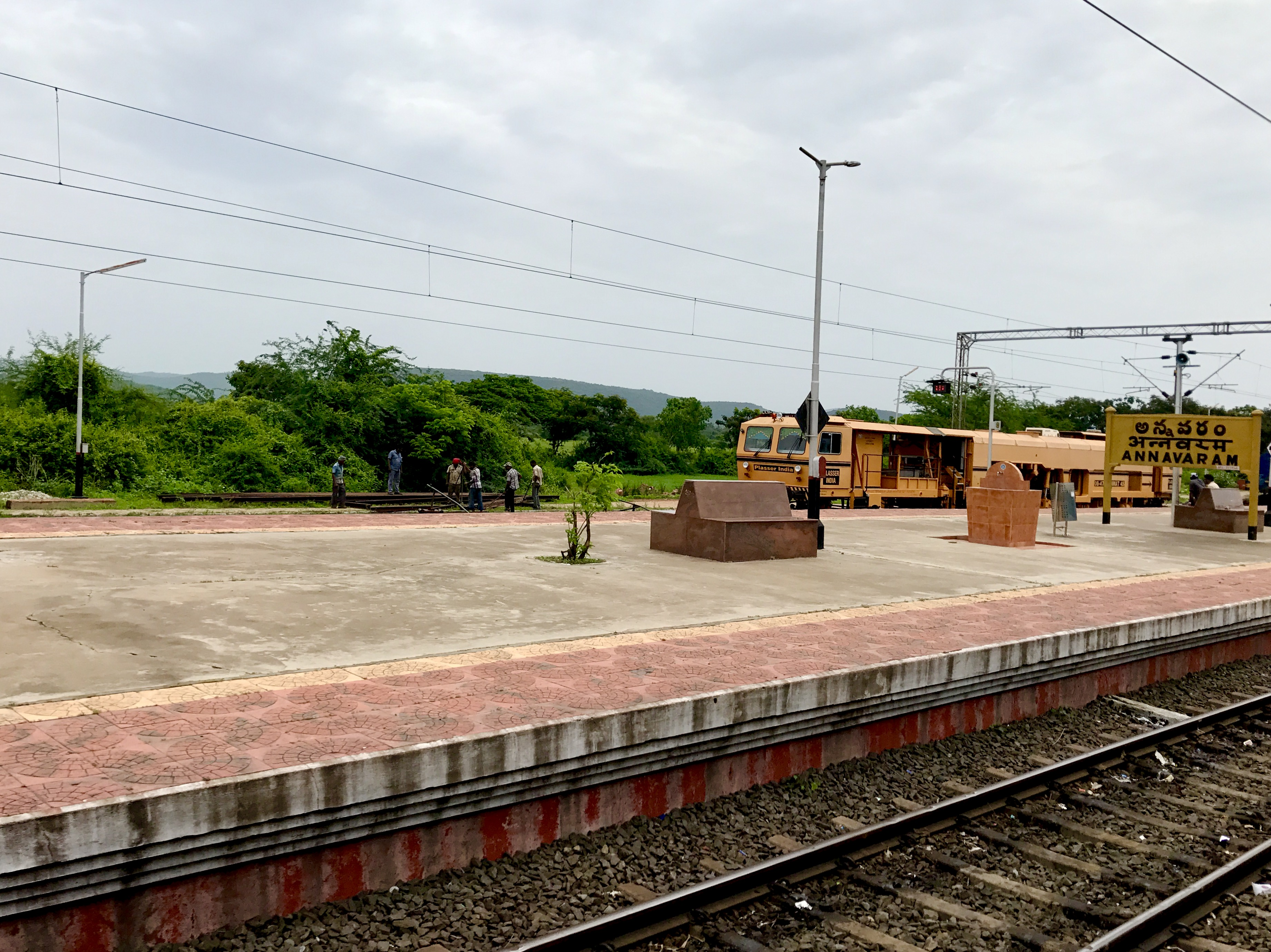
Annavaram railway station

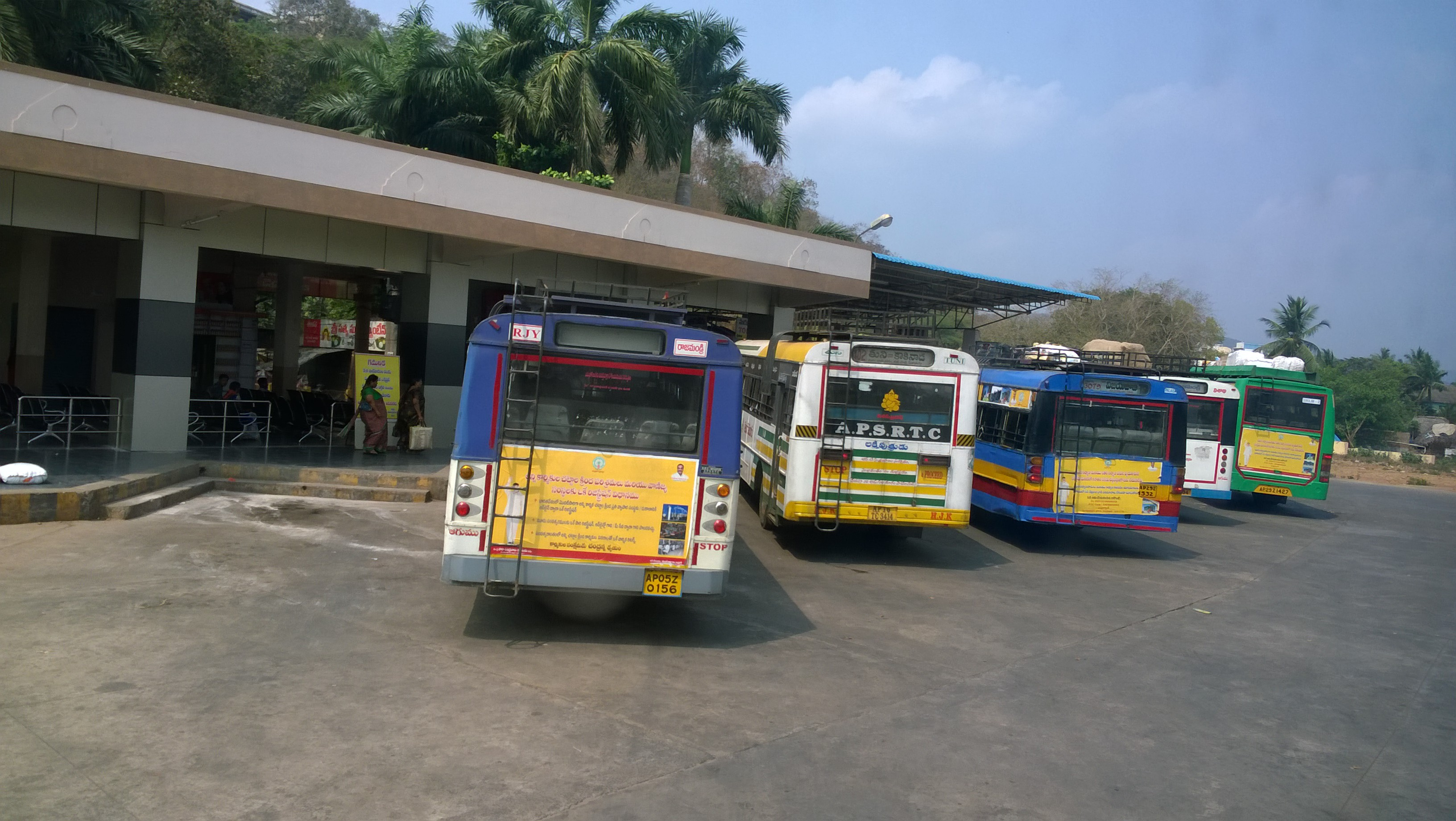
Annavaram bus stand

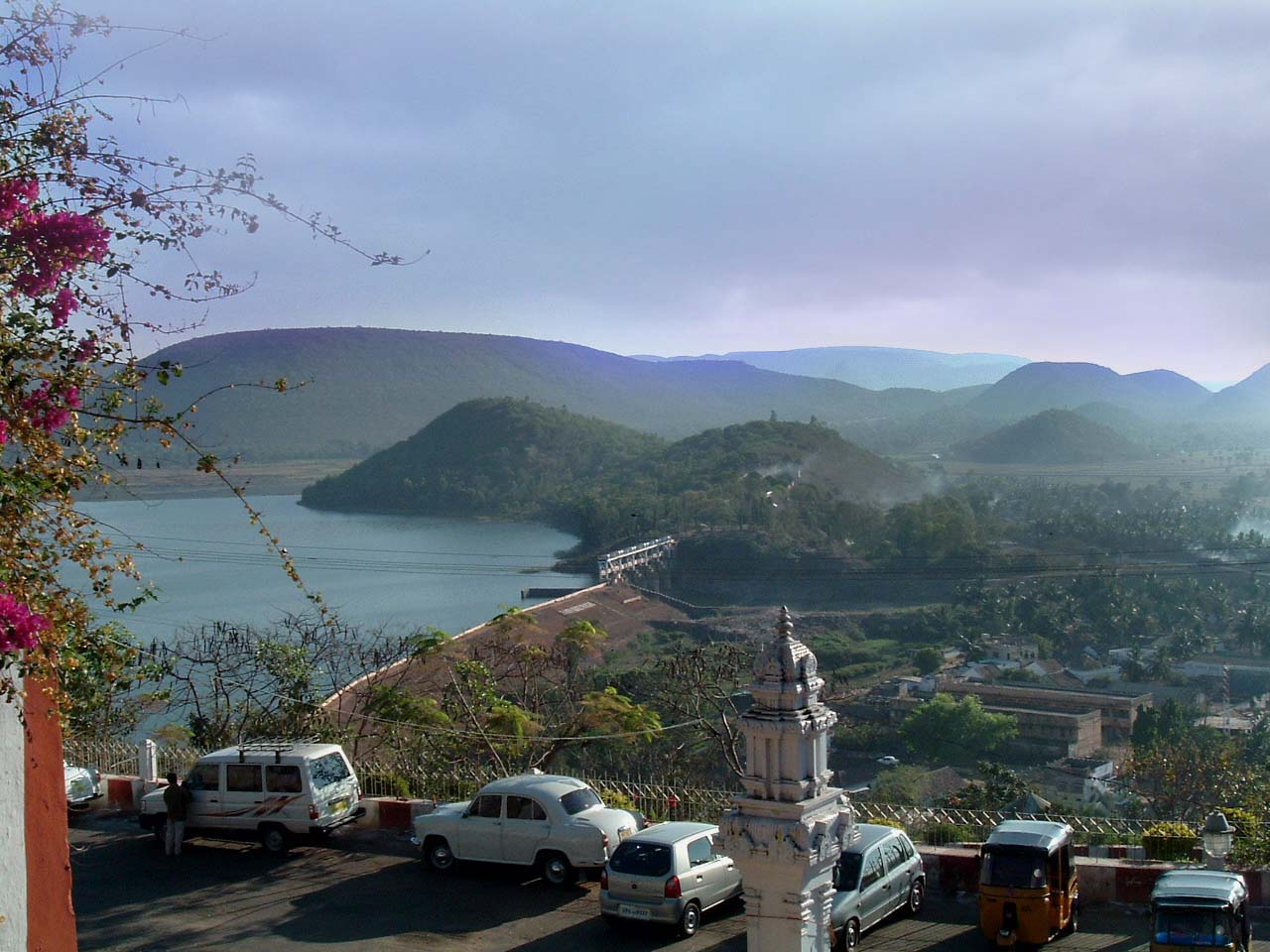
Ratnagiri mountain range

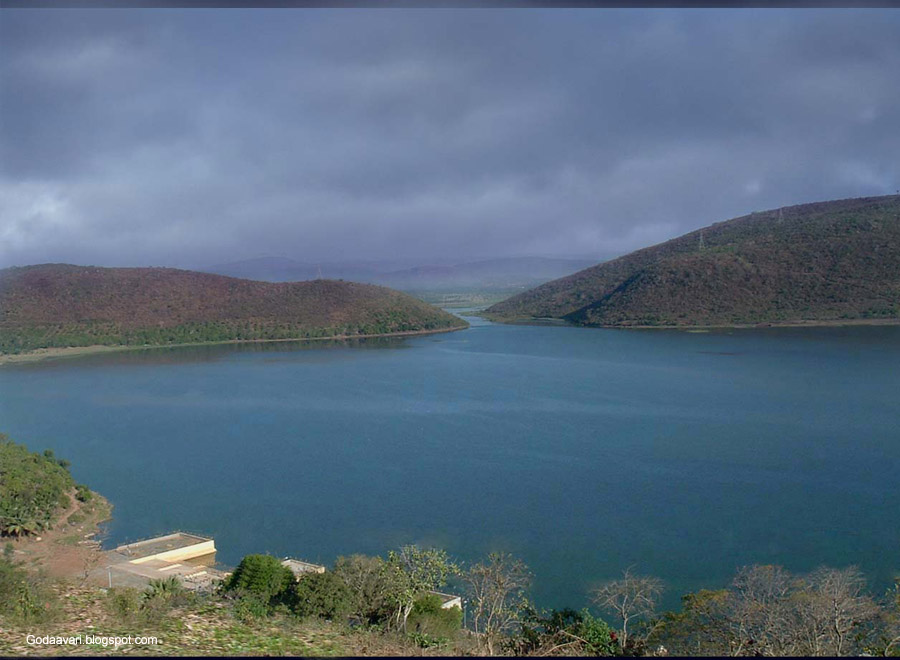
Pushkarini at the temple

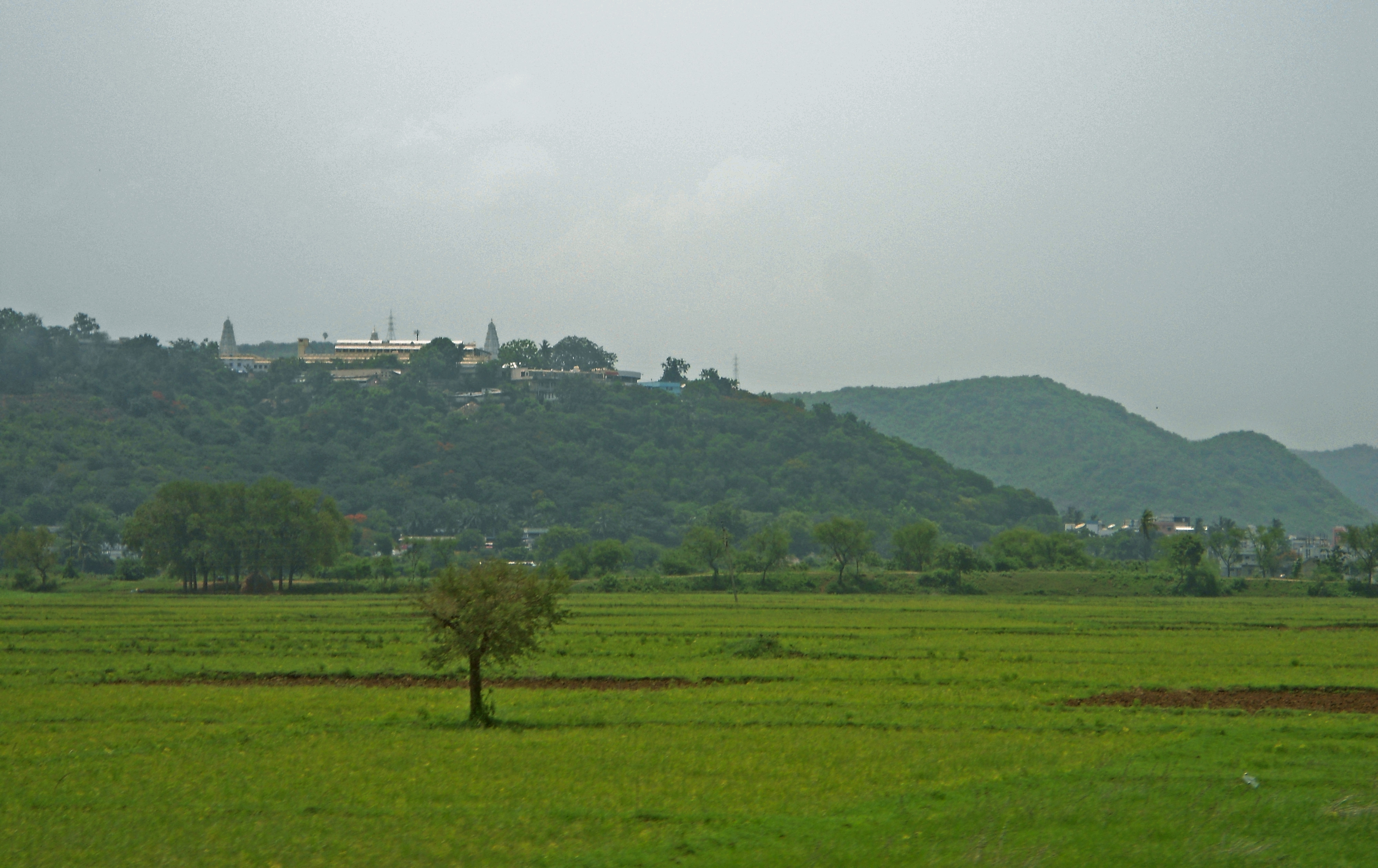
Annavaram hill view

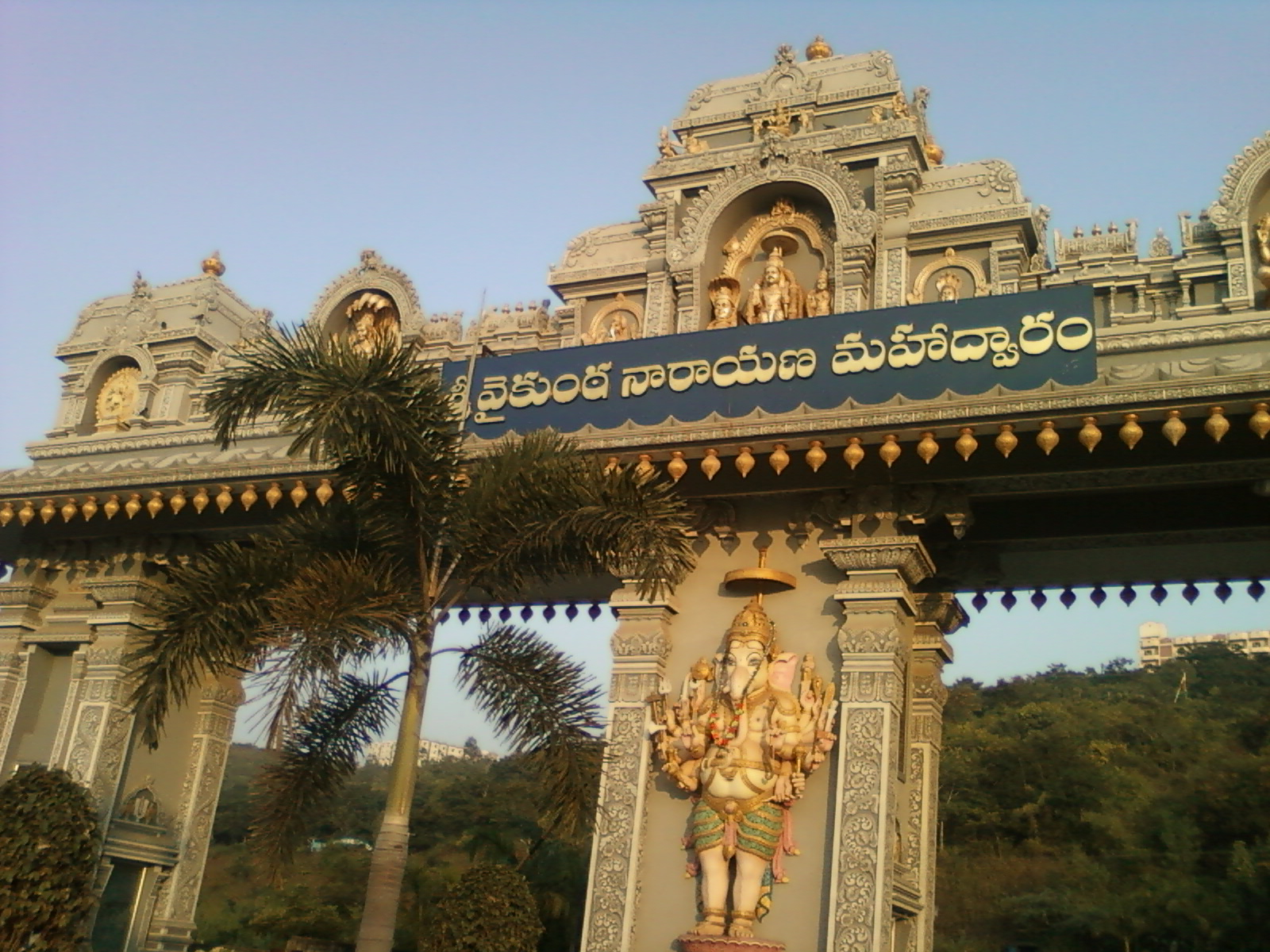
Entrance arch on new Ghat road

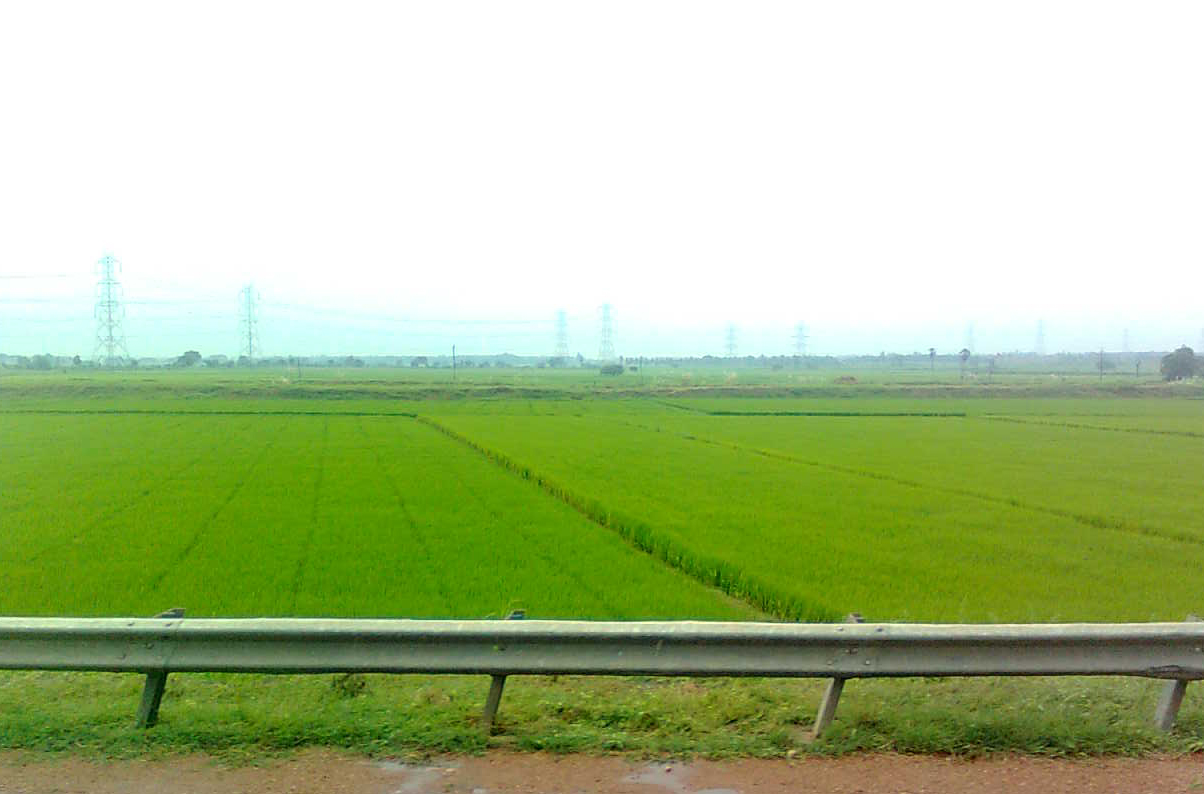
Paddy fields near Annavaram
