= Aleksandr Rudakov =

Aleksandr Rudakov may refer to:

- Aleksandr Rudakov (naval officer) (1817–1875), Russian naval officer
- Aleksandr Rudakov (Party figure) (1910–1966), Soviet politician
