= Red Square, Taganrog =

Square in Taganrog, Russia

Red Square
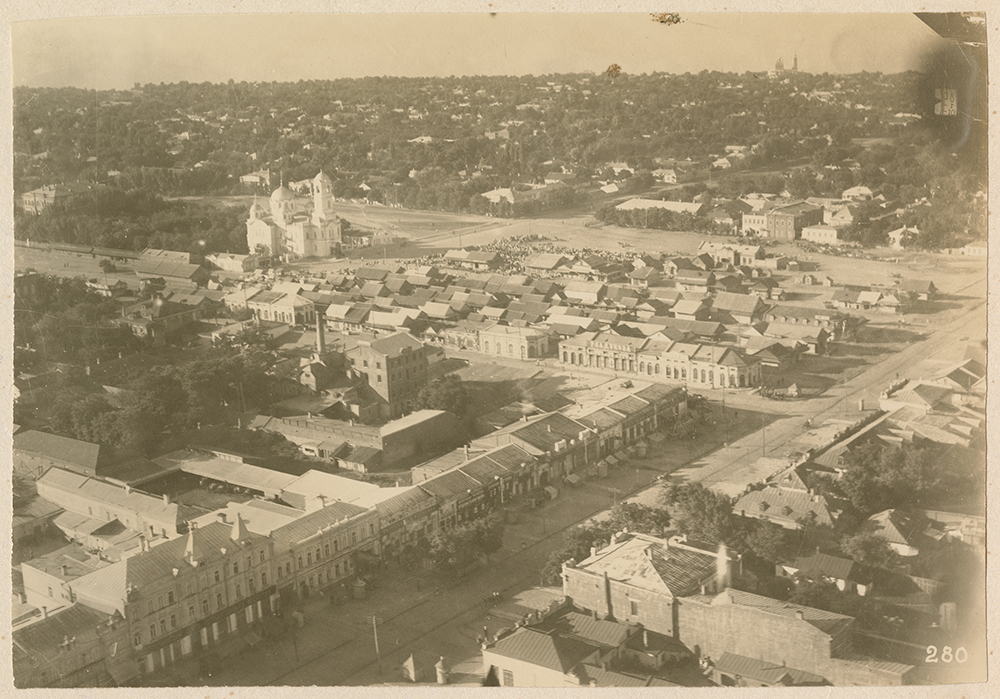
- Interactive map of Red Square
- Location: Taganrog, Russia
- Coordinates: 47.212°N 38.917°E

Red Square (Russian: Красная площадь) is a city square of Taganrog.

== History ==
The city square, "where sale of bread and other things in isolation" was conducted, was decided to be arranged in 1808 on the site where previously there was a marsh covered with reeds. The radial part of the 105th block on this square was part of the unified architectural ensemble of the Trade Rows, built in the 1810s by architect M. I. Campioni.

The area had the shape of an elongated oval with a length of 680 meters and a width of 200 meters.

In the center of the square was a well with good drinking water.

In the 1860s, attempts were made to arrange a garden there, but the project of architect Trusov was not implemented because of the lack of funds from the city budget. Only in 1935, when preparing the celebration of the 75th anniversary of Anton Chekhov, a public garden of about 1.5 hectares was arranged and was named Chekhovsky. After World War II, it was landscaped, and since 1960 it is decorated with the Monument to Anton Chekhov by the sculptor Iulian Rukavishnikov.

In 1923, Alexander Square was renamed the Red Square.
