= List of monuments and memorials in Taganrog =

This is a list of monuments and memorials in Taganrog. Taganrog, on the Black Sea in the Kuban area, Rostov Oblast, of Russia is of high historical importance relative to its small size, and relatedly has unusual memorials. The city was founded, like St. Petersburg later, to provide Russia with a seaport.

== Peter I monument ==
Peter I Monument in Taganrog

== Alexander I monument ==
Only significant monument in Russia to Alexander I, emperor of Russia from 1801 to 1825.

== Checkhov monument ==
Checkhov was born in Taganrog. Chekhov Monument in Taganrog.

== Garibaldi monument ==
Garibaldi sojourned here.
