= Augusta Aasen =

Norwegian politician (1878–1920)

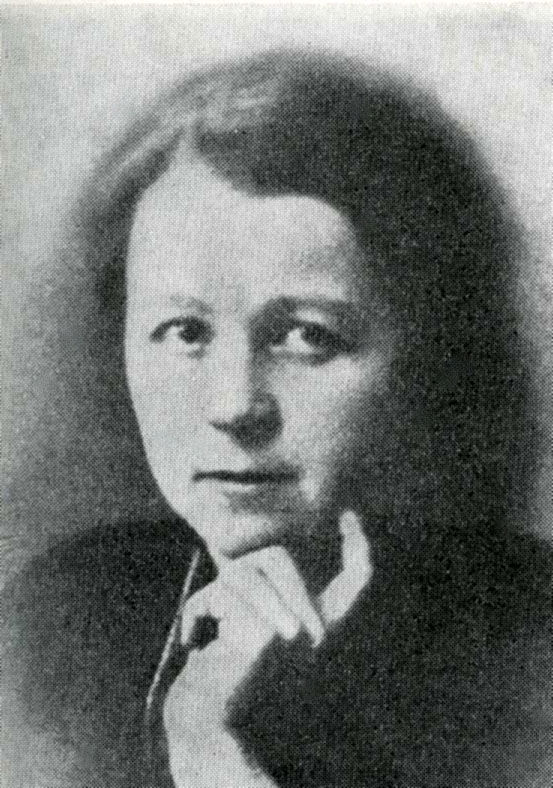
- Born: Augusta Paasche; 19 May 1878; Osen Municipality
- Died: 3 August 1920 (aged 42)
- Resting place: Kremlin Wall Necropolis
- Occupation: Politician
- Years active: 1908-1920
- Political party: Labour Party
- Children: Arne Paasche Aasen

Augusta Aasen, née Paasche (19 May 1878 – 3 August 1920) was a Norwegian politician for the Labour Party.

She was born in Osen Municipality as a daughter of Fredrik Christian Paasche and Pauline Sivertsdatter Vaagen. Together with book printer Edolf Aasen (1877–1969), she had a son Arne Paasche Aasen, a well-known poet.

She hailed from Steinkjer Municipality, and was a member of the municipal council for Trondhjem Municipality from 1908 to 1911. She was the first female council member in Norway's third largest city. She then moved to Kristiania and was a secretary in Norges Socialdemokratiske Ungdomsforbund from 1912 to 1914. She also worked in the newspaper Direkte Aktion.

Politically, she was a board member of Kristiania Labour Party, and a deputy board member of the central board. In 1920, she was the only female Norwegian delegate to the Second Comintern Congress. Here she died at the airport when she was hit by an airplane propeller. She was buried in the Kremlin Wall Necropolis (Mass Grave No. 9) as the only Norwegian woman buried there.
