= Reidar Bøe =

Norwegian singer and composer

- Born: 7 May 1921; Bergen, Norway
- Died: 9 August 1969 (aged 48)
- Occupations: Singer; Composer

Reidar Bøe (7 May 1921 – 9 August 1969) was a Norwegian singer and composer.

He was born in Bergen, and is known for his collaboration with Kurt Foss. He made his stage debut at Den nationale scene in 1939, and also participated in radio shows. Bøe and Foss made their record debut in 1947 with the song "Grønlandsvisa". The song "Blåveispiken", with lyrics by Arne Paasche Aasen, recorded in 1950 by Bøe and accompanied by Foss, sold more than 100,000 copies, and was frequently played in the radio show Ønskekonserten (listeners' choice).
