= Alexandrovskiye Trade Rows =

Coordinates: 47°12′41″N 38°55′21″E

Alexandrovskiye Trade Rows (Russian: Александровские торговые ряды) in Taganrog is a piece of architecture of the 19th century. Their construction took place in 1840s, the author of the project – architect M. Campinioni.

== History ==
Initially this architectural ensemble consisted of the two identical single-storey buildings semicircling the Alexandrovskaya Square (now Red Square), but being dissected by the street currently bearing the name of Chekhov. The concave facades constituted the solid high gallery arcades with austere Doric columns. Deep in the apertures between the columns there were shops, each had a front door and two windows; a back door led to a spacious yard. In the high plinth there were entries into deep cellars. The continuous line of stairs of the gallery, as well as the massive entablature crowning the edifice, emphasized the integrity of the entire ensemble. The structure looked like an antique temple rather than a shopping center. The rightmost stall near the Soborniy (Red) Pereulok was rented by Anton Chekhov’s father in 1874–1876. His uncle Ivan Loboda also had a shop there. Since some of the stalls were empty, the trade activities were concentrated in the right part of the rows, the rest was sold for lodging (the left side of Chekhov street, No 107–119). In 1911 the integrity of the right gallery was damaged by the construction of the two-storey building housing a leather goods shop (Chekhov street, 98). In 1921 just over the former Pavel Chekhov’s stall, the sculpture group was installed; it symbolized the union of workers and peasants (sculpted by Navratil from Czechoslovakia). In the course of repair work in 1966, it was removed from the edifice. In 1935 for the 75th birth anniversary of Anton Chekhov the territory was transformed into a public square. During the WWII the structure was damaged by a bomb; many apertures were bricked. The intact quarters are still in use.

In 1960, for the 100th birth anniversary, the Chekhov Monument in Taganrog was inaugurated right in the Red Square facing the Chekhov Street and the historical downtown Taganrog.

The restoration work of the part of the former Alexandrovskiye Trade Rows was completed in 2007.

== Old and Modern Views ==
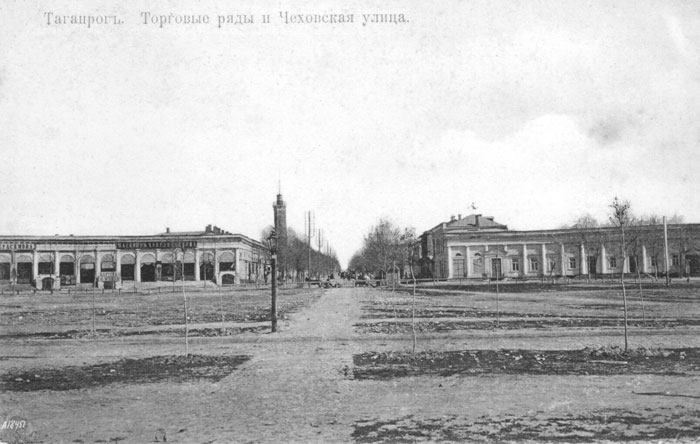
Alexandrovskiye Trade Rows on an old postcard, late 19th century.

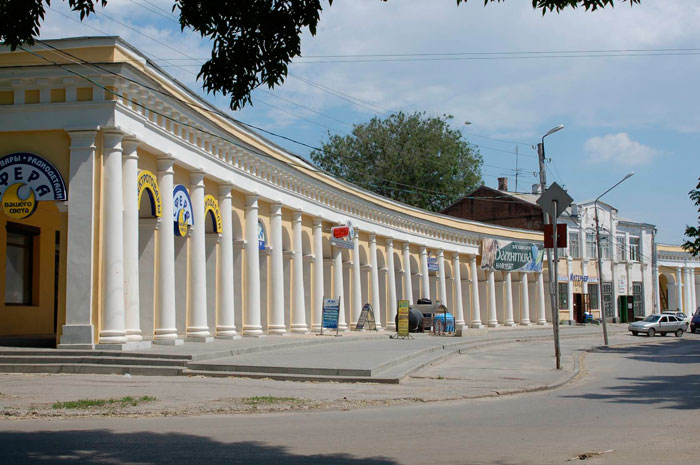
Alexandrovskiye Trade Rows in 2006.

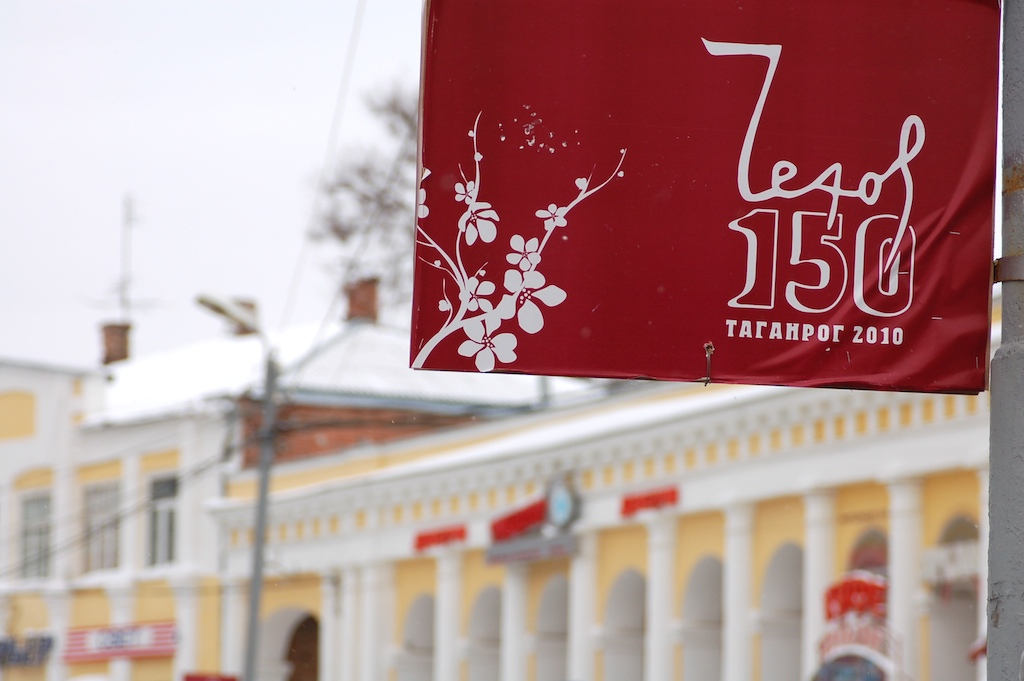
The logo of the 150th Anton Chekhov birth anniversary year. Photographed on birthday of the Russian writer on 29 January 2010, with Alexandrovskie Trade Rows in the background.
