= Pantheon, Moscow =

Planned but uncompleted memorial tomb

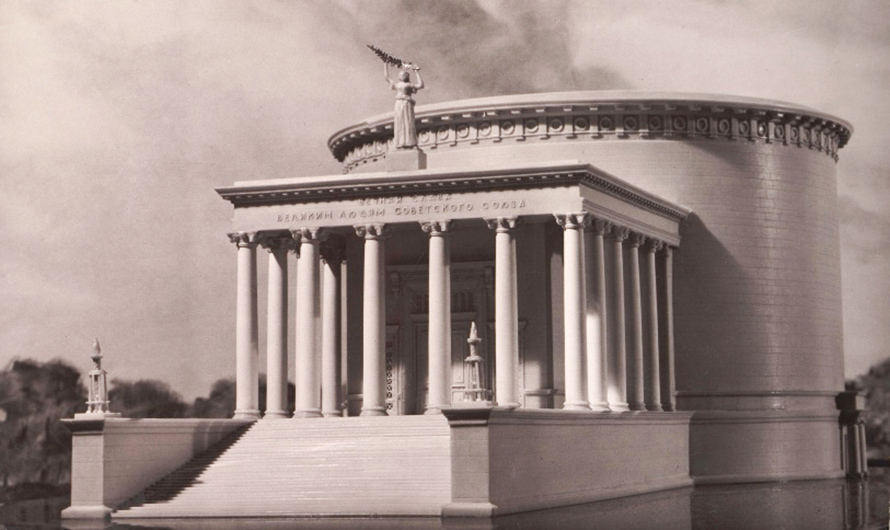
One design for the Pantheon

The Pantheon (Russian: Пантеон), officially also called the Monument to the Eternal Glory of the Great People of the Soviet Land (Russian: Памятник вечной славы великих людей Советской страны), was a project to construct a monumental memorial tomb in Moscow, Soviet Union. The tomb was planned to serve as the final resting place for prominent communist figures along with the remains of Communists who had been buried at the Kremlin Wall Necropolis. According to the plan, Vladimir Lenin's embalmed body would be transferred from Lenin's Mausoleum to the new Pantheon.

The decision to build the Pantheon was taken by the Central Committee of the CPSU and Council of Ministers in a joint decision of March 6, 1953, the day following Joseph Stalin's death. It was decided that the Pantheon would be built in Moscow, but its location was not further specified. A likely location would probably have been opposite the Kremlin, on the Sophie quay by the Moscow River. The project was partly inspired by the Panthéon in Paris, and the idea was to transfer all the remains buried at the Kremlin Wall Necropolis, and convert the Lenin Mausoleum into a monumental tribune overlooking Red Square. According to the decision, the Pantheon would be accessible to broad masses of visitors.

The decision to build the Pantheon was never executed. Its fate may be connected with the turning point of Stalinist architectural projects after Stalin's death, and with the official condemnation of Joseph Stalin, whose body was removed from the Lenin Mausoleum on October 31, 1961, and buried next to the Kremlin Wall at the Kremlin Wall Necropolis. The decision of 1953 was further invalidated on December 4, 1974, when the Ministerial Council of the Russian SFSR decided to formally protect the historical monuments of the Lenin Mausoleum and the Kremlin Wall Necropolis.

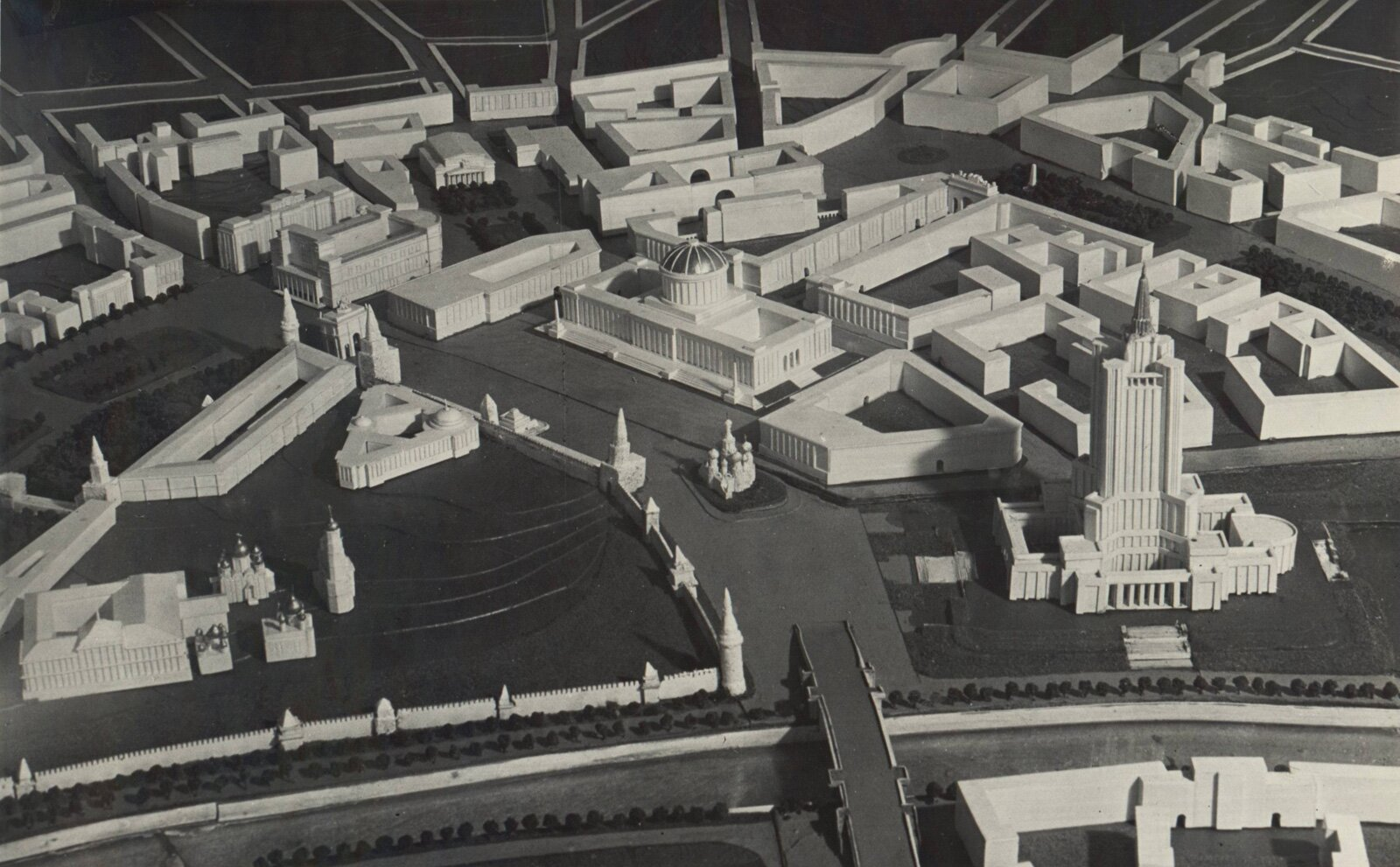

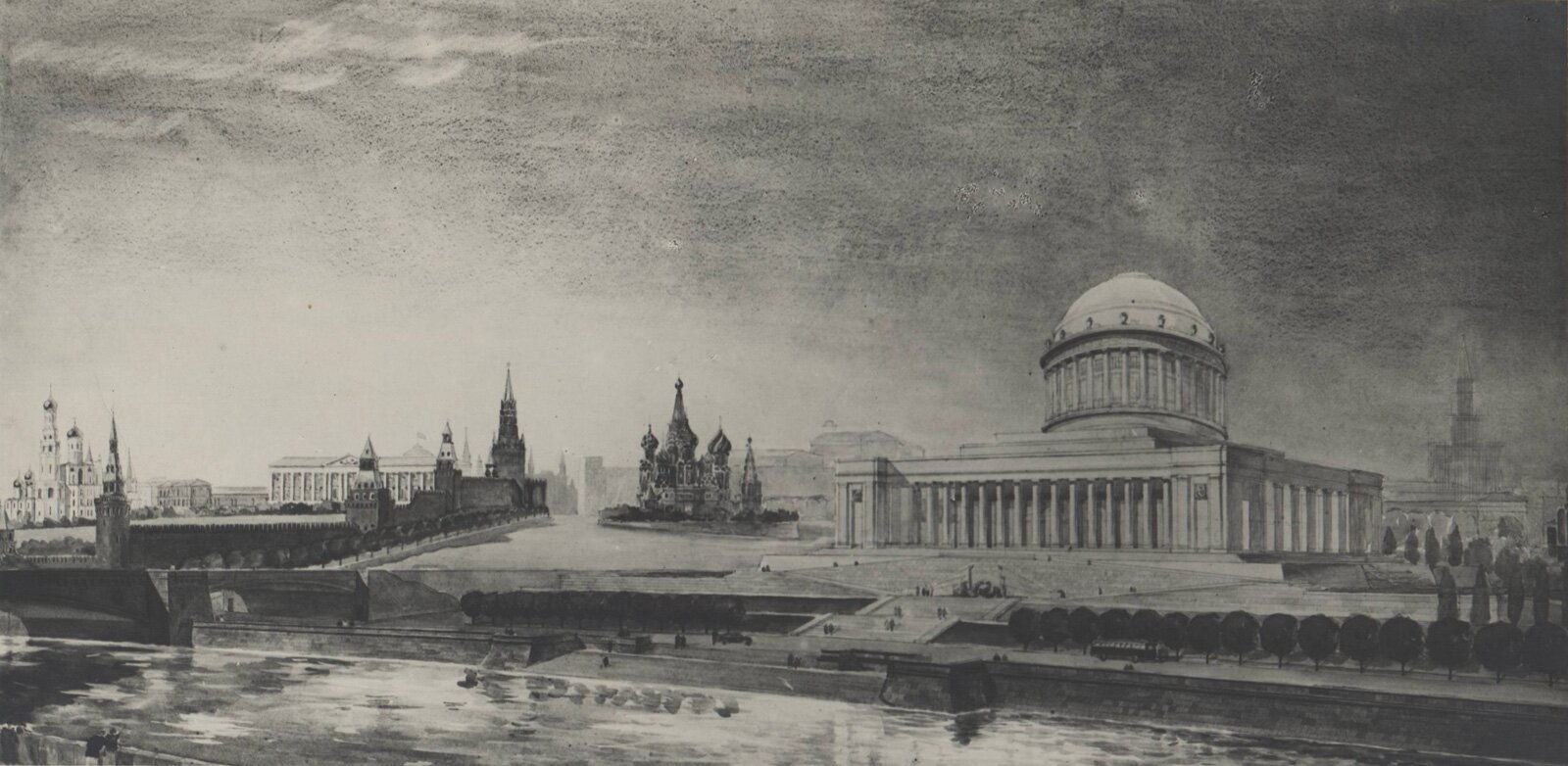

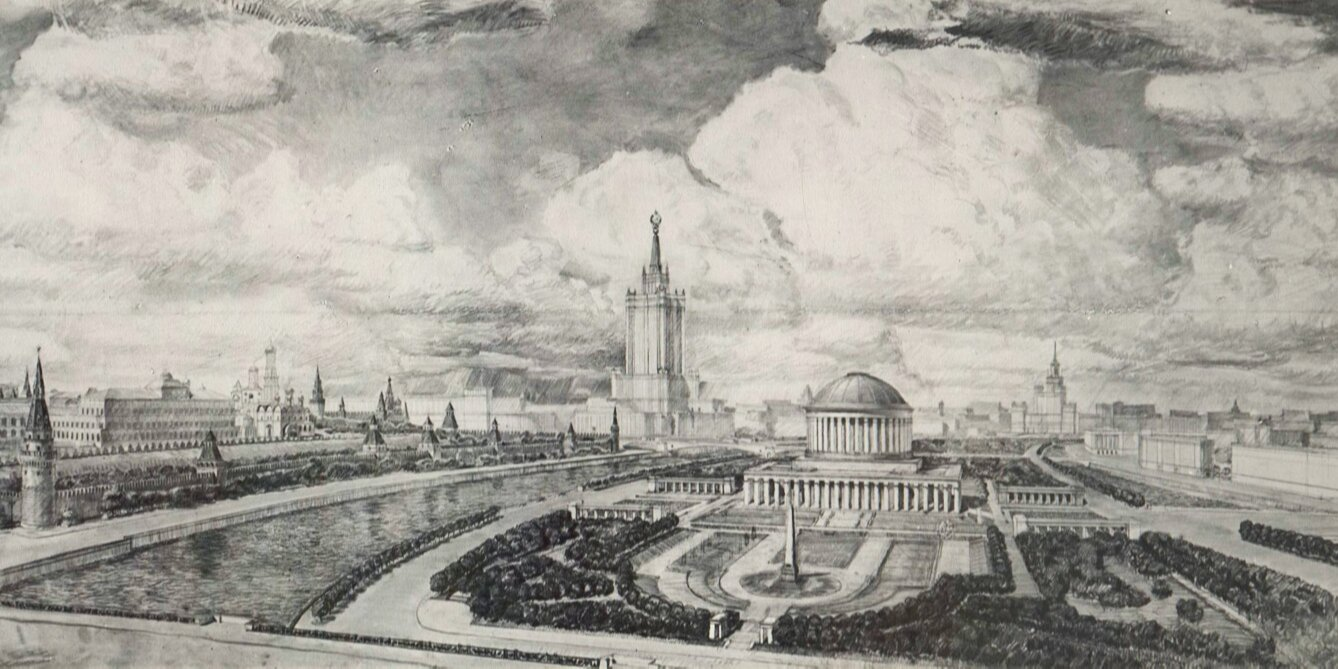
Different designs' locations

== See also ==
- Pantheon, Rome
- Panthéon
- Palace of Soviets
- Tatlin's Tower
