= Arne Paasche Aasen =

Norwegian politician, journalist and poet

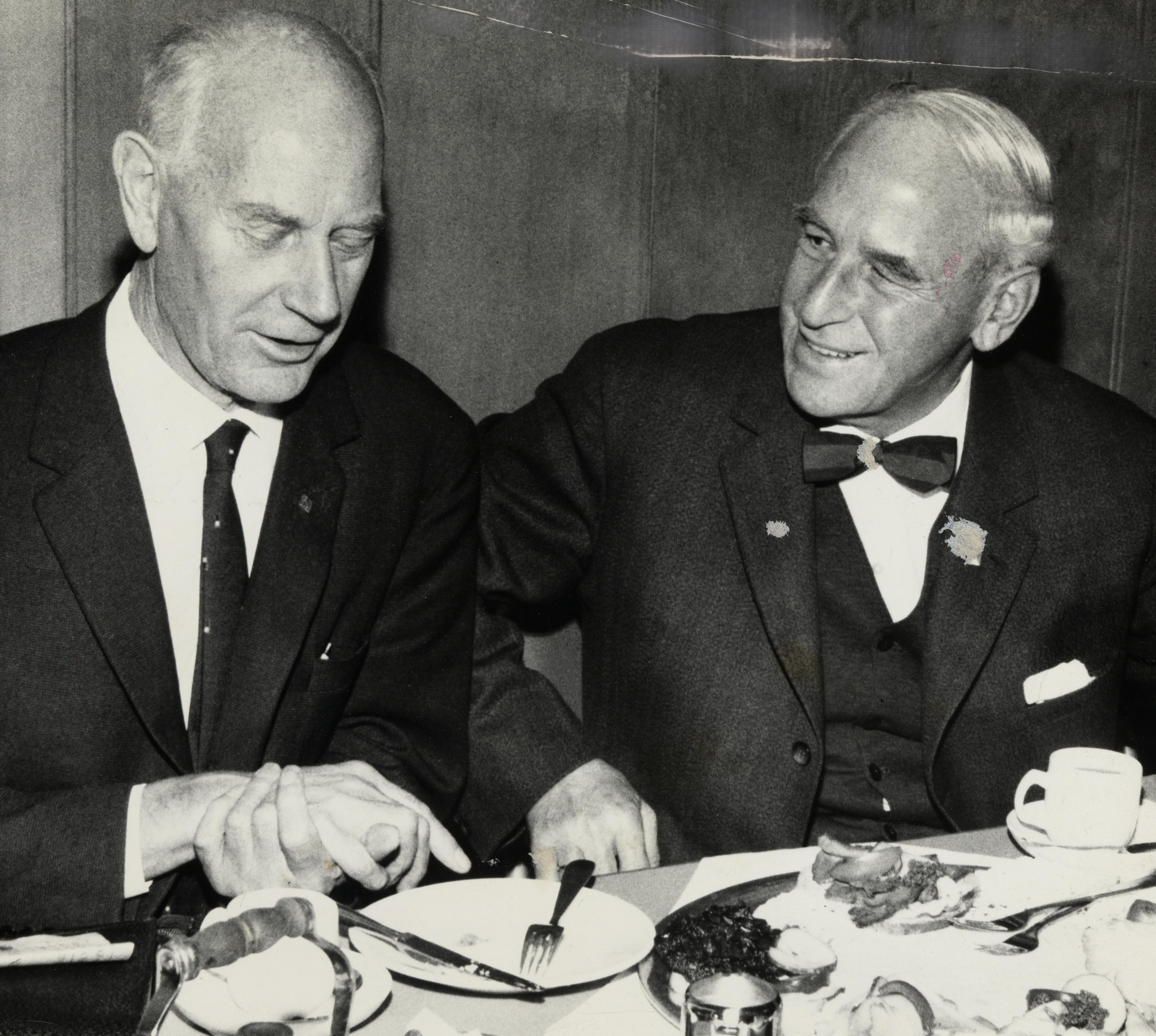
- Aasen (right) with Norwegian prime minister Einar Gerhardsen
- Born: 18 June 1901; Steinkjer, Norway
- Died: 1 November 1978 (aged 77); Oslo, Norway
- Occupations: Norwegian politician, journalist and poet

Arne Paasche Aasen (18 June 1901 – 1 November 1978) was a Norwegian politician, journalist and poet, who worked for the labour movement.

He was born in Steinkjer as a son of teacher and politician Augusta Aasen, née Paasche (1878–1920) and typographer Edolf Aasen (1877–1969). The family soon moved to Kristiania. In 1927 he married Valborg "Vaps" Moe (1901–1994). His sister was married to Paul Gauguin for some years.

He joined the Norwegian Labour Party at an early age. His mother was a central figure here before her early death. Aasen was also a member of the Left Communist Youth League and was present at the congress of 24 April 1927 when the Left Communist Youth League was merged with the Socialist Youth League to found the Workers' Youth League.

His poetic debut came in 1921 with the collection Sigd og hammer ("Sickle and Hammer"), where he hailed the revolution and Vladimir Lenin. Later highlights among his poetry collections were Høstens have (1923), Plog og penn (1930), Verden vårt hjem (1931), Nakne livet (1935), Blomster og brød (1937) and Bak hvert vindu (1950). Many of his poems became songs, when given melodies by Jolly Kramer-Johansen. Well-known working class anthems include "Frihetens forpost", "Seiren følger våre faner", "Sleggene synger (Samholdsangen)", and "Vi bygger landet". More popular songs include "De nære ting" and "Blåveispiken". "Blåveispiken" was recorded by Kurt Foss and Reidar Bøe in 1950, and became a great success, selling 100,000 records.

He worked as a journalist for a short time, in Fremtiden from 1924 to 1925 and also in Arbeidernes Pressekontor. He edited the Christmas magazine Arbeidets Jul. He also wrote humorous petites in Arbeiderbladet under the pseudonym Dorian Red.

He died in November 1978 in Oslo.
