= Anatoly Serov =

Soviet aviator (1910–1939)

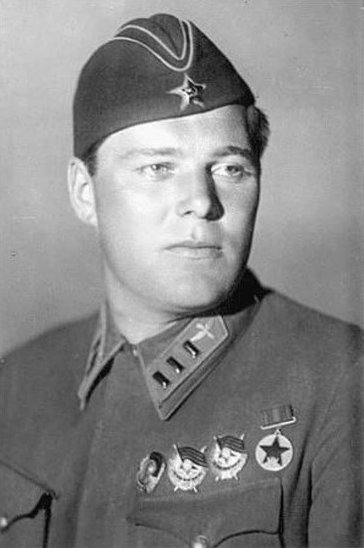
- Native name: Анатолий Константинович Серов
- Born: 2 April [O.S. 20 March] 1910; Vorontsovka village, Perm Governorate, Russian Empire
- Died: 11 May 1939 (aged 29) Vysokoe village, Rybnovsky District, Ryazan Oblast, Russian SFSR, USSR
- Buried: Kremlin Wall Necropolis
- Allegiance: Soviet Union
- Branch: Soviet Air Force
- Service years: 1929–1939
- Rank: Kombrig
- Conflicts: Spanish Civil War
- Awards: Hero of the Soviet Union
- Spouse: Valentina Polovikova

Anatoly Konstantinovich Serov (Russian: Анатолий Константинович Серов; 2 April [O.S. 20 March] 1910 – 11 May 1939) was a Soviet fighter pilot credited with becoming a flying ace during the Spanish Civil War.

== Early life ==
Serov was born on 2 April [O.S. 20 March] 1910 in the mining town of Vysokoe. After moving to the city of Bogoslovsk in 1918 he went on to complete his fourth grade of school in 1923. He then went on to live in Turyinsky before moving to Nadezhdinsk, where he worked as a steelworker and graduated from factory apprenticeship school in 1929.

== Aviation career ==
Almost a year after entering the Red Army in July 1929, Serov graduated from the Volskaya Theoretical School of Pilots and Aviation Technicians in June 1930, going on to attend the Orenburg Military Aviation School of Pilots, which he graduated from in December 1931. He was then assigned to the 1st Fighter Squadron in city of Krasnogvardisk in the Leningrad Military District, and from August 1933 to October 1935 he served with the 20th Fighter Squadron in Khabarovsk. From then until May 1936 he trained at the Zhukovsky Air Force Academy, after which he worked for one year as a test pilot at the Air Force Research and Development Institute, where he flew modified versions of the I-15 and I-16 fighter aircraft.

=== Spanish Civil War ===
Soon after arriving in Spain in June 1937 as a flight commander in a fighter aviation group, Serov became among the first Soviet pilots to engage in aerial combat at night after a sortie with Mikhail Yakushin. He returned to the USSR in January 1938, by then having totaled 150 sorties and been credited with eight solo aerial victories, including one at night.

=== Postwar ===
Not long after being awarded the title Hero of the Soviet Union on 2 March 1938 for his actions in Spain, he became head of the main flight inspectorate, and in April 1939 he graduated from advanced training for commanders at the Military Academy of General Staff.

=== Last flight ===
Serov was killed during a training flight with Polina Osipenko in a UTI-4 on 11 May 1939; during aerobatics the plane went into a tailspin and crashed despite almost recovering from the loss of control. The exact cause of the tailspin remains unknown, but the pilots were supposed to perform the maneuver that led to it at an altitude of 1000 meters, not the much lower 500 meter altitude they were at during the flight, which was supposed to give them more room for recovering in the event of such incident. He was buried at the Kremlin Wall Necropolis.

== Awards ==
- Hero of the Soviet Union (2 March 1938)
- Order of Lenin (2 March 1938)
- Two Order of the Red Banner (31 July 1937 and 22 October 1937)
