= Andrey Khrulyov =

Soviet general and politician

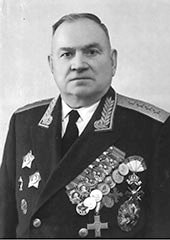
General armii Andrei Vasilyevich Khrulyov (1892–1962).

General Andrei Vasilyevich Khrulyov (Russian: Андрей Васильевич Хрулёв) (September 30 [O.S. September 18] 1892, village of Bolshaya Alexandrovka, Saint Petersburg Governorate – June 9, 1962, Moscow) was a Soviet military commander.

== Early life ==
Andrey Khrulyov was born in the village of Bolshaya Aleksandrovka, the son of Vasily Vasilyevich Khrulev, a blacksmith's striker, and Maria Ivanovna, a peasant. He apprenticed to a goldsmith (1903–1912). At some point, he became a revolutionary, for which he was exiled to Estonia (1912–1914).

== Career ==
Joining the Red Army in 1918 during the Russian Civil War, Khrulyov first served first in Petrograd, and during 1919–1921 as a political commissar in the 11th cavalry division of Budyonny's First Cavalry Army.

After the war, he remained in military service, and began developing a more sophisticated logistical system for the Red Army, which became the Rear of the Soviet Armed Forces. Khrulev was Head of Main Intendant Directorate of the Red Army (1939–1941), deputy chief of People's Commissar of Defence of the USSR and Head of Main Directorate of the Rear Services of the Red Army (from 1941). From 1942 to 1943 he served as People's Commissariat for Railways.

He was promoted to army general on 7 November 1943.

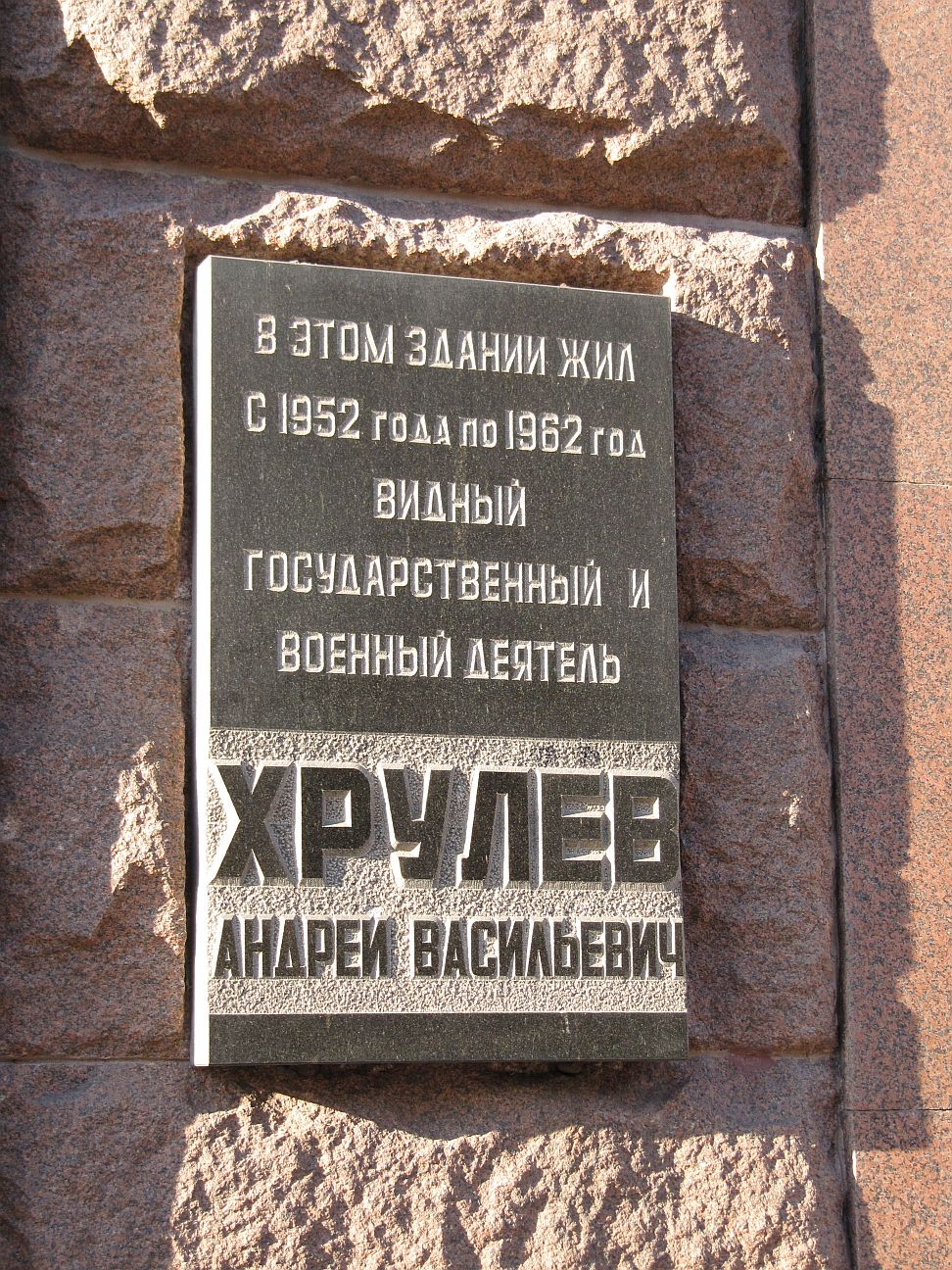
A plaque in honor of General Andrey Khrulyov on Tverskaya Street in Moscow.

At his death in 1962, a group of marshals pressed the Politburo to bury Khrulyov in the Kremlin Wall Necropolis. Normally, generals of his rank (Army General) were not entitled to this honor; Nikita Khrushchev was known to dislike Khrulyov and suggested burying him at the Novodevichy Cemetery. The military prevailed, and Khrulyov's ashes were buried on Red Square.

== Legacy ==
- The Military Logistics Academy is named after him In the academy museum there is a hall of Khrulev, where his personal belongings are kept.
- The Military Financial and Economic Institute in Yaroslavl bore the name of Army General A.V. Khrulev from 1964 to 1999 and from 2003 to 2007.
- Medal "Army General Khrulev" was established by order of the Minister of Defense on July 10, 2004.
- The A.V. Khrulev Prize was established by the Academy of Military Sciences and is awarded annually for achievements in the field of scientific, theoretical and practical activities in the logistics of the Armed Forces.
