= Kurt Foss =

- Born: 1 January 1925; Bergen, Hordaland, Norway
- Died: 17 October 1991 (aged 66)
- Occupations: Composer; singer

Kurt Foss (1 January 1925 – 17 October 1991) was a Norwegian composer, singer and vaudeville artist.

== Biography ==
He was born in Bergen, and together with Reidar Bøe Kurt Foss created the hugely popular duo "Radiofantomene" ("The Radio Phantoms") that was active throughout the 1940s, 50s and 60s. Their biggest success was the song "Blåveispiken" ("The Liverwort Girl") with lyrics by Arne Paasche Aasen and which was released in 1950 selling 100,000 records. They later produced humorous songs and tender vises, among these were "Tre yndige små mus" ("Three Cute Little Mice") in 1950, composed by Kristian Hauger, "Nordlandsnetter" ("Nordland Nights") in collaboration with Jens Book-Jenssen in 1952, "Det ringer, det ringer" ("It's Ringing, It's Ringing") in 1953, "Kallen og katten" ("The Old Man and the Cat") in 1954, which was one of several adaptations into songs of the poetry of Jakob Sande, and also "De nære ting" ("The Things Near") in 1951, that song was also with lyrics by Arne Paasche Aasen. After the death of Reidar Bøe in 1969, Foss didn't thrive in the limelight as he had used to. During the subsequent years he worked as, among other things, stage manager at some of Oslo's theatres. Nevertheless, he still performed some during the 1970s as well as the 1980s, initially together with his wife Torhild Lindal who was also a stage artist, and later with other, one of these being Jon Eikemo. He was awarded the Gammleng Award in the veteran category in 1986. In 1989 he moved back to his home town, Bergen, and he lived there until his death in 1991, at the age of 66.

The first CD release of "Radiofantomene" came in 2004, and the second collector's album was released in August 2005. A third record with musical adaptations of Jakob Sande poems came in November 2006.
