= Yulian Rukavishnikov =

Russian sculptor (1922–2000)

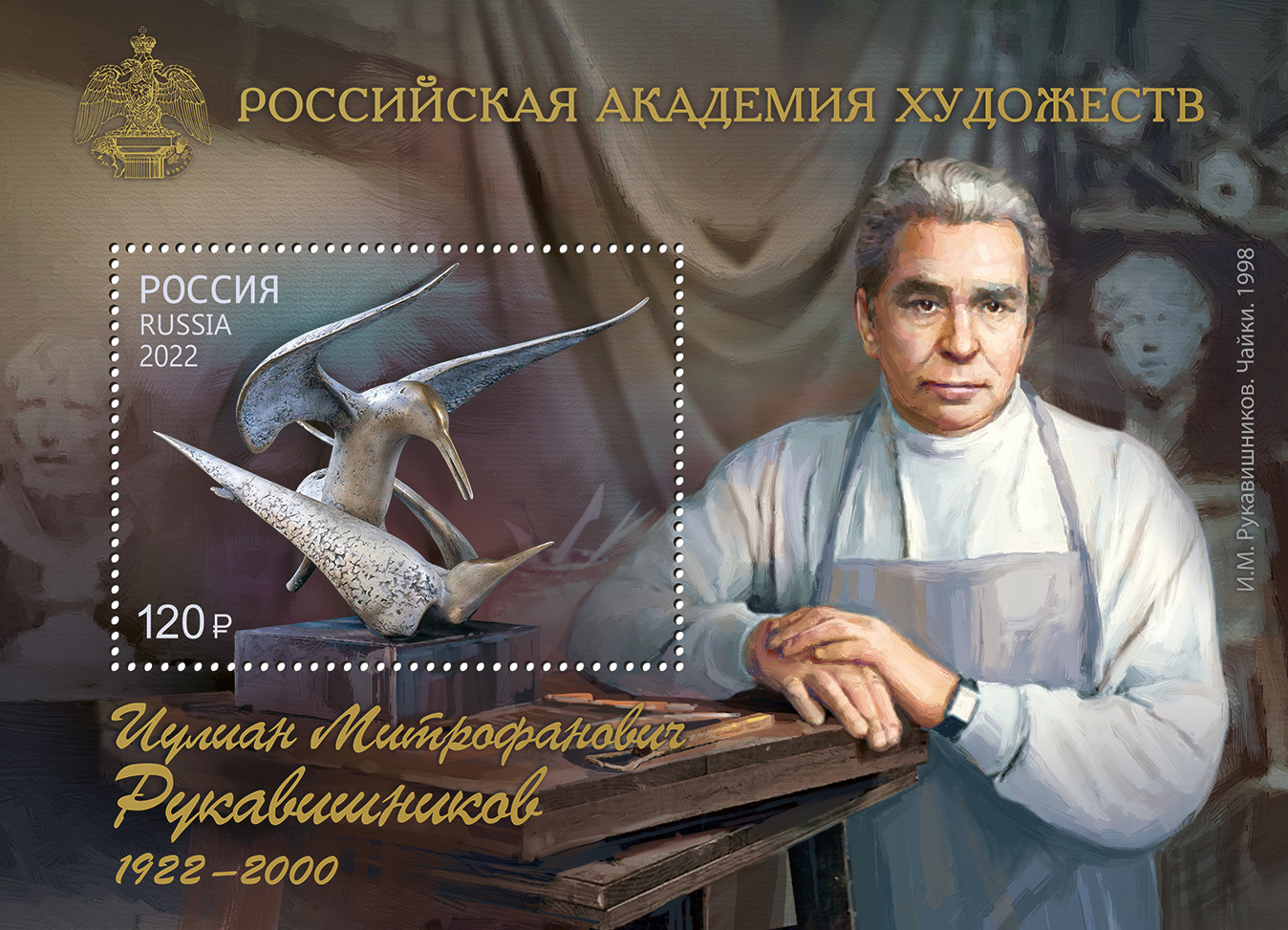
Rukavishnikov and his 1998 work Seagulls on a 2022 stamp sheet of Russia

Yulian Mitrofanovich Rukavishnikov (Russian: Иулиан Митрофанович Рукавишников; 29 September 1922, Moscow – 14 December 2000, Moscow) was a Russian sculptor, and a full member of the Russian Academy of Arts. He enjoyed a long and successful career spanning about 50 years with works ranging from medals to large monuments and high reliefs, yet he was mostly known for his sculptures of Vladimir Lenin, which were installed both within and outside of the Soviet Union.

Rukavishnikov's father Mitrofan, wife Angelina, son Aleksandr, and grandson Filipp, were also prominent Russian sculptors.

== Biography ==
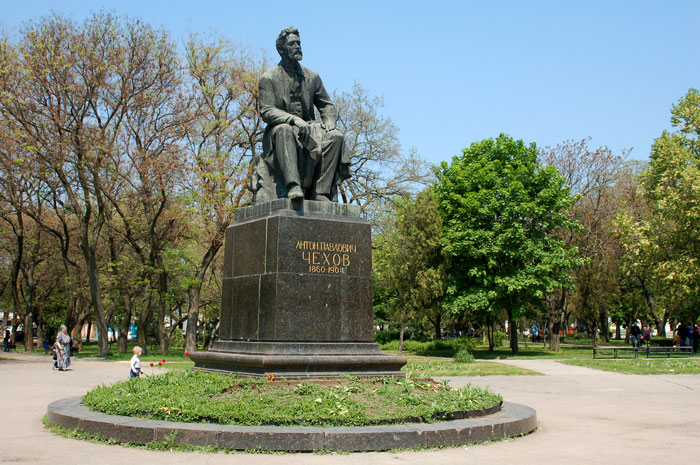
Chekhov Monument in Taganrog by Rukavishnikov

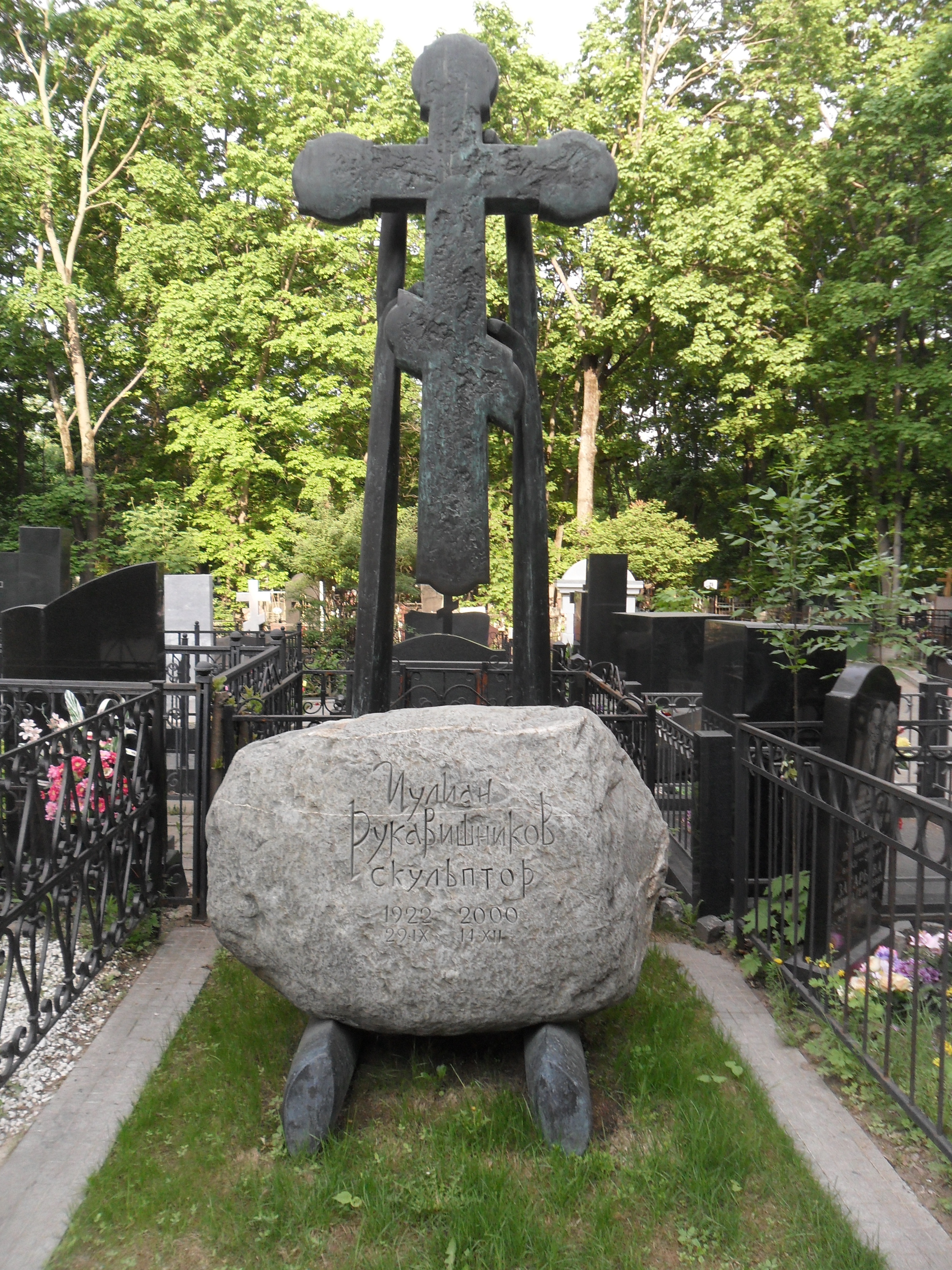
Rukavishnikov's grave at the Vagankovo Cemetery in Moscow

Rukavishnikov was related to the writer Vladimir Nabokov through Nabokov's mother, Yelena Rukavishnikova. He trained in a flight school together with Vasily Stalin, the son of Joseph Stalin. It was Vasily, who recommended Rukavishnikov to Stalin for creating a bust of Stalin's mother at the Mtatsminda Pantheon in Tbilisi, Georgia. Rukavishnikov was then just an art school student, yet Stalin came to like his work.

Rukavishnikov's father Mitrofan, wife Angelina, son Aleksandr, and grandson Filip, were also prominent Russian sculptors.

During one of his first individual flights at the aviation school, Rukavishnikov's plane stalled at a height of ca. 30 meters, and hard-crashed to the ground. Rukavishnikov sustained a heavy injury to his head; he consequently resigned from the flight school and pursued a sculptor career.

== Work ==
Rukavishnikov used various materials, including bronze, marble and clay, without preference to any of them. His works ranged from medals to high reliefs and upscale monuments. He was mostly known to outsiders for his depictions of prominent personalities, yet his private, studio work focused on nature and small animals. Approximately 12 of his sculptures are featured in the Tretyakov Gallery in Moscow. His other major works include the following:

- Bust of Keke Geladze at the Mtatsminda Pantheon in Tbilisi, Georgia
- Chekhov Monument, Taganrog
- Busts of Leonid Brezhnev and Mikhail Suslov at the Kremlin Wall Necropolis
- The Resurrection of Christ at the Cathedral of Christ the Saviour in Moscow
