= Blåveispiken =

Song by Kurt Foss and Reidar Bøe
- Released: 1950
- Songwriter(s): Arne Paasche Aasen
- Composer(s): Kurt Foss, Reidar Bøe

"Blåveispiken" is a Norwegian song with lyrics by Arne Paasche Aasen, and melody by Kurt Foss and Reidar Bøe. Foss and Bøe recorded the song in 1950. The record was a great success, and sold 100,000 items. The song was a popular hit in Norwegian radio in the 1950s.

The lyrics centers on the narrator on one of his regular walks when he stayed with his friends at Tyrihauen, Røyse. He wrote the song to the daughter, Mette-Lise (Misse) Lamer Who was five years old. She offers him a bunch of liverwort flowers which she just has gathered.
