= Kremlin Wall Necropolis =

Burial site in central Moscow

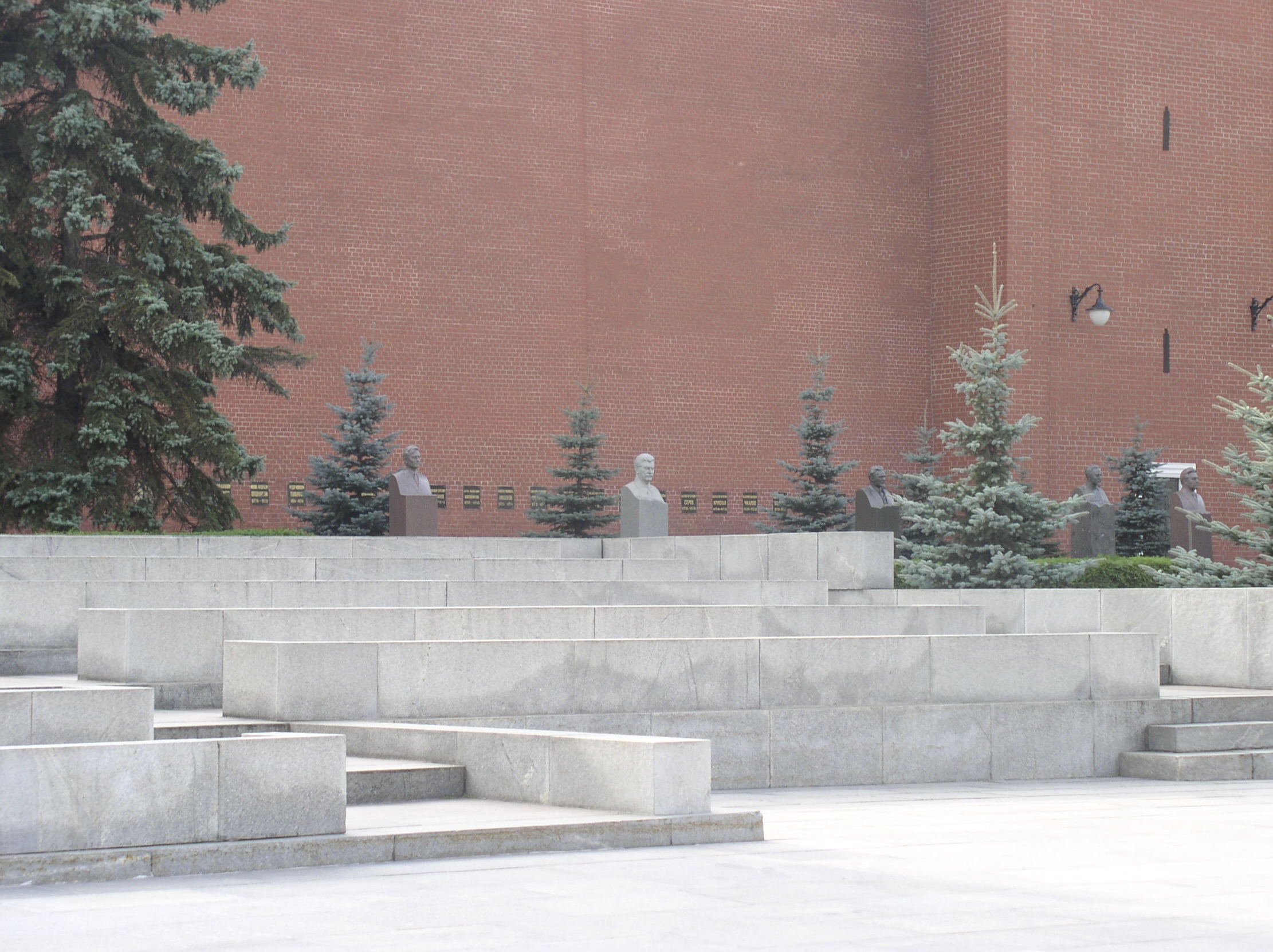
- The tombs of Suslov, Stalin, Kalinin, Dzerzhinsky, and Brezhnev in front of the Moscow Kremlin Wall. The tomb of Yuri Andropov, which stands between Kalinin's and Dzerzhinsky's, is obstructed by trees. The mausoleum is immediately to the right.
- Interactive map of Kremlin Wall Necropolis

Details
- Established: 1917
- Closed: 1986
- Location: Red Square, Moscow
- Country: Soviet Union
- Coordinates: 55°45′13″N 37°37′11″E

The Kremlin Wall Necropolis is the former national cemetery of the Soviet Union, located in Red Square in Moscow beside the Kremlin Wall. Burials there began in November 1917, when 240 pro-Bolsheviks who died during the Moscow Bolshevik Uprising were buried in mass graves. This improvised burial site gradually transformed into the centerpiece of military and civilian honor during the Second World War.

Centered on Lenin's Mausoleum, the Necropolis was initially built from wood in 1924 and rebuilt in granite in 1929–30. After the last mass burial in Red Square in 1921, funerals there were usually conducted as state ceremonies reserved as the final honor for highly venerated politicians, military leaders, cosmonauts, and scientists. Sometime between 1925 and 1927, burials in the ground stopped, replaced by the interment of cremains in the Kremlin wall itself. Burials in the ground resumed with Mikhail Kalinin's funeral in 1946.

The Kremlin Wall is the de facto resting place of the Soviet Union's deceased national icons. Burial there was a status symbol among Soviet citizens, and even since the dissolution of the Soviet Union, citizens of the Russian Federation and many other former post-Soviet states continue to pay their respects to Soviet national heroes at the Kremlin Wall.

The Kremlin Wall Necropolis was designated a protected landmark in 1974, and the practice of burying dignitaries at Red Square ended with the funeral of General Secretary Konstantin Chernenko in March 1985.

== Site ==
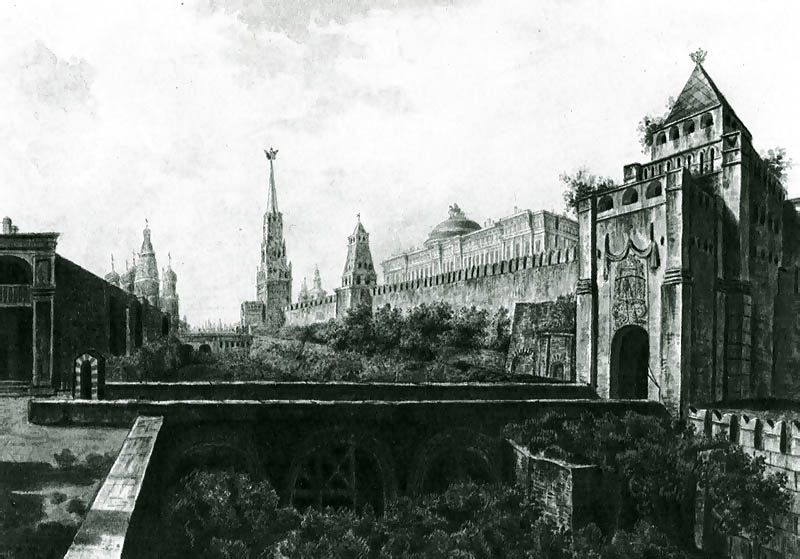
As recently as 1800, the site of the Necropolis was a boggy moat spanned with stone bridges.

The eastern segment of the Kremlin Wall, and Red Square behind it, emerged on its present site in the 15th century, during the reign of Ivan III; the wall and the square were separated with a wide defensive moat filled with water diverted from the Neglinnaya River. The moat was lined with a secondary fortress wall, and spanned by three bridges connecting the Kremlin to the posad.

In 1707–08, Peter the Great, expecting a Swedish incursion deep into the Russian mainland, restored the moat around the Kremlin, cleared Red Square and built earthen fortifications around Nikolskaya and Spasskaya towers. From 1776 to 1787, Matvey Kazakov built the Kremlin Senate that today provides a backdrop for the present-day Necropolis.

In the 18th century the unused, neglected fortifications deteriorated and were not properly repaired until the 1801 coronation of Alexander I. In one season the moat with bridges and adjacent buildings was replaced with a clean span of paved square. (Note: Brooke (p. 35) incorrectly dates the demolition after 1812.) More reconstruction followed in the 19th century.

In 1812, the stretch of Kremlin Wall south from Senate Tower was badly damaged by the explosion at the Kremlin Arsenal set off by the retreating French troops. Nikolskaya Tower lost its gothic crown which was erected in 1807–1808. Arsenalnaya Tower developed deep cracks, leading to Joseph Bove proposing in 1813 the outright demolition of the towers to prevent the wall's imminent collapse.

Eventually, the main structures of the towers were deemed sound enough to be left in place, and were topped with new tented roofs designed by Bove. Peter's bastions were razed (creating space for nearby Alexander Garden and Theatre Square), The Kremlin Wall facing Red Square was rebuilt shallower than before, and acquired its present shape in the 1820s.

Timeline of burials in Red Square

== Burials from 1917 to 1927 ==
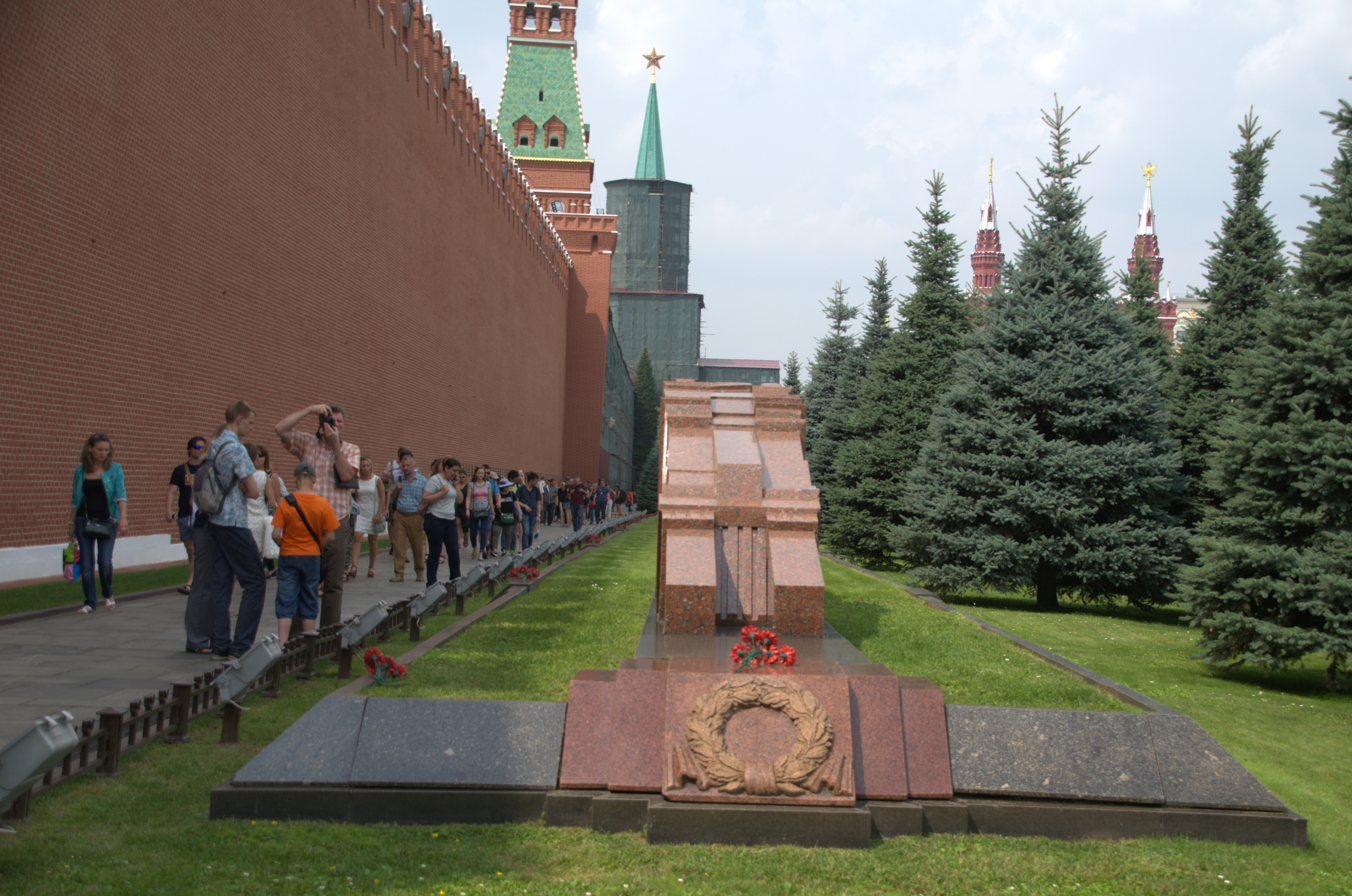
Red Square Mass Graves

Between the 1917 October Revolution and June 1927, the area outside the Kremlin Wall between the Senate and Nikolskaya towers was used for mass and individual burials of people who had to some extent contributed to the socialist revolution or the Bolshevik cause. This included ordinary soldiers killed in battle, victims of the Civil War, militia men fallen while fighting anti-Bolsheviks, noted Bolshevik politicians, and individuals associated with creating the new Soviet society. Burial plots of the 1917–1927 period are organized into 15 landscaped grave sites with the names of the buried inscribed on black marble tablets.

Table: List of burials (by grave) in Red Square ground, 1917–1927

Grave	Name
No. 1	A. I. Vantorin, P. G. Tiapkin, I. S. Erov, H. M. Snegirev, Vladimir Zagorsky (1919), A. Nikolaeva, I. M. Ignatova, M. Volkova, S. Arafoshin, S. Goriunov, I. Dudinsky, X. Zvonov.
No. 2	I. Zimin, I. Ivanov, S. Kokorev, A. Kosarev, N. N. Kropotov, A. N. Khaldina, G. V. Titov, Mark Mokryak (1919), P. Kospianik, V. Krashenilnikov, A. Leshikov, F. Lizenko.
No. 3	Anton Khorak (1918), F. Lysenkov, I. Petukhov, V. Romanov, G. N. Razorepov-Nikitin, Aleksandr Safonov (1919), X. Kolbin, A. L. Krash, M. Ryzhev, A. Smirnov, F. Sologudinov, X. Sopliakov.
No. 4	S. Fedorov, S. Khokhlov, S. Tsipliakov, V. Shefarevich, Vadim Podbelsky (1920), Alexander Kuchutenkov (1918), I. M. Valdovsky, Yegor Shvyrkov, Nikolay Pryamikov, F. Drozdov, D. Esulov, G. V. Tomsky.
No. 5	A. A. Sukharev, G. L. Elagin, I. G. Stepachev, Inessa Armand (1920), John Reed (1920), Ivan Rusakov (1921), Semyon Pekalov (1918), X. Stefanovich, K. Volsky, X. Taraev.
No. 6	Victor Nogin (1924), Lev Karpov (1921), Vitaly Kovshov (1920), Vasily Likhachev (1924), Van Chzhan.
No. 7	D. M. Vorovskaya, Vaclav Vorovsky (1922), Nariman Narimanov (1924), Pyotr Voykov (1927), Anton Stankevich (1919), P. A. Zasukhin, D. I. Iudichev, S. P. Kapelin, I. V. Kotov.
No. 8	P. P. Sherbakov, Pavel Andreev (1917), A. A. Kireev, M. Draudyn, Ivan Khomyakov (1920), Mikhail Yanyshev (1920), L. A. Lisinova, Ivan Smilga (1918), V. E. Morozov, S. A. Shiriaev, L. F. Mikhailov.
No. 9	A. P. Saporoshez, Yakov Bocharov (1920), A. T. Timofeev, Augusta Aasen (1920).
No. 10	G. Timofeev, A. A. Iniushev, I. Gavrikov, M. T. Usoltsev.
No. 11	T. A. Baskakov, S. V. Vladimirov, T. F. Nedelkin, N. R. Trunov, V. E. Voitovich.
No. 12	A. Sakharov, Fyodor Sergeyev (1921), E. N. Silunov, A. P. Voronov, I. A. Nazarov, G. A. Skvortsov.
No. 13	Ivan Zhilin (1922), Ivan Konstantinov (1921), Valerian Abakovsky (1921), Paul Freeman (1921).
No. 14	O. Vever, O. K. Virzemnek, I. E. Zweinek, Heinrich Zweinek (1919), Yefim Afonin (1922), Otto Strupat (1921), Oskar Hellbrück (1921), John William Hewlett (1921), Alexander Kvardakov (1918), X. Stepanov.
No. 15	Alexander Gadomsky (1918), Felix Barasevich (1918).

=== Mass graves of 1917 ===
10 November 1917. A mass grave on Red Square for people who died in the October Revolution

In July 1917, hundreds of soldiers of the Russian Northern Front were arrested for mutiny and desertion and locked up in Daugavpils (then Dvinsk) fortress. Later, 869 Dvinsk inmates were transported to Moscow. Here, the jailed soldiers launched a hunger strike. Public support for them threatened to develop into a citywide riot. On 22 September, 593 inmates were released. The rest were left behind bars until the October Revolution.

The released soldiers, collectively called Dvintsy, stayed in the city as a cohesive unit, based in Zamoskvorechye District and openly hostile to the ruling Provisional Government. Immediately after the October Revolution in Saint Petersburg, Dvintsy became the strike force of the Bolsheviks in Moscow. Late at night on 27–28 October, a detachment of approximately two hundred men marching north to Tverskaya Street, confronted the loyalist forces near the State Historical Museum on Red Square. During the fighting, 70 of the Dvintsy, including their company commander, Sapunov, were killed at the barricades.

The following day, loyalists led by Colonel Konstantin Ryabtsev succeeded in taking over the Kremlin. They gunned down the surrendered Red soldiers at the Kremlin Arsenal wall. More Red soldiers were killed as the Bolsheviks stormed the Kremlin, taking control on the night of 2–3 November. Street fighting tapered off after claiming nearly a thousand lives. On 4 November the new Bolshevik administration decreed their dead would be buried at Red Square next to the Kremlin Wall, where most of them were killed.

Voices reached us across the immense place, and the sound of picks and shovels. We crossed over. Mountains of dirt and rock were piled high near the base of the wall. Climbing these we looked down into two massive pits, ten or fifteen feet deep and fifty yards long, where hundreds of soldiers and workers were digging in the light of huge fires. A young student spoke to us in German. "The Brotherhood Grave", he explained.
– John Reed, Ten Days that Shook the World.

A total of 238 dead were buried in the mass graves between Senate and Nikolskaya towers in a public funeral on November 10. John Reed incorrectly mentions 500. Two more victims were buried on the 14 and 17 of November. The youngest, Pavel Andreyev, was 14 years old. Of 240 pro-revolution martyrs of the October–November fighting, only 20, including 12 of the Dvintsy, are identified in the official listing of the Moscow Heritage Commission. As of March 2009, three Moscow streets are still named after these individual victims, (Note: Lysinovskaya, Pavla Andreeva, Verzemneka Streets) with Dvintsev Street named after the Dvintsy force.

The loyalists secured a permit to publicly bury their dead on 13 November. This funeral started at the old Moscow State University building near Kremlin. Thirty-seven dead were interred at the Vsekhsvyatskoye Cemetery, now demolished, in the then-suburban Sokol District.

=== Burials of 1918–1927 ===
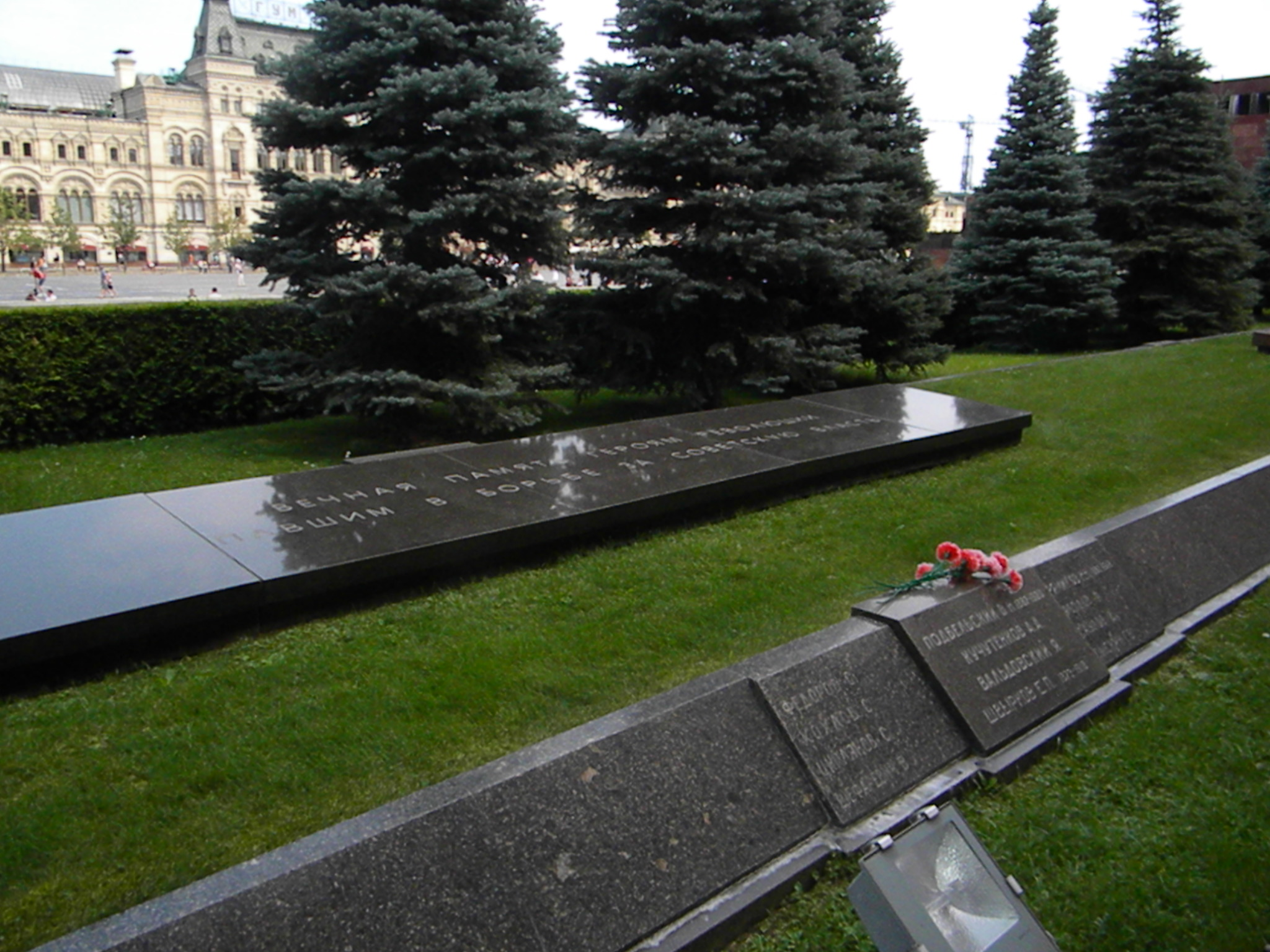
Red Square Mass Grave No. 4

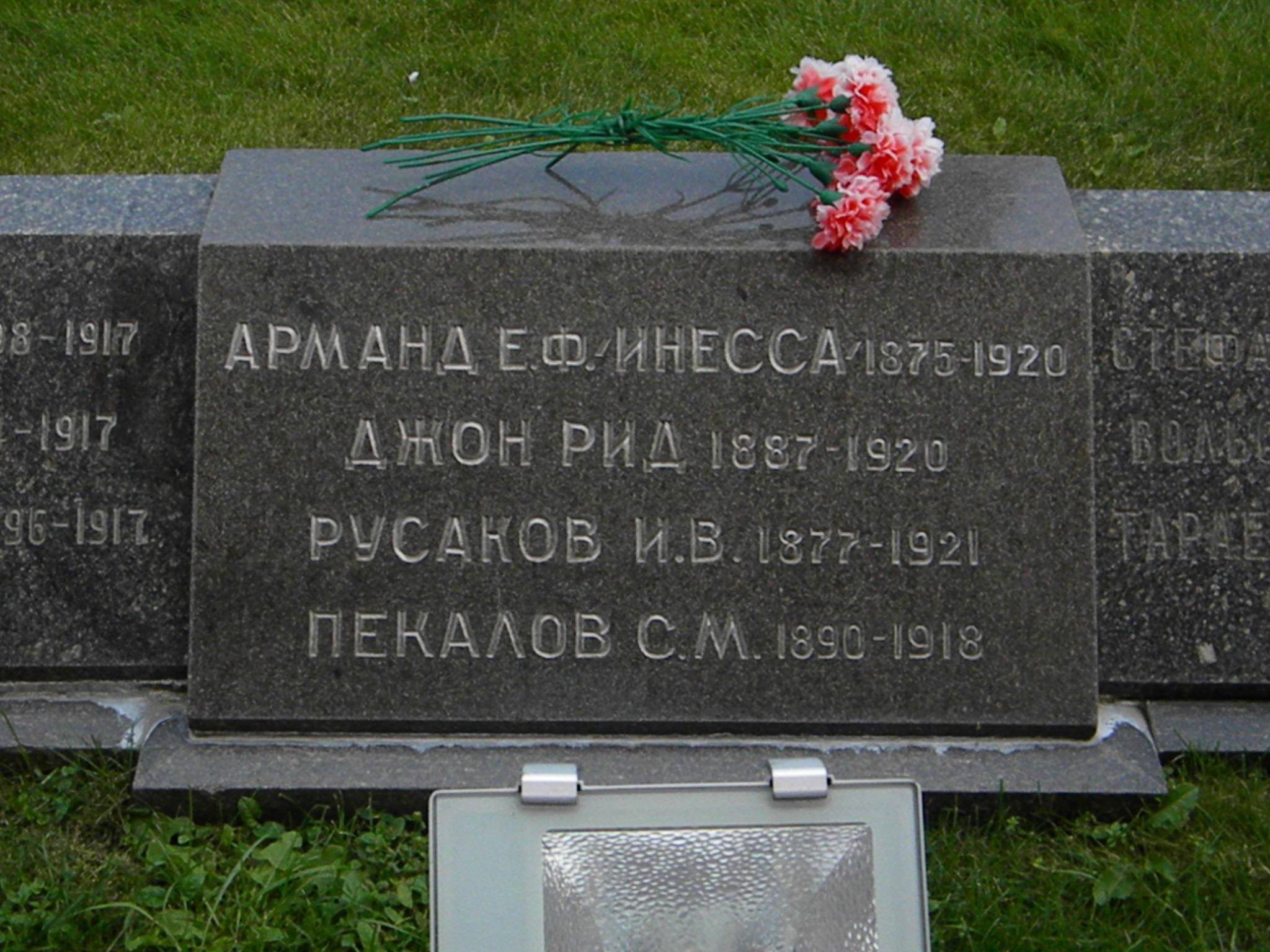
Red Square Mass Grave No. 5, inscriptions for Inessa Armand, John Reed, Ivan Rusakov and Semyon Pekalov

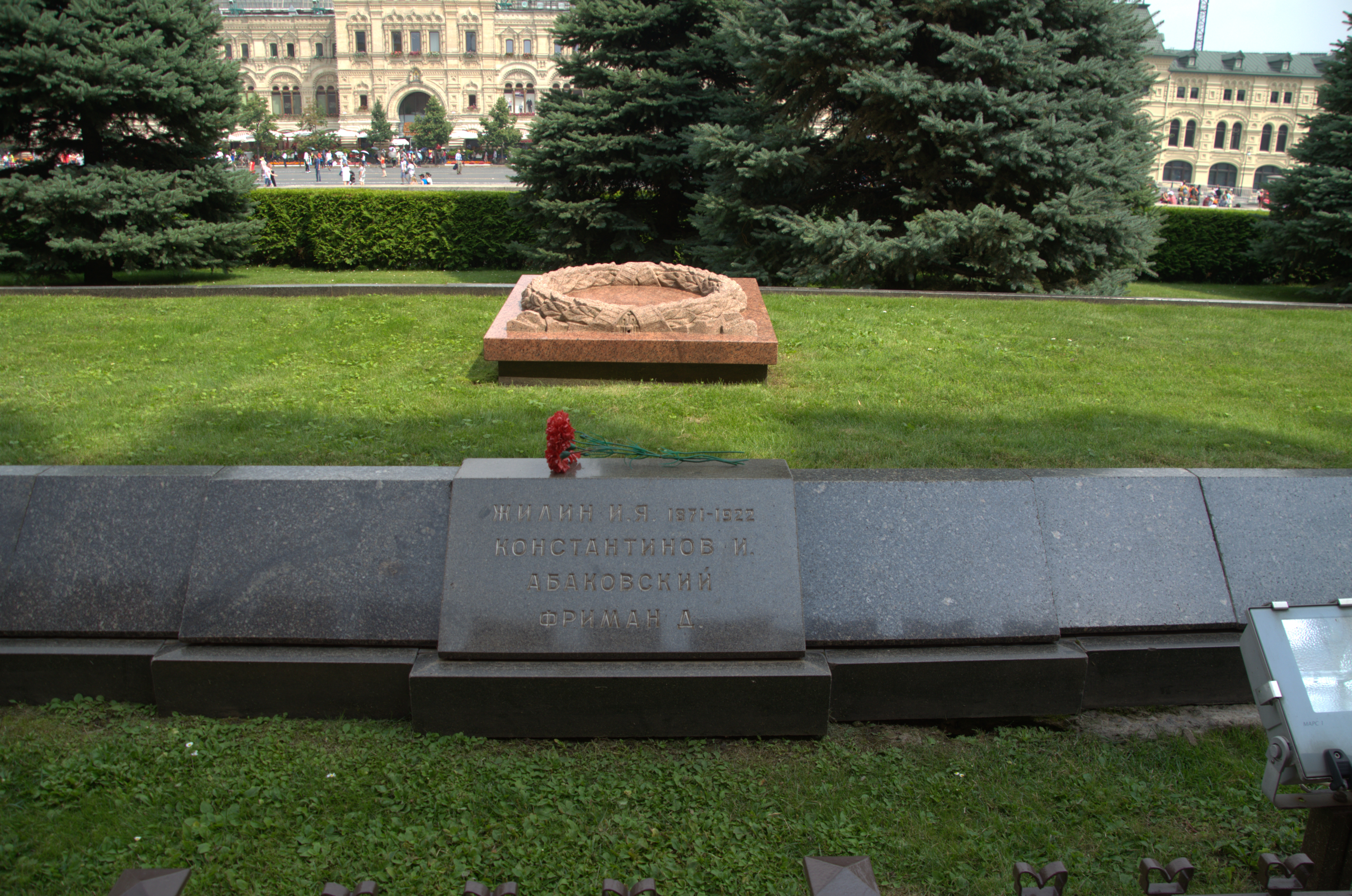
Red Square Mass Grave No. 13, inscriptions for Ivan Zhilin, Ivan Konstantinov, Valerian Abakovsky and Paul Freeman

Mass and individual burials in the ground under the Kremlin Wall continued until the funeral of Pyotr Voykov in June 1927. In the first years of the Soviet regime, the honor of being buried on Red Square was extended to ordinary soldiers, Civil War victims, and Moscow militia men killed in clashes with anti-Bolsheviks (March–April 1918). In January 1918, the Red Guards buried the victims of a terrorist bombing in Dorogomilovo. In the same January White Guards fired on a pro-Bolshevik street rally. The eight victims were buried under the Kremlin Wall.

The largest single burial occurred in 1919. On 25 September, anarchists led by former socialist revolutionary Donat Cherepanov set off an explosion in a Communist Party school building in Leontyevsky Lane when Moscow party chief Vladimir Zagorsky was speaking to students. Twelve people, including Zagorsky, were killed and buried in a mass grave on Red Square.

Another unusual incident was the 24 July 1921 crash of the Aerowagon, an experimental and not fully tested high-speed railcar fitted with an aircraft engine and propeller traction. On the day of the crash, it delivered a group of Soviet and foreign communists led by Fyodor Sergeyev to the Tula collieries. On the return trip to Moscow, the aerowagon derailed at high speed, killing 7 of the 22 people on board, including its inventor Valerian Abakovsky. This was the last mass burial in the ground of Red Square.

Yakov Sverdlov, who died in 1919, allegedly from the Spanish flu, was buried in an individual grave near the Senate Tower. This area later included eleven more individual graves of top-ranking Soviet leaders (see Individual tombs section). Sverdlov was followed by John Reed, Inessa Armand, Viktor Nogin and other notable Bolsheviks and their foreign allies. Interment in the Kremlin Wall, apart from its location next to the seat of government, was also seen as a statement of atheism. Burial in the ground at a traditional cemetery next to a church was deemed inappropriate for a Bolshevik.

For the same reason, cremation, then prohibited by the Russian Orthodox Church, was preferred to burial in a coffin and favored by Lenin and Trotsky – though Lenin expressed the wish to be buried next to his mother in St. Petersburg. The new government had sponsored the construction of crematoria since 1919. In 1925, the first burial of cremated remains in a niche in the wall took place.

Table: List of burials (by name) in Red Square ground, 1918–1927

Year of burial	Name
1918	Civil war casualties: Ivan Smilga, Anton Khorak, Alexander Kvardakov, Alexander Kuchutenkov, Felix Barasevich, Alexander Gadomsky; Militiamen killed in street fights with Zamoskvorechye gangs: Semyon Pekalov, Yegor Shvyrkov, Nikolay Pryamikov
1919	Yakov Sverdlov; Civil war casualties: Anton Stankevich, Mark Mokryak, Heinrich Zweinek; twelve victims of Leontyevsky Lane bombing including Vladimir Zagorsky
1920	Inessa Armand, Yakov Bocharov, Vitaly Kovshov, Ivan Khomyakov, Augusta Aasen, John Reed, Mikhail Yanyshev, Vadim Podbelsky
1921	Ivan Rusakov, Lev Karpov, the seven Aerowagon crash victims (Valerian Abakovsky, Paul Freeman, Oskar Hellbrück, John William Hewlett, Ivan Konstantinov, Fyodor Sergeyev, Otto Strupat)
1922	Yefim Afonin, Ivan Zhilin
1923	Vatslav Vorovsky
1924	Vasily Likhachev, Victor Nogin
1925	Mikhail Frunze, Nariman Narimanov
1926	Felix Dzerzhinsky
1927	Pyotr Voykov

== Mausoleum, 1924–1961 ==
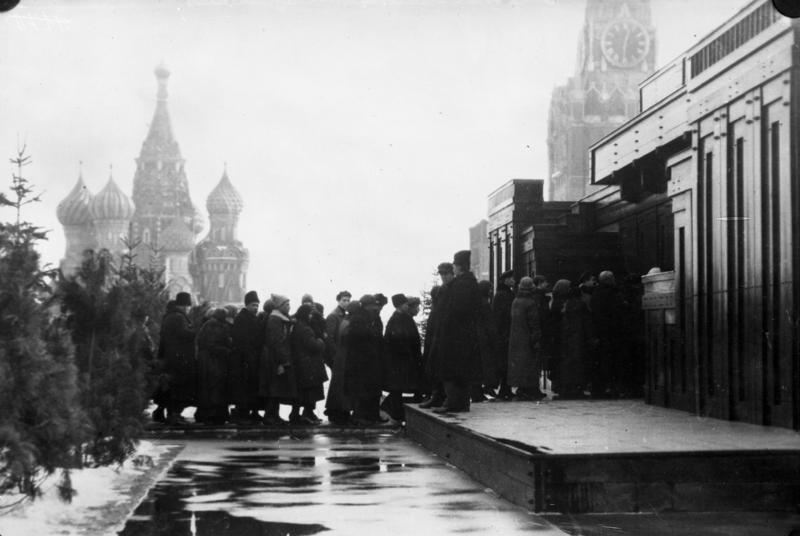
The first wooden Mausoleum in 1925

Vladimir Lenin died of a stroke on 21 January 1924. While his body lay in state in the Pillar Hall of the House of the Unions, the Politburo discussed ways to preserve it, initially for forty days, despite objections from his widow and siblings. Joseph Stalin gave instructions to install a vault for Lenin's embalmed remains inside the Kremlin Wall. On 27 January, Lenin's casket was deposited in a temporary wooden vault, built in a single day.

The first proper Mausoleum was built of wood in March–July 1924 and officially opened on August 1. Foreign visitors were allowed inside on August 3. In April 1926, a contest to design and build a new permanent Mausoleum was announced. In July 1929, construction of Alexey Shchusev's winning design began and was completed in sixteen months. The Mausoleum has since functioned as a government reviewing stand during public parades.

The glass sarcophagus of Lenin's tomb was twice vandalized by visitors, in 1959 and 1969, leading to installation of a bulletproof glass shell. It was bombed twice, in 1963, when the terrorist was the sole victim, and in 1973, when an explosion killed the terrorist and two bystanders.

The Russian Orthodox Church Outside of Russia has petitioned Russia to dismantle the cult of personality and bury Lenin's body, seeking to "rid Red Square of the remains of the main persecutor and executioner of the 20th century," although the Russian Orthodox Church demurs.

As of 2025, Lenin's body remains in the Mausoleum, excluding the period of evacuation to Tyumen during 1941–1945.

=== Stalin's body ===
Two days after Joseph Stalin's death, the Politburo decreed that his remains be placed on display in the Mausoleum. In November 1953, it officially reopened with Lenin and Stalin side by side. A March 1953 plan, never implemented, called for the construction of a Pantheon in which the bodies of Lenin and Stalin would be eventually relocated.

In 1961, following the de-Stalinization of the Khrushchev Thaw, removal of Stalin's body from the Mausoleum was unanimously sanctioned by the 22nd Congress of the Communist Party. On 31 October 1961, the Mausoleum was quickly covered with plywood. Red Square was closed as a matter of routine, in preparation for the 7 November parade. Stalin's remains were quickly re-interred in a deep grave, lined with concrete blocks, behind the Mausoleum. The ceremony was attended only by the state commission led by Nikolay Shvernik.

Harold Skilling, who visited the Mausoleum in November 1961, noted that "everyone was so curious to see the new grave of Stalin... Unlike others, his [grave] was not yet graced by a bust and was marked only by a tablet with the name I.V. Stalin and dates of birth and death". The existing tomb of Stalin carved by Nikolai Tomsky was installed in June 1970.

== Ashes, 1925–1984 ==
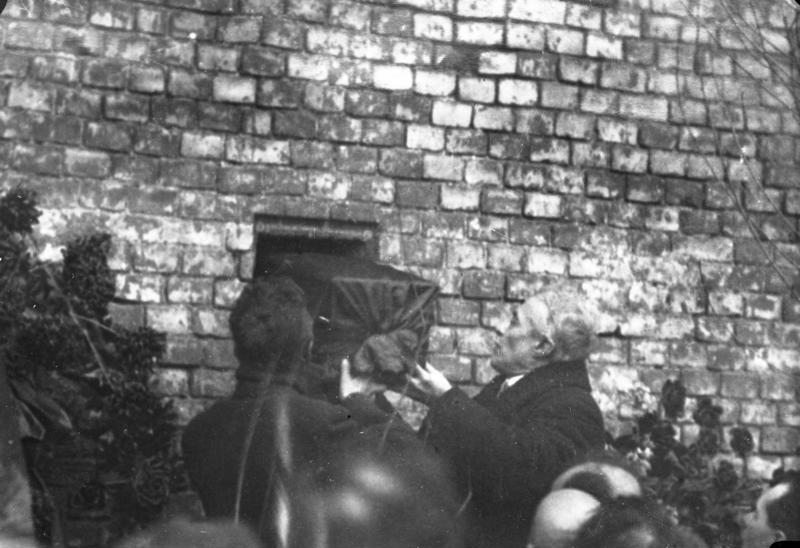
An early burial of cremated ash in the wall

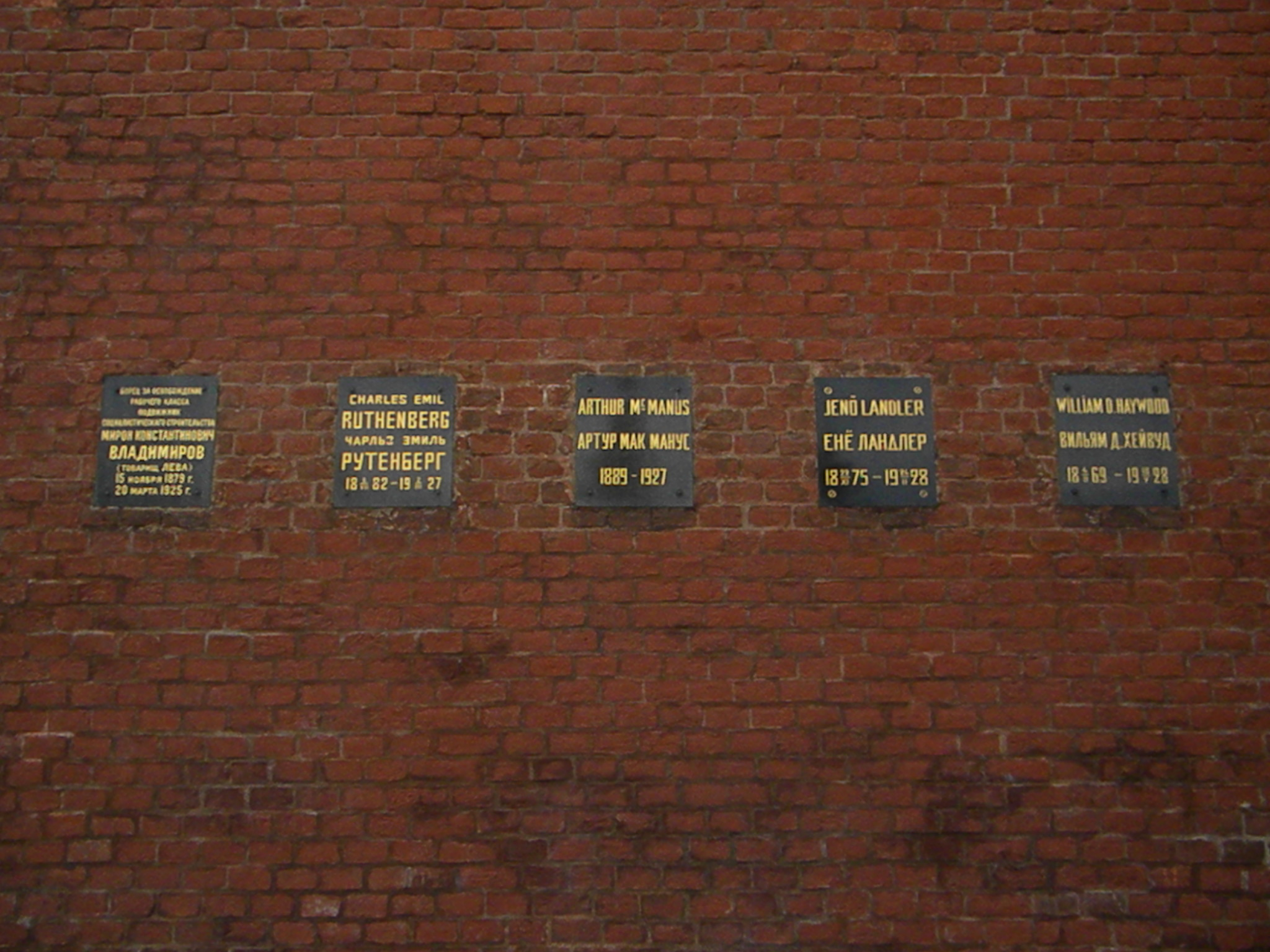
Section of the Kremlin Wall with urn burials (Vladimirov, Ruthenberg, MacManus, Landler, Haywood)

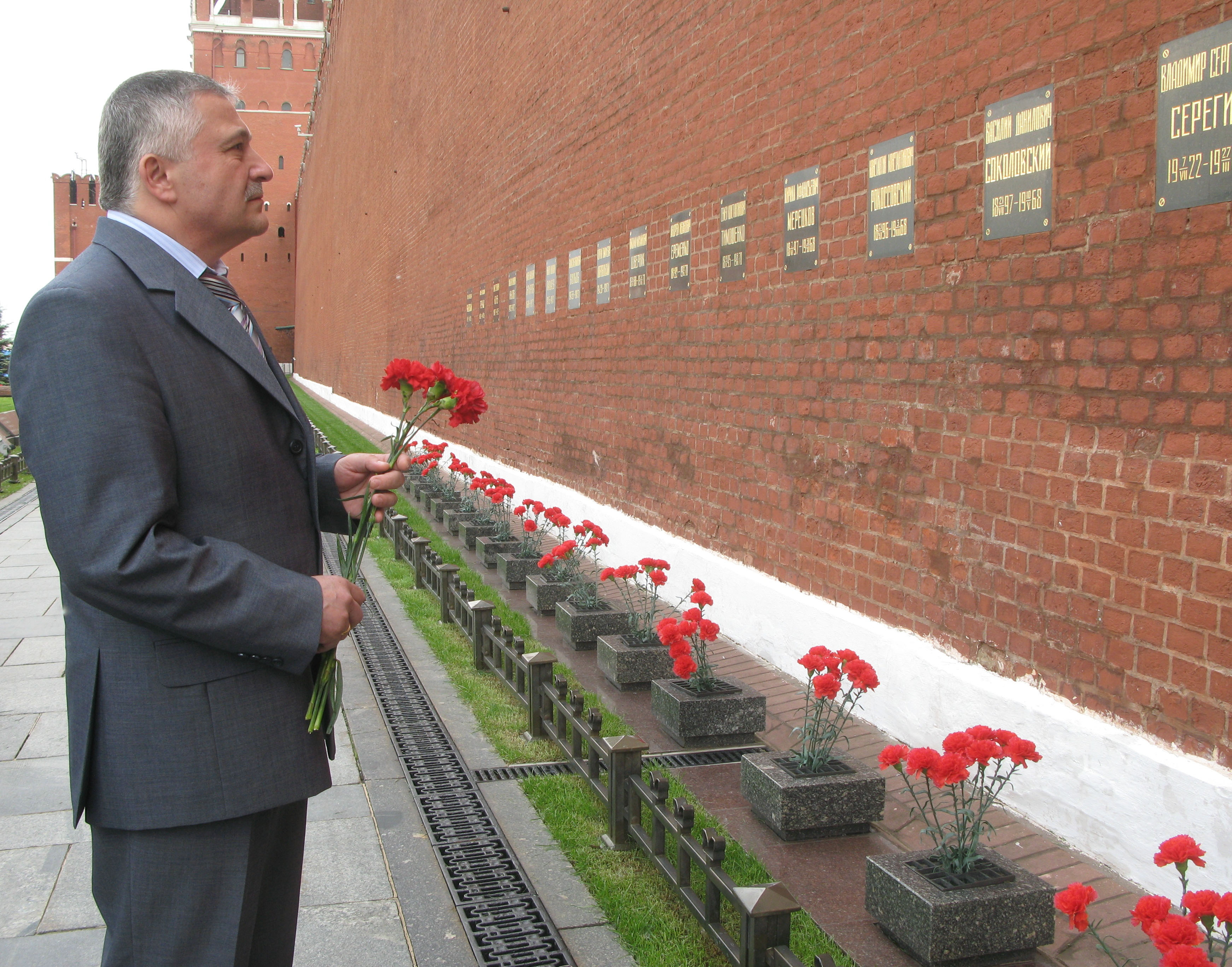
Fyodor Yurchikhin laying flowers at the Kremlin Wall Necropolis, 2010

The first person to be cremated and interred in an urn in the Kremlin Wall, 45-year-old former People's Commissar of Finance Miron Vladimirov, died in Italy in March 1925. The procedure for dealing with human remains in an urn was still unfamiliar at the time, and Vladimirov's urn was carried to his grave in an ordinary coffin.

Between 1925 and the opening of the Donskoye Cemetery crematorium in October 1927, interments in the wall and burials in the ground coexisted together. The wall was preferred for foreign dignitaries of the Comintern, such as Jenő Landler, Bill Haywood, (Note: Half of Haywood's ashes is buried in Moscow, another in Chicago – Brooke, p. 43) Arthur MacManus, Charles Ruthenberg. Ground burial was granted only to top Party executives, such as Mikhail Frunze, Felix Dzerzhinsky, Nariman Narimanov and Pyotr Voykov.

Initially, the bodies of the deceased were laid in state in the Kremlin's halls. With the tightening of security in the late 1920s, the official farewell station was relocated to the House of the Unions' "Pillar Hall" on Okhotny Ryad, where Lenin lay in state in 1924, and remained there until the end of the Soviet state. Burials initially took place to the north of the Senate Tower, switching to the south side in 1934 and returning to the north side in 1977, with a few exceptions.

Interments in the wall were strictly individual. Spouses and children of those interred in the wall had to be buried elsewhere. There were only four instances of group burials: the three-man crew of the Osoaviakhim-1 high-altitude balloon in 1934, the crew of a UTI-4 crash in 1939 (Anatoly Serov and Polina Osipenko), the crew of a MiG-15UTI crash in 1968 (Yuri Gagarin and Vladimir Seryogin), and the three-man crew of the Soyuz 11 spacecraft in 1971. In total, the wall accommodates the graves of 107 men and 8 women.

No remains interred in the wall were ever removed from it, including those of the people posthumously accused of "fascist conspiracy" (Sergei Kamenev) or political repressions (Andrey Vyshinsky).

Under Nikita Khrushchev and Leonid Brezhnev, the honor of interment in the Kremlin Wall was awarded posthumously by the Politburo. When members of the Politburo were not available immediately, Mikhail Suslov had the first call. Brezhnev overruled Suslov's decision at least once, voting to bury Semyon Budyonny in an individual grave. There were also at least two known cases when groups of professionals pressed the government to extend special honors to their deceased colleagues:

- In June 1962, following the death of Army General Andrey Khrulyov, a group of marshals pressed the Politburo to bury Khrulyov in the Kremlin Wall. Normally, generals of his rank were not entitled to this honor; Khrushchev was known to dislike Khrulyov and suggested burying him in Novodevichy Cemetery. The military prevailed, and Khrulyov was buried on Red Square.
- In January 1970 the official decision to bury Pavel Belyayev in Novodevichy Cemetery, already made public through newspapers, was confronted by fellow cosmonauts Valentina Tereshkova, Alexei Leonov, and Vladimir Shatalov who insisted that Belyaev deserved a place in the Kremlin Wall like Yuri Gagarin. According to Nikolai Kamanin's diaries, the cosmonauts, Shatalov in particular, pressed the issue despite knowing that the decision was made by Brezhnev and Alexei Kosygin and that the funeral commission would not dare to challenge it. Belyaev was buried as planned in Novodevichy. According to an alternative version of events, the choice of Novodevichy was decided by his widow's will before the official decision was published.
- In September 1971, Nikita Khrushchev's family requested that the Soviet government bury Khrushchev in the Kremlin Wall Necropolis. The Soviet government declined the offer; instead, Khrushchev was given a private state funeral and buried in Novodevichy Cemetery.
- In December 1971, Andrey Andreyevich Andreyev was buried in Novodevichy Cemetery. According to former Soviet Chairman Anastas Mikoyan, this was because Andrey Andreyev wanted to be buried next to his wife there.
- In July 1989, Andrei Andreyevich Gromyko was offered a grave in the Kremlin Wall Necropolis, but at the request of his family he was not buried near the Moscow Kremlin Wall but instead at the Novodevichy Cemetery.
- In September 2022, Mikhail Gorbachev, the last leader of the Soviet Union, was buried in Novodevichy Cemetery. Even though Gorbachev was granted approval by Russian presidents Boris Yeltsin and Vladimir Putin to be buried in the Kremlin Wall Necropolis, Gorbachev was buried in Novodevichy Cemetery in the same grave as his wife Raisa, as requested by his will.

On 26 April 1967, cosmonaut Vladimir Komarov, who died in the crash of his Soyuz 1 space capsule, was given a state funeral in Moscow, and his ashes were interred in the Kremlin Wall Necropolis. Komarov was posthumously awarded the Order of Lenin, for the second time, and the order of Hero of the Soviet Union.

The last person to be buried in the Kremlin Wall was Minister of Defence Dmitriy Ustinov, in December 1984.

Table: List of interments in the Kremlin Wall, 1925–1984

Year of burial	Number of burials	Names
1925	1	Miron Vladimirov
1926	1	Leonid Krasin
1927	2	Arthur MacManus, Charles Ruthenberg
1928	4	Bill Haywood, Jenő Landler, Ivan Skvortsov-Stepanov, Alexander Tsyurupa
1929	1	Ivan Lepse
1931	2	Mikhail Mikhailov-Ivanov, Vladimir Triandafillov
1932	5	Kuprian Kirkizh, Yuri Larin, Mikhail Pokrovsky, Alexander Stopani, Pyotr Stuchka
1933	8	Pyotr Baranov, Abram Goltzman, Sergey Gusev, Sen Katayama, Anatoly Lunacharsky, Mikhail Olminsky, Alexey Svidersky, Clara Zetkin
1934	5	Osoaviakhim-1 crew (Pavel Fedoseenko, Ilya Usyskin, Andrey Vasenko), Valerian Dovgalevsky, Sergey Kirov, Vyacheslav Menzhinsky, Aleksandr Shteyngart
1935	3	Valerian Kuybyshev, Pyotr Smidovich, Ivan Tovstukha
1936	4	Maxim Gorky, Fritz Heckert, Sergei Kamenev, Alexander Karpinsky
1937	2	Grigoriy Ordzhonikidze, Maria Ulyanova
1938	1	Valery Chkalov
1939	3	Nadezhda Krupskaya, Polina Osipenko, Anatoly Serov
1943	4	Grigory Kravchenko, Konstantin Pamfilov, Marina Raskova, Yemelyan Yaroslavsky
1944	1	Klavdiya Nikolayeva
1945	2	Boris Shaposhnikov, Aleksandr Shcherbakov
1946	1	Vladimir Potemkin
1947	2	Vasily Vakhrushev, Rosalia Zemlyachka
1949	1	Fyodor Tolbukhin
1951	2	Mikhail Vladimirsky, Aleksandr Yefremov
1953	1	Lev Mekhlis
1954	3	Matvey Shkiryatov, Anatoly Kuzmin, Andrei Vyshinsky
1955	1	Leonid Govorov
1956	4	Pavel Yudin, Ivan Likhachev, Ivan Nosenko, Avraami Zavenyagin
1957	2	Vyacheslav Malyshev, Sergey Zhuk
1958	2	Grigory Petrovsky, Ivan Tevosian
1959	1	Gleb Krzhizhanovsky
1960	2	Igor Kurchatov, Mitrofan Nedelin
1961	1	Mikhail Khrunichev
1962	3	Boris Vannikov, Andrey Khrulyov, Aleksei Antonov
1963	2	Nikolai Dygay, Vladimir Kucherenko
1964	2	Otto Wille Kuusinen, Sergey Biryuzov
1965	2	Frol Kozlov, Sergei Kurashov.
1966	4	Sergei Korolyov, Alexander Rudakov, Nikolai Ignatov, Elena Stasova
1967	2	Vladimir Komarov, Rodion Malinovsky
1968	6	Nikolai Voronov, Yuri Gagarin, Vladimir Seryogin, Vasily Sokolovsky, Konstantin Rokossovsky, Kirill Meretskov
1970	3	Semyon Timoshenko, Andrey Yeryomenko, Nikolai Shvernik
1971	1	Soyuz 11 crew (Georgy Dobrovolsky, Viktor Patsayev, Vladislav Volkov)
1972	2	Matvey Zakharov, Nikolay Krylov
1973	1	Ivan Konev
1974	1	Georgy Zhukov
1976	2	Andrei Grechko, Ivan Yakubovsky
1977	1	Aleksandr Vasilevsky
1978	2	Mstislav Keldysh, Fyodor Kulakov
1980	1	Alexei Kosygin
1982	1	Ivan Bagramyan
1983	1	Arvīds Pelše
1984	2	Leonid Kostandov, Dmitry Ustinov

== Individual tombs, 1919–1985 ==
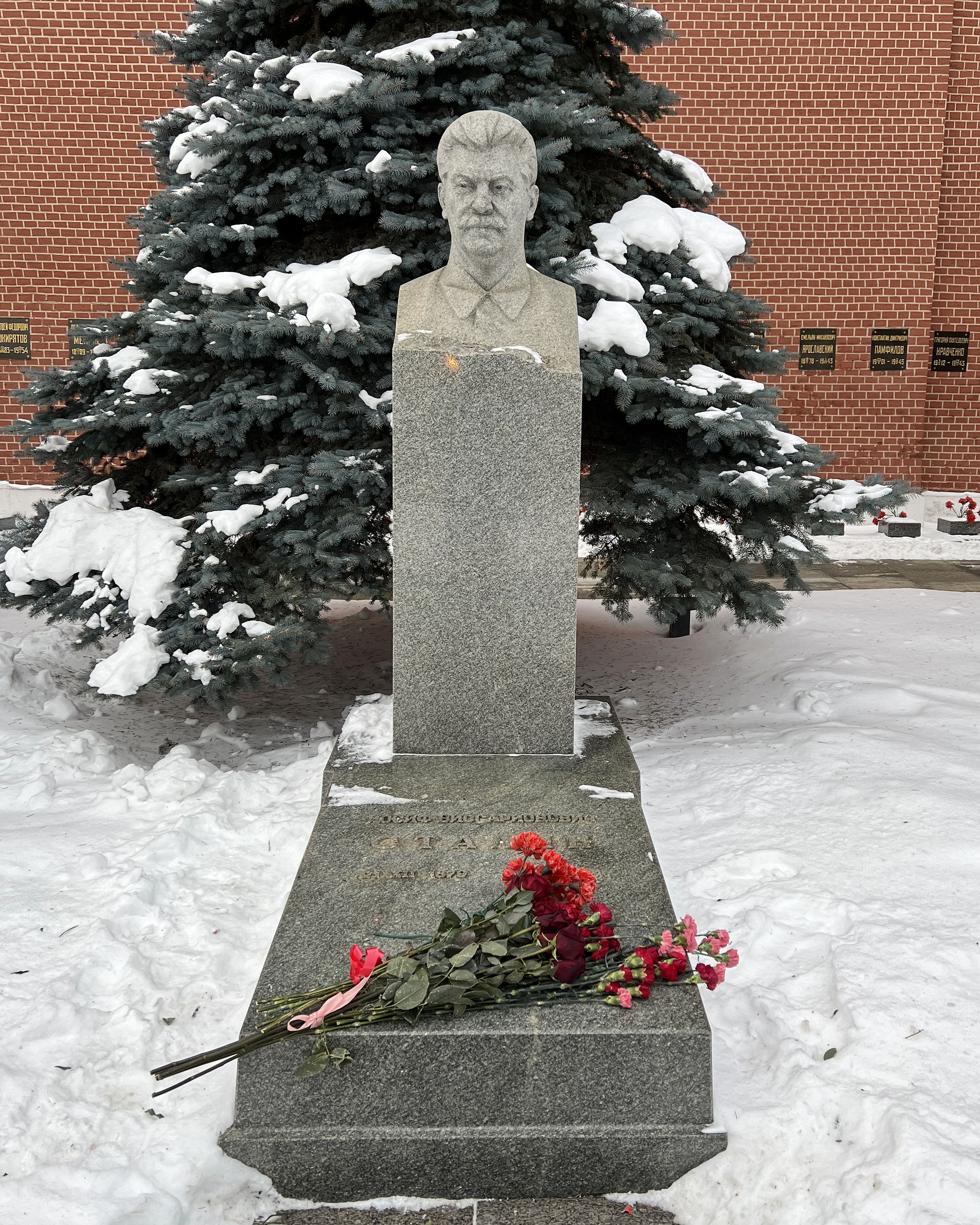
The grave of Joseph Stalin

The row of individual tombs behind the Mausoleum began to acquire its present shape after the end of World War II. Sergei Merkurov created the first five tombs, for the recently deceased Mikhail Kalinin and Andrey Zhdanov, as well as for Yakov Sverdlov, Mikhail Frunze and Felix Dzerzhinsky who had died decades earlier. Grey granite stands that separate Red Square from the wall were built in the same period. In 1947 Merkurov proposed rebuilding the Mausoleum into a sort of "Pergamon Altar" that would become a foreground to a statue of Stalin, placed atop Senatskaya tower. Dmitry Chechulin, Vera Mukhina and others spoke against the proposal and it was soon dropped.

There are twelve individual tombs. All, including the four burials of the 1980s, are shaped similar to the canonical Merkurov's model. All twelve are considered to have died of natural causes, although some, such as Mikhail Frunze, had unusual circumstances associated with their deaths. Konstantin Chernenko, who died in March 1985, became the last person to be buried on Red Square. Former head of state Andrei Gromyko, who died in July 1989, was offered burial in the Necropolis near his predecessors, but was eventually buried at the Novodevichy cemetery at the request of his family.

The Kremlin Wall and the stands erected in the 1940s were traditionally separated with a line of blue spruce (Picea pungens), a tree not occurring naturally in Russia. In August–September 2007 the aging trees, with few exceptions, were cut down and replaced with young trees. A Federal Protective Service spokesman explained that the previous generation of spruce, planted in the 1970s, suffered from the dryness of the urban landscape. 28 old but sound trees were handpicked for replanting inside the Kremlin.

New trees were selected from the nurseries of Altai Mountains, Russian Far East and "some foreign countries". The FPS spokesman also mentioned that in Nikita Khrushchev's period there were plans to plant a fruit garden around the Mausoleum, but the proposal was rejected out of concern for fruit flies.

Table: List of individual tombs on Red Square, 1946–1985

Year of burial	Name of the deceased	Sculptor of the monument
1919	Yakov Sverdlov	Sergei Merkurov, 1946
1925	Mikhail Frunze	Sergei Merkurov, 1946
1926	Felix Dzerzhinsky	Sergei Merkurov, 1946
1946	Mikhail Kalinin	Sergei Merkurov, 1946
1948	Andrei Zhdanov	Sergei Merkurov, 1948
1961	Joseph Stalin (died 1953)	Nikolai Tomsky, 1970
1969	Kliment Voroshilov	Nikolai Bratsun, 1970
1973	Semyon Budyonny	Nikolai Tomsky, 1975
1982	Mikhail Suslov	Iulian Rukavishnikov, 1983
1982	Leonid Brezhnev	Iulian Rukavishnikov, 1983
1984	Yuri Andropov	Viktor Sonin, 1985
1985	Konstantin Chernenko	Lev Kerbel, 1986

== Debate and preservation ==
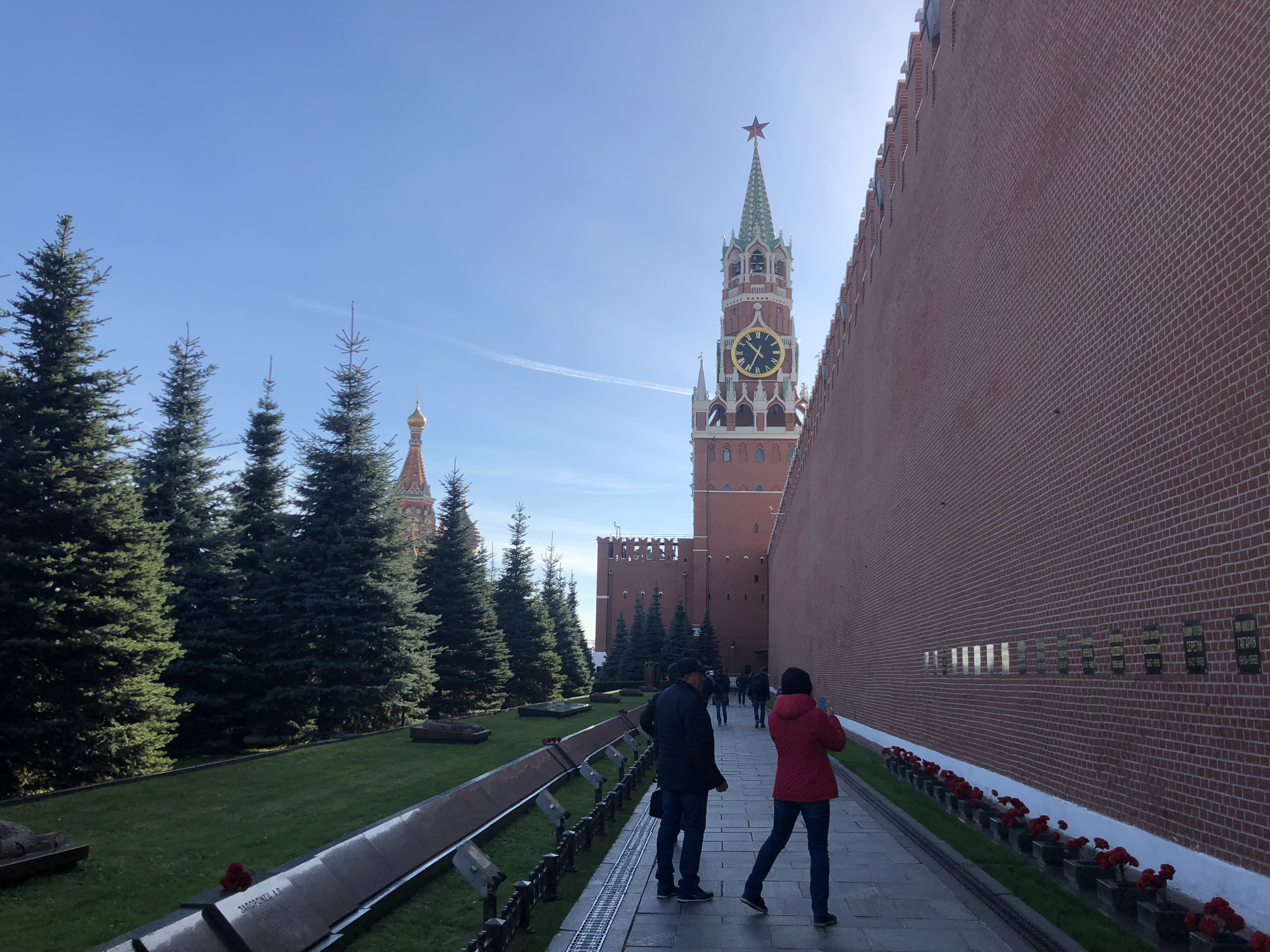
The Kremlin Necropolis with a view of Spasskaya Tower

Public discussion on closing the Mausoleum emerged shortly after the breakup of the Soviet Union, with opinions ranging from simply burying Lenin in Saint Petersburg in accordance with his request, to taking the mummy on a commercial world tour. After the climax of the 1993 Russian constitutional crisis, President Boris Yeltsin removed the honor guard from the Mausoleum (former Post no.1, see Kremlin Regiment) and voiced his opinion that Lenin should eventually be buried in the ground. This decision was supported by the Public Committee of Democratic Organisations. By 1995, Yeltsin had "moved to the nationalist center", using the Mausoleum as a government stand like previous state leaders. In 1997, he reiterated his proposal regarding Lenin's burial.

Proposals to remove the Necropolis from Red Square altogether met with far more public opposition and did not come to fruition. Despite the Russian government's efforts to relocate Lenin's tomb and Soviet monuments out of the Kremlin, support of both Lenin and the Soviet Union remained steadfast among the Russian populace. Public opinion on preserving Lenin's remains in their embalmed state was split but leaned towards burial.

A late 2008 VTsIOM poll found that 66% of respondents supported a funeral in a traditional cemetery, including 28% of those who believed that the funeral should be postponed until the communist generation passes away. 25% of respondents thought the body should be preserved in the Mausoleum. In October 2005, 51% of respondents had expressed support for a funeral and 40% for preservation.

== See also ==
- Federal Military Memorial Cemetery
- List of national cemeteries by country
- Tomb of the Unknown Soldier (Moscow)
