= Aleksandr Rukavishnikov =

Russian sculptor

Aleksandr Yulianovich Rukavishnikov
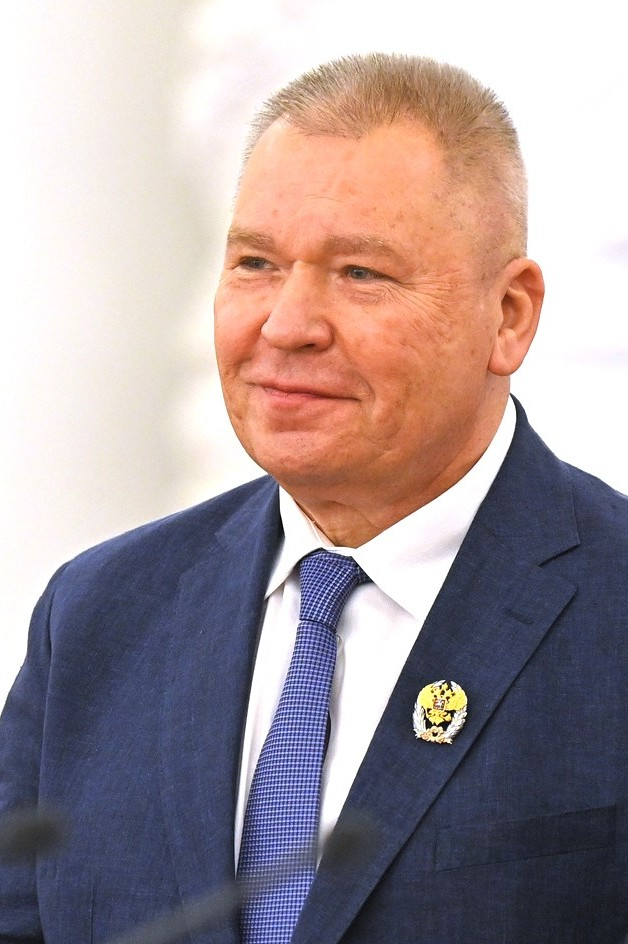
- Rukavishnikov in 2021
- Born: 2 October 1950; Moscow, Soviet Union
- Education: Surikov Moscow Art Institute
- Known for: Sculpture
- Movement: Realism

Aleksandr Yulianovich Rukavishnikov (Russian: Александр Иулианович Рукавишников; born 2 October 1950) is a Russian sculptor.

== Biography ==
Alexander Yulianovich Rukavishnikov was born to a family of sculptors Yulian Rukavishnikov and A. N. Filippova. Alexander Iulianovich is the third in a dynasty of hereditary sculptors. In 1974 he graduated with honors from the Surikov Moscow Art Institute (workshop of Lev Kerbel). For his thesis “Northern Fisherman” he receives a diploma with honors.

In 1984 he was awarded the honorary title “Honored Artist of the RSFSR”.

From 1986 to 1991 he was Secretary of the Board of the Union of Artists of the USSR. Since 1993, he has been the head of the Department of Sculpture at the Surikov Moscow Art Institute. In 1997 he was elected a full member of the Russian Academy of Arts.

Rukavishnikov is a regular participant in all-Russian and international art exhibitions. Rukavishnikov's personal exhibitions were held at the Central House of Artists and in the halls of the Russian Academy of Arts in Moscow, at the Nassau Museum of Contemporary Art (USA), at the Dielemann Gallery (Belgium) and in other museums and exhibition halls around the world.

The works of Rukavishnikov are kept in the collections of the Tretyakov Gallery, the Russian Museum, the Ludwig Museum, Siemens, Hermes, John Wilson, and numerous private and corporate collections.

In 2012, the Workshop of Alexander Rukavishnikov opened on Zemlyanoy Val.
