= Aleksandr Rudakov (Party figure) =

Soviet politician (1910–1966)

- Александр Рудаков
- Rudakov before 1966

Secretary of the Central Committee of the CPSU
- In office 23 November 1962 – 10 July 1966

Personal details
- Born: 11 September 1910 Pologi, Yekaterinoslav Province, Russian Empire
- Died: 10 July 1966 (aged 55) Moscow, Russian SFSR, Soviet Union
- Resting place: Kremlin Wall Necropolis
- Citizenship: Soviet Union
- Party: CPSU (1931–1966)
- Awards: 2 Orders of Lenin, Order of the Red Banner of Labour, Order of the Badge of Honour

Aleksandr Petrovich Rudakov (11 September 1910 – 10 July 1966) was a Soviet party figure and a Secretary of the Central Committee of CPSU from 1962 until his death in 1966. He was buried at the Kremlin Wall Necropolis.

== Biography ==
Rudakov was born into a peasant family in the village of Polohy, Aleksandrovsky district, Yekaterinoslav province (now a city in the Zaporizhzhya region in Ukraine).

Rudakov joined the CPSU in 1931. From 1954, he was the head of the heavy industry department of the CPSU Central Committee. Member of the Central Committee of the Communist Party of Ukraine (1952–1956), member of the Central Committee of the CPSU since 1962 (candidate since 1956).

In 1962, he was the Secretary of the CPSU Central Committee, responsible for industry. He was also a deputy of the Supreme Soviet of the USSR of the 6th–7th convocations.

== Death and awards ==
Rudakov died from natural causes in Moscow at the age of 55, he was buried at the Kremlin Wall Necropolis. He was awarded twice Orders of Lenin, an Order of the Red Banner of Labour and Order of the Badge of Honour.
