= Chekhov Monument, Taganrog =

Monument in Taganrog, Rostov, Russia

Coordinates: 47°12′37″N 38°55′20″E

Chekhov Monument
- Памятник А.П.Чехову
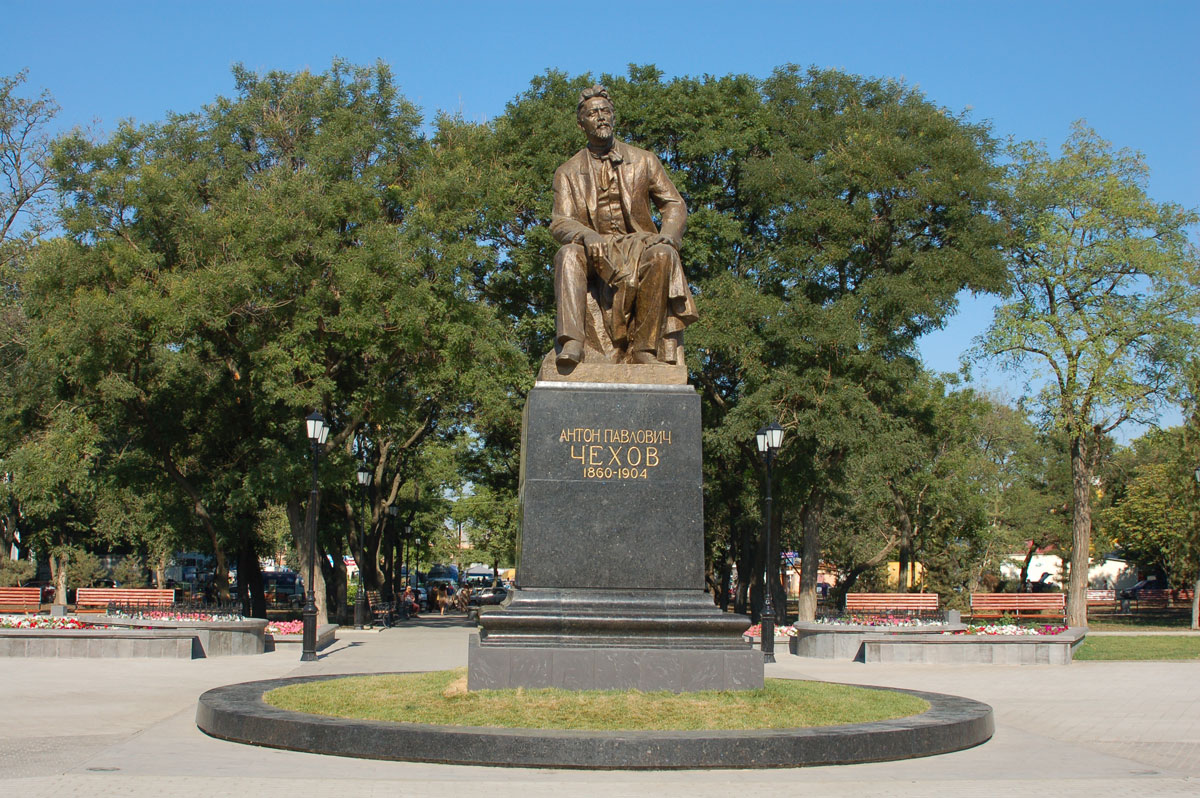
- Interactive map of Chekhov Monument
- Designer: G. A. Zakharov
- Height: 3 m (9.8 ft)
- Completion date: 1959
- Opening date: 29 January 1960
- Dedicated to: Anton Chekhov

The Chekov Monument is a statue of the writer Anton Chekhov in Taganrog, Russia, the city of his birth. Located on Chekhov Square, it was designed by G. A. Zakharov and sculpted by Iulian Rukavishnikov. It was unveiled on 29 January 1960, to coincide with the centennial anniversary of Chekhov's birth.

== History ==
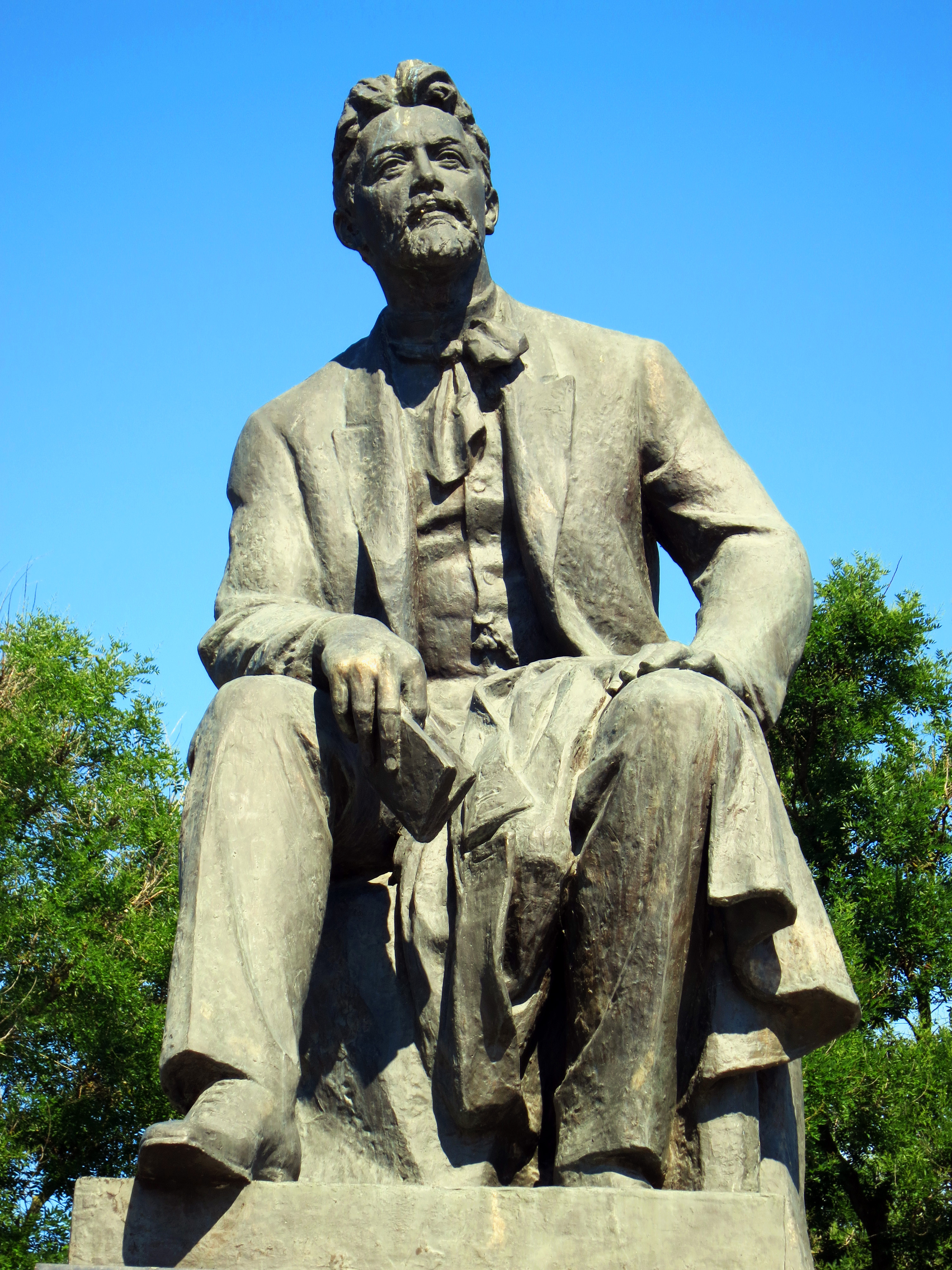
Close-up of the statue

The idea to erect a monument to Chekhov first came from the authorities in 1910. In 1944 the Council of People's Commissars decreed to erect a monument to Chekhov to commemorate the 40th anniversary of the writer's death.

By October 1954, 18 projects of the statue were submitted, and all of them were exhibited to the public in the Local Lore Museum of Taganrog. Three years later the Second Nationwide Contest was held in Moscow, where 30 projects of the statue were submitted. After the second round the best works were sent to Taganrog where the statue by Iulian Rukavishnikov earned universal approval.

The monument comprises a granite pedestal and a bronze statue showing Chekhov impeccably dressed, sitting on the stone, looking into the distance and holding a book in his right hand, his forefinger between pages as though he is reflecting on something deep. The height of the monument is 3 m (9.84 ft).

Chekhov Square was planted in the Red Square (in front of Alexandrovskiye Trade Rows) in Taganrog in 1934 to mark the writer's 75th anniversary in 1935.

The Chekhov Monument acts as a tribute paid by the people of Taganrog to their most renowned fellow townsman.

On 29 January 2010 the Russian president Dmitri Medvedev laid flowers to the monument within the framework of commemorative events of the 150th anniversary of Chekhov's birth in Taganrog.
