= List of inventors killed by their own invention =

This is a list of people whose deaths were in some manner caused by or directly related to a product, process, procedure, or other technological innovation that they invented or designed.

== Ill-fated inventors ==
=== Automotive ===
- Sylvester H. Roper (1823–1896), inventor of the Roper steam velocipede, died of a heart attack or subsequent crash during a public speed trial in 1896. It is unknown whether the crash caused the heart attack, or the heart attack caused the crash.
- William Nelson (c. 1879–1903), a General Electric employee, invented a new way to motorize bicycles. He fell off his prototype bike during a test run.
- Francis Edgar Stanley (1849–1918) was killed while driving a Stanley Steamer automobile. He drove his car into a woodpile while attempting to avoid farm wagons travelling side by side on the road.
- Fred Duesenberg (1876–1932) was killed in a high-speed road accident in a Duesenberg automobile.
- David Ogle (1921–1962) was killed in an auto accident when he lost control while driving the Ogle SX1000 he had designed.

=== Aviation ===
The death of Franz Reichelt (d. 1912), who jumped off the Eiffel Tower in an unsuccessful test of his wearable parachute.

- Ismail ibn Hammad al-Jawhari (died c. 1003–1010), a Kazakh Turkic scholar from Farab, attempted to fly using two wooden wings and a rope. He leapt from the roof of a mosque in Nishapur and fell to his death.
- Jean-François Pilâtre de Rozier (1754–1785) was the first known fatality in an air crash when his Rozière balloon crashed on 15 June 1785 while he and Pierre Romain attempted to cross the English Channel.
- Thomas Harris (d. 1824) invented the gas discharge valve, the first such device for emptying a lighter-than-air balloon of gas. He died when the cord attached to the gas discharge valve in his balloon tightened as it was deflated, releasing more gas than intended and crashing the balloon.
- Robert Cocking (1776–1837) died when his homemade parachute failed. Cocking failed to include the weight of the parachute in his calculations.
- Vincent de Groof (1830–1874) died after losing control of his ornithopter and crashing.
- Otto Lilienthal (1848–1896) died from injuries sustained in a crash of his hang glider.
- Percy Pilcher (1867–1899) died after crashing his glider, having been prevented from demonstrating his powered aircraft.
- Franz Reichelt (1879–1912), a tailor, fell to his death from the first deck of the Eiffel Tower during the initial test of a coat parachute which he invented. Reichelt promised the authorities he would use a dummy, but instead he confidently strapped himself into the garment at the last moment and made his leap in front of a camera crew.
- Aurel Vlaicu (1882–1913) died when his self-constructed airplane, A Vlaicu II, failed during an attempt to cross the Carpathian Mountains.
- Victims of the 1930 crash of the British R101 airship included designers Vincent Crane Richmond and Michael Rope, along with Secretary of State for Air Lord Thomson who proposed the voyage, Air Vice Marshal Sir Sefton Brancker, responsible for its safety certification, and Director of Airship Development Reginald Colmore, who had managed its construction and overruled a safety inspection that recommended rebuilding.
- Henry Smolinski (1933–1973) was killed during a test flight of the AVE Mizar, a flying car based on the Ford Pinto and the sole product of the company he founded.
- Charles Ligeti (d. 1987) was killed in a crash in 1987 when testing modifications to his Ligeti Stratos aircraft of novel closed wing design.
- Ellis V. Eichman (1913-1997) died during the maiden test flight of the Aerobat III in Brownsville, Texas.
- Michael Dacre (1956–2009) died after a crash that occurred while testing his flying taxi device.
- John Williams (d. 2024) was killed when his replica P-51 airplane, designed and built by his own company, crashed into a tree during a failed landing.

=== Industrial ===
- Carlisle Spedding (1695–1755); was a mining engineer, inventor and colliery manager who worked in mines owned by Sir James Lowther. Spedding, along with his elder brother James, introduced many improvements to the mining industry, especially relating to drainage and ventilation, which did much to improve safety for miners. In 1730, Spedding invented a mechanical device, consisting of a pair of geared wheels that forced a flint against a rotating steel disc, giving off a shower of sparks to provide some illumination. This, named the "Spedding Steel Mill", was allegedly safer than the use of a naked flame, and until the invention of the Davy and Stephenson safety lamps many decades later, was widely used in mines. Carlisle Spedding was killed in an underground gas explosion on 8 August 1755 in Whitehaven, Cumbria, said to have been caused by one of his steel mills.
- William Bullock (1813–1867) invented the web rotary printing press. Several years after its invention, his foot was crushed during the installation of a new machine in Philadelphia. The crushed foot developed gangrene and Bullock died during the amputation.
- Sabin Arnold von Sochocky (1883–1928) was an inventor of the luminescent paint (used for clocks in early 20th century) based on radioactive radium (previously discovered by Pierre and Marie Curie). He was a founder of the United States Radium Corporation, where some of its workers died from radium poisoning. He eventually died of aplastic anemia.

=== Maritime ===
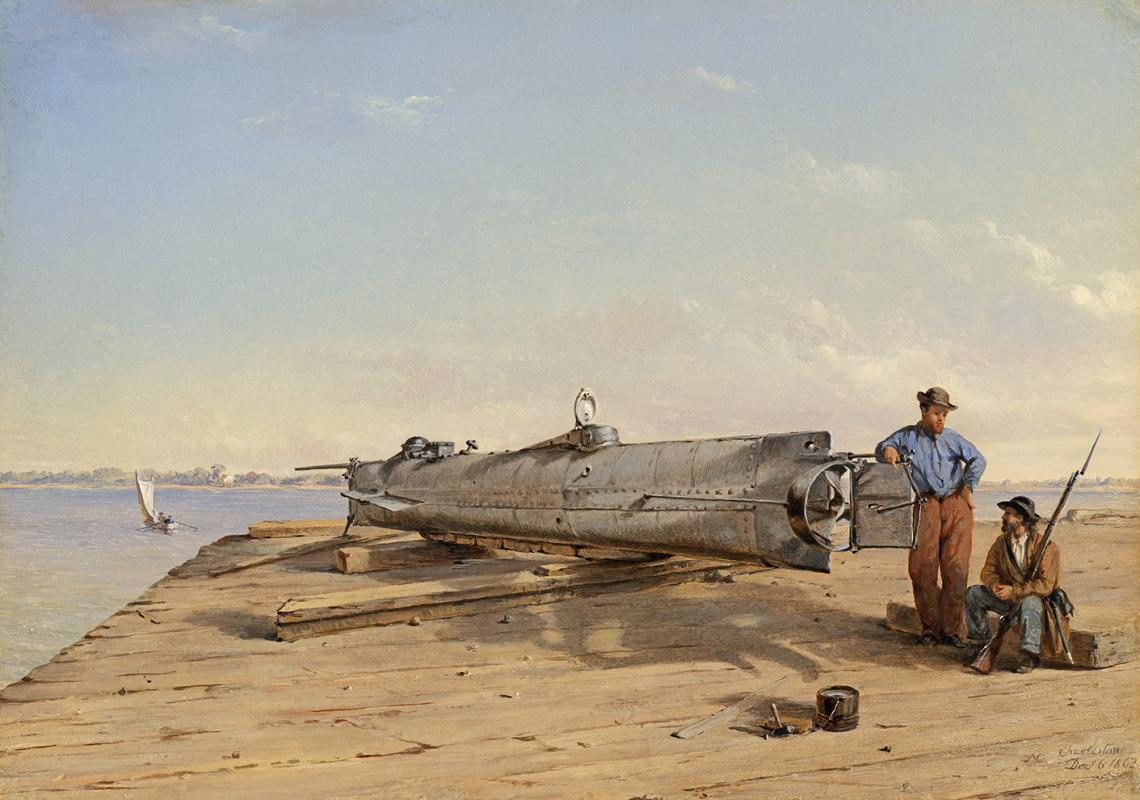
Submarine Torpedo Boat H.L. Hunley, Dec. 6, 1863 by Conrad Wise Chapman (1864)

- Henry Winstanley (1644–1703) designed and built the world's first offshore lighthouse on the Eddystone Rocks in Devon, England between 1696 and 1698. Boasting of the safety of his invention, he expressed a desire to shelter inside it "during the greatest storm there ever was". During the Great Storm of 1703, the lighthouse was completely destroyed with Winstanley and five other men inside. No trace of them was found.
- John Day (c. 1740–1774) was an English carpenter and wheelwright who died during a test of his experimental diving chamber.
- Horace Lawson Hunley (1823–1863) was a Confederate American marine engineer who built the H. L. Hunley submarine and perished inside it as a member of the second crew to face drownings while testing the experimental vessel. After Hunley's death, the Confederates raised the vessel for another mission that proved fatal for its own crew: the successful sinking of the USS Housatonic during the American Civil War. The feat made the H. L. Hunley the first submarine to sink an enemy warship in wartime.
- Karl Flach (1821–1866) was a German living in Valparaiso, Chile. He built the submarine Flach (brother of the Peruvian "Toro", sunk, raised by the Chilean Navy and then disappeared, both events in the Saltpeter War) at the request of the Chilean government, in response to the bombing of Valparaíso. He died after the submarine failed to surface, along with his son and other sailors.
- Julius H. Kroehl (1820–1867), a German-American inventor and former Union Navy contractor, is thought to have died of decompression sickness after experimental dives with the Sub Marine Explorer, which he co-designed and constructed with his business partner Ariel Patterson.
- Cowper Phipps Coles (1819–1870) was a Royal Navy captain who drowned with approximately 480 others in the sinking of HMS Captain, a masted turret ship of his own design.
- William Pitt (1841–1909) was a Canadian ferryman who designed the underwater cable ferry as means of improving the former ferry used to connect the Kingston Peninsula to the Kennebecasis Valley in New Brunswick. In 1909, Pitt died after sustaining injuries caused by falling into his ferry's machinery.
- Thomas Andrews (1873–1912), the naval architect of the Titanic, designed his famous vessel while serving as the managing director and head of the drafting department of the shipbuilding company Harland and Wolff in Belfast, Ireland. He was aboard the Titanic during her maiden voyage and perished alongside approximately 1,500 others when the ship hit an iceberg and sank on 14 April 1912. Andrews' body was never recovered.
- Stockton Rush (1962–2023) was a pilot, engineer, and businessman who oversaw the design and construction of the OceanGate submersible Titan, used to take tourists to view the wreck of the Titanic. On 18 June 2023, the craft imploded during a dive to the Titanic, killing Rush and four other passengers. Rush had spent years staunchly defending his unregulated design, claiming that "at some point, safety is just pure waste. I mean, if you just want to be safe, don't get out of bed, don't get in your car, don't do anything".

=== Medical ===
- Alexander Bogdanov (1873–1928) was a Russian polymath, Bolshevik revolutionary and pioneer haemotologist who founded the first Institute of Blood Transfusion in 1926. He died from acute hemolytic transfusion reaction after carrying out an experimental mutual blood transfusion between himself and a 21-year-old student with an inactive case of tuberculosis. Bogdanov's hypotheses were that the younger man's blood would rejuvenate his own aging body, and that his own blood, which he believed was resistant to tuberculosis, would treat the student's disease.
- Thomas Midgley Jr. (1889–1944) was an American engineer and chemist who contracted polio at age 51, leaving him severely disabled. He devised an elaborate system of ropes and pulleys to help others lift him from bed. He became entangled in the ropes and died of strangulation at the age of 55. However, he is better known for two of his other inventions: the tetraethyl lead (TEL) additive to gasoline, and chlorofluorocarbons (CFCs).

=== Physics ===
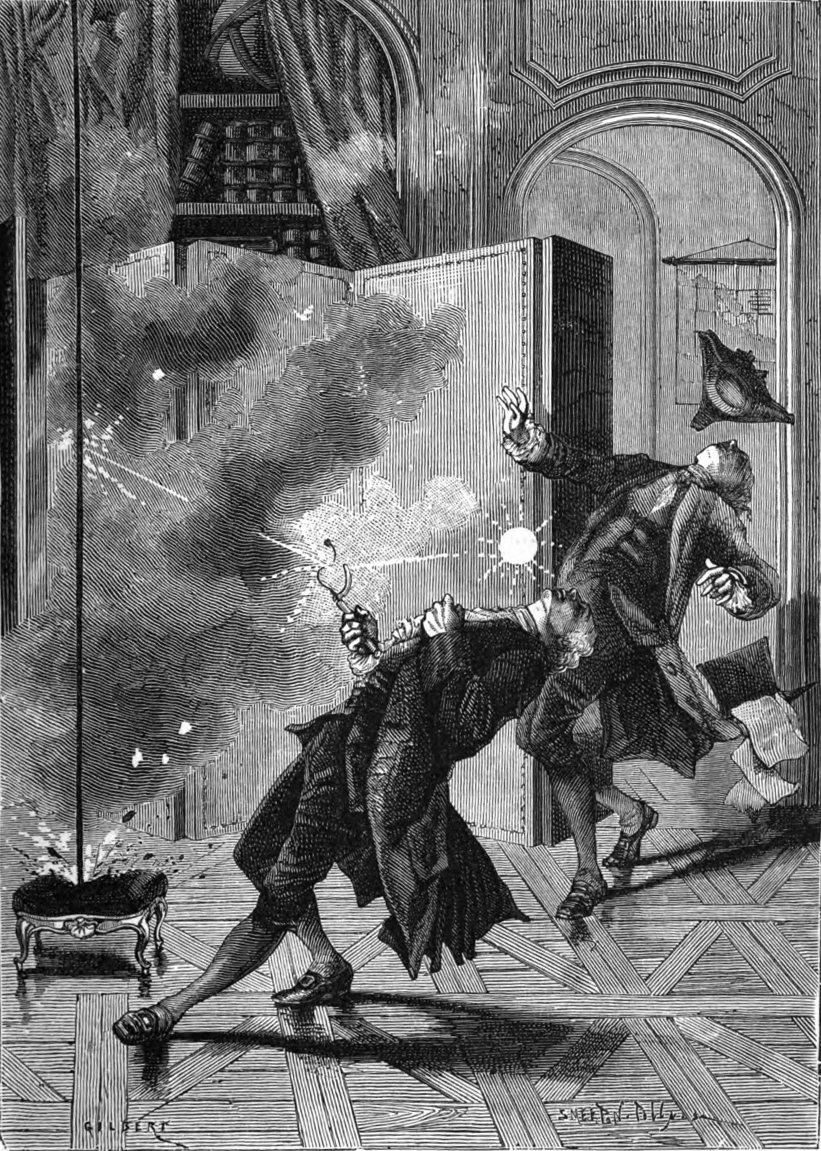
Richmann and his engraver during the electrocution in St. Petersburg

- Georg Wilhelm Richmann (1711–1753) built an apparatus to study electricity from lightning. While "trying to quantify the response of an insulated rod to a nearby storm," it produced a ball of lightning that struck him in the forehead and killed him.
- Clarence Madison Dally (1865–1904) was an employee of Thomas Edison tasked with developing a focused X-ray tube, the fluoroscope. It was derived from but had greater luminosity than Wilhelm Röntgen's 1895 design. As a result, Dally was exposed to significant doses of ionizing X-radiation and eventually contracted fatal mediastinal tumors.

=== Publicity and entertainment ===
- Karel Soucek (1947–1985) was a Czech professional stuntman living in Canada who developed a shock-absorbent barrel. He died following a demonstration involving the barrel being dropped from the roof of the Houston Astrodome. He was fatally injured when his barrel hit the rim of the water tank meant to cushion his fall.

=== Railway ===
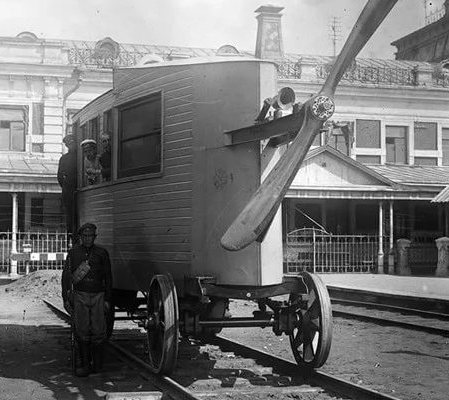
Valerian Abakovsky's Aerowagon, a propeller-driven wooden railcar which crashed in 1921, killing Abakovsky and six others

- Webster Wagner (1817–1882) died in a train accident, crushed between two of the railway sleeper cars he had invented.
- Henri Thuile (died 1900), inventor of the large high-speed Thuile steam locomotive, died during a test run between Chartres and Orléans. Conflicting accounts indicate that he was either thrown from the derailing locomotive, hitting a telegraph pole, or that he simply leaned too much and was instantly killed by hitting his head against a piece of bridge scaffolding.
- Valerian Abakovsky (1895–1921) constructed the Aerowagon, an experimental high-speed railcar fitted with an aircraft engine and propeller traction, intended to carry Soviet officials. On 24 July 1921, it derailed at high speed, killing seven of the 22 on board, including Abakovsky.

=== Rocketry ===
- Max Valier (1895–1930) invented liquid-fuelled rocket engines as a member of the 1920s German rocket society Verein für Raumschiffahrt. On 17 May 1930, an alcohol-fuelled engine exploded on his test bench in Berlin, killing him instantly.
- Mike Hughes (1956–2020) was killed when the parachute failed to deploy during a crash landing while piloting his homemade steam-powered rocket.

=== Vertical transport ===
- In late April 2025, an 85-year-old man from Thuringia, Germany, died when using his self-made elevator.

== Popular legends and related stories ==
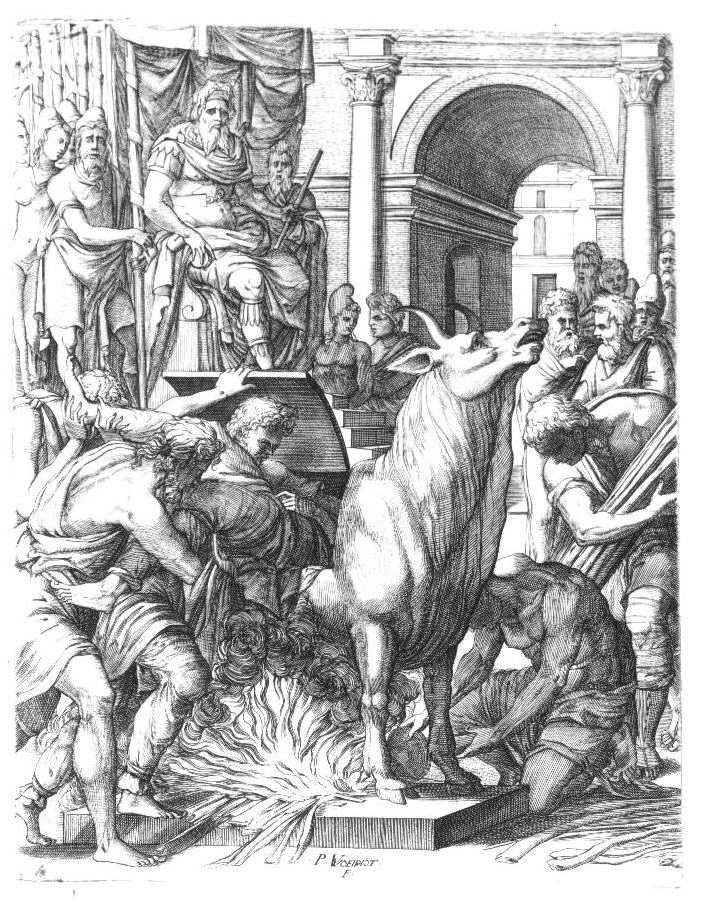
Perillos being pushed into his brazen bull

- In Greek mythology, Daedalus built wings made of feathers and blankets to escape the labyrinth of Crete with his son Icarus, who died while ignoring his father's instructions not to "fly too close to the sun".
- Perillos of Athens (c. 550 BCE), according to legend, was the first to be roasted in the brazen bull he made for Phalaris of Sicily for executing criminals.
- Li Si (208 BCE), Prime Minister during the Qin dynasty, was executed by the Five Punishments method which some sources claim he had devised. However, the history of the Five Punishments is traced further back in time than Li Si.
- Wan Hu, a possibly apocryphal 16th-century Chinese official, is said to have attempted to launch himself into outer space in a chair to which 47 rockets were attached. The rockets exploded, and it is said that neither he nor the chair were ever seen again.
- João Torto, a most likely apocryphal 16th-century Portuguese man who jumped from the top of Viseu Cathedral wearing a biplane-like flying rig and an eagle-shaped helmet.
- Orban, the designer and manufacturer of the Basilic, a gigantic cannon used to break down the walls of Constantinople in 1453, died when one of his cannons exploded in battle.
- In The Adventures of Philip by William Makepeace Thackeray, the narrator, Pendennis, relates the popular misconception, "Was not the good Dr Guillotin executed by his own neat invention?" In fact, Joseph-Ignace Guillotin was neither the inventor of the guillotine nor executed by it.

== See also ==
- Darwin Awards, tongue-in-cheek awards honoring persons who died as a result of their conspicuously stupid mistakes
- List of entertainers who died during a performance
- List of unusual deaths
- Hoist with his own petard, a quote from Shakespeare's Hamlet, indicating an ironic reversal or an instance of poetic justice
- Luis Jiménez, a sculptor who was killed when part of one of his sculptures fell on him
