= Aerowagon =

Soviet railcar powered by aircraft engine

Аэроваго́н
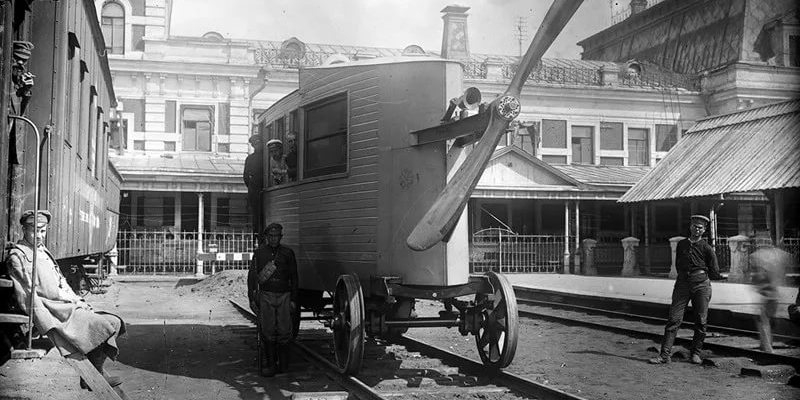
- Abakovsky's Aerowagon (Front View)
- Manufacturer: Valerian Ivanovich Abakovsky
- Built at: Russian SFSR
- Constructed: 1917
- Scrapped: 1921 (destroyed)
- Number built: 1

Specifications
- Maximum speed: 140 kilometres per hour (87 mph)
- Prime mover: Aircraft engine

The Aerowagon or Aeromotowagon (Russian: аэроваго́н, аэродрези́на, romanized: aerovagon, aerodrezina) was an experimental high-speed railcar fitted with an aircraft engine and propeller traction invented by Valerian Abakovsky, a Soviet engineer from Latvia. It produced speeds of up to 140 kilometres per hour (87 miles per hour). The Aerowagon was originally intended for the express transportation of important documents and to carry Soviet officials on government business.

== Crash incident ==
On 24 July 1921, a group of delegates to the First Congress of the Profintern, led by Fyodor Sergeyev, took the Aerowagon from Moscow to the Tula collieries to meet with local miners and to visit an arms factory. Abakovsky was also on board. Although they successfully arrived in Tula, on the return route to Moscow the Aerowagon derailed at high speed near Serpukhov, killing six of the 22 people on board. A seventh man (Paul Freeman) later died of his injuries.

An official investigation concluded that the cause of the derailment was the poor condition of the railway track. Artyom Sergeyev (the son of victim Fyodor Sergeyev and also the adopted son of Joseph Stalin) claimed sabotage arranged by Trotsky.

=== Deaths ===
The following people died as a result of the accident:

- Ivan Konstantinov, Bulgarian delegate
- Paul Freeman, Australian delegate
- Oskar Hellbrück, German delegate
- William James Hewlett, British delegate
- Fyodor Sergeyev (known as "Comrade Artyom")
- Otto Strupat, German delegate
- Valerian Abakovsky, the Aerowagon's inventor

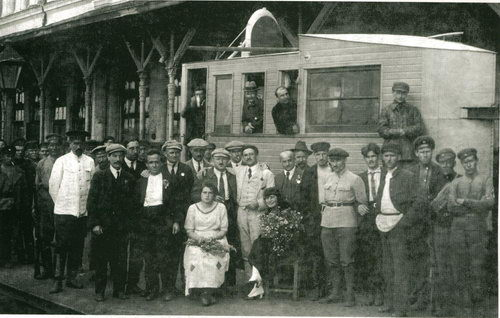
The last lifetime photograph of Fyodor Sergeyev near the air car of Abakovsky during the third Congress of the Comintern and the first Congress of the Profintern.

All seven men lay in state at the House of the Unions, after which they were buried with honors in the Kremlin Wall Necropolis. Sergeyev is buried in Mass Grave No. 12, Konstantinov, Abakovsky and Freeman are buried in Mass Grave No. 13, while Strupat, Helbrich and Hewlett are buried in Mass Grave No. 14.

== Similar designs ==
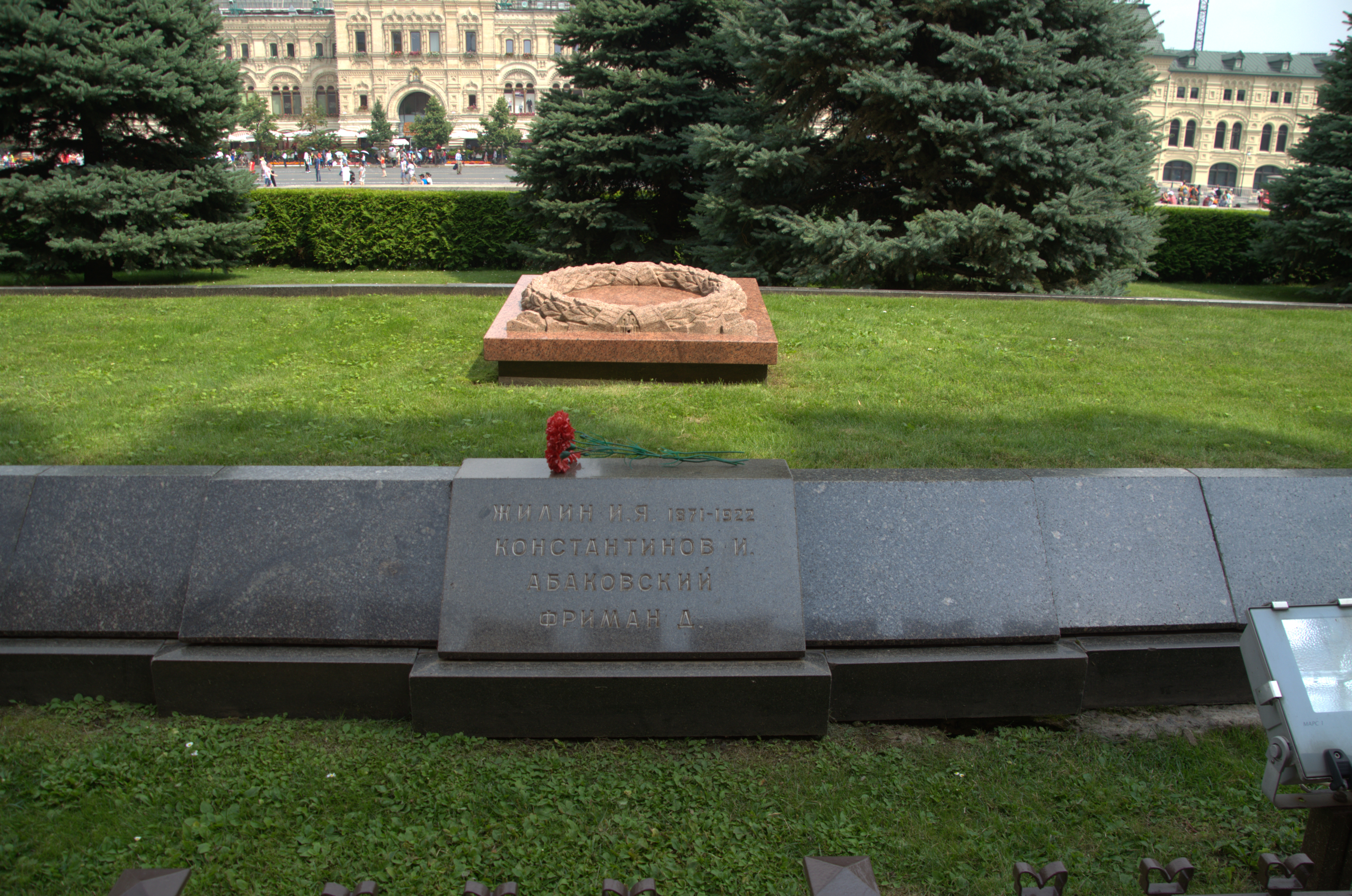
Red Square Mass Grave No. 13, where also the Aerowagon crash victims Konstantinov, Abakovsky and Freeman are buried.

The Aerowagon was a precursor to the German Schienenzeppelin railcar, the American M-497 Black Beetle railcar, the Soviet turbojet train and the French Aérotrain, all of them being experimental vehicles featuring the combination of railcar and aircraft engines.

== See also ==
- List of inventors killed by their own invention

== Bibliography ==
- Alexey Abramov / Алексей Абрамов, By the Kremlin Wall / У кремлёвской стены, Moscow / Москва́, Politizdat / Политиздат, 1978, pp./стр. 399 (in Russian)
