= Paul Freeman (communist) =

Australian communist activist (1884–1921)

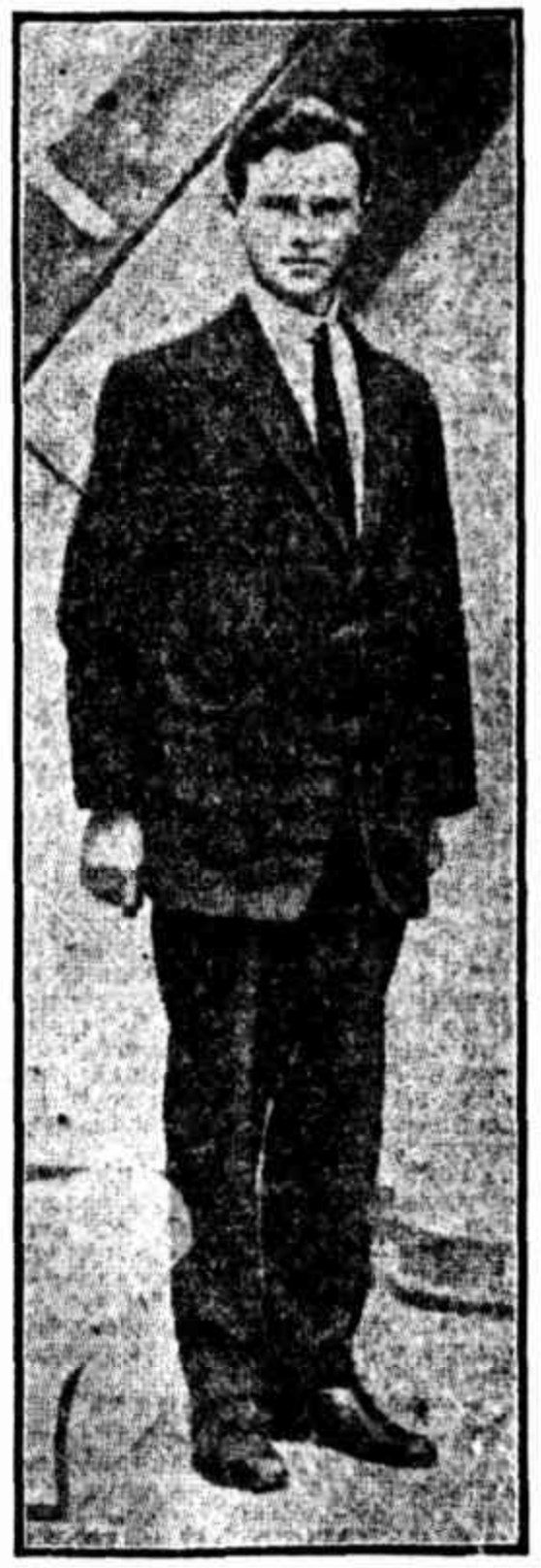
Photograph of Freeman published in The Daily Standard in 1919

Paul Freeman (c. 1884 – 24 July 1921) was a political activist known for his deportation from Australia in 1919 and his subsequent role as a liaison between the Communist International and the Australian communist movement.

Freeman's origins are unclear, although he was probably American. He arrived in Australia in 1909 and lived for several years in Broken Hill, New South Wales, where he became involved with militant leftist groups. He later worked as a miner and prospector in Queensland. In 1918, after leading a strike at the Mount Elliott Copper Mine, Freeman was expelled from the country without trial under emergency war-time powers. His deportation became a cause célèbre amongst the local labour movement, whose direct action tactics ultimately failed to prevent his removal from the country.

In 1920, Freeman travelled to Soviet Russia and secured the patronage of Bolshevik leader Fyodor Sergeyev, who had previously spent time in Australia. He was dispatched to Australia under an alias with the aim of encouraging the small local communist movement, but was embroiled in factional conflict. Freeman returned to Russia in 1921 leading the Australian delegation to the Communist International and Red International of Labor Unions. He was subsequently killed in the wreck of the Aerowagon, an experimental high-speed railcar, and became one of the few Westerners interred at the Kremlin Wall Necropolis.

== Early life ==
Freeman's origins are uncertain, but he was "most likely American-born, possibly a Canadian and possibly again of German parentage". His 1981 entry in the Australian Dictionary of Biography concluded that he was probably born in Germany in about 1884, but later research published in 1989 noted that there is "little or no direct evidence of German birth". In Australia, Freeman registered as an American citizen in 1916, although he would later be refused entry to the United States. He was described by a colleague in the labour movement as having an American accent, while a police report noted "a very strong German accent". He also once told a reporter from The Australian Worker that he was Canadian. Before moving to Australia he claimed to have worked as a coal miner in Pennsylvania, a silver miner in Nevada, and at various copper mines elsewhere in the United States.

== Australia ==
Freeman first arrived in Australia in 1909 aboard SS Zealandia. By 1911 he was working as a miner in Broken Hill, New South Wales, where he was an acquaintance of future federal MP Michael Considine. He joined the Australian Socialist Party (ASP) and the Industrial Workers of the World (IWW), which had a strong local presence, and in September 1914 took part in the "Battle of Broken Hill", a clash between militant anti-war activists and new Australian Imperial Force recruits.

By 1917 Freeman was living in Queensland, where he joined the Australian Workers' Union (AWU). He worked as a copper miner in Cloncurry for a period, and later as a prospector. In June 1917 he and future senator Gordon Brown addressed a beachfront protest in Townsville against the imprisonment of the Sydney Twelve. He also campaigned against overseas conscription in the 1916 and 1917 referendums. In May 1918, Freeman was one of the leaders of a strike at the Mount Elliott Copper Mine. At an open-air meeting he reportedly disparaged soldiers, allegedly stating that "a man who joined the Army was lower than a dog".

Although he denied making anti-soldier remarks, Freeman's activities brought him to the attention of the mine's management, and in October 1918 he was reported to Military Intelligence as an "undesirable alien". William Henry Corbould, the mine's general manager, was widely suspected of having lobbied for his deportation, but this was denied by Corbould and government officials. Both Military Intelligence and the Queensland Police compiled reports on Freeman, noting his association with radical groups but failing to find evidence that he had committed an offence or prove membership of a proscribed organisation. Chief of the General Staff James Legge nonetheless recommended to Defence Minister George Pearce that Freeman be removed from the country under emergency wartime powers. Pearce signed a deportation order on 24 December 1918.

=== Deportation ===
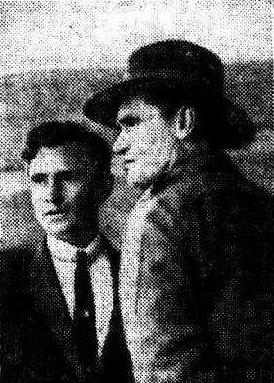
Freeman (left) with a member of his military guard, following his unsuccessful deportation

On 8 January 1919, Freeman was arrested in his tent 10 miles (16 km) outside of the small mining settlement of Dobbyn. He was briefly imprisoned at Victoria Barracks, Brisbane, before being sent to Sydney where he was placed on board SS Sonoma bound for San Francisco. Freeman's deportation took place without trial under the War Precautions Act 1914; he was never charged with any offence.

The first attempt to deport Freeman failed when Sonoma sustained a damaged propeller and returned to Sydney. He was interned at Darlinghurst Gaol for three days before being returned to Sonoma, in breach of the prison's own quarantine regulations during the Spanish flu pandemic. When the ship reached San Francisco, Freeman was denied entry to the United States despite his claims of American citizenship. He ultimately crossed the Pacific four times on Sonoma, being refused entry to both countries. In May 1919, with the ship berthed at Pyrmont, Freeman commenced a hunger strike to draw attention to his situation, which had previously been unknown to the public. His cause was quickly taken up by the labour press, with The Australian Worker stating that he had been "denied the justice which, under the constitution of this country, is supposed to be the inviolable right of every citizen".

Freeman's deportation became a cause célèbre in the Australian labour movement. In addition to the press campaign, his supporters employed direct action tactics, which included demonstrations, strikes and riots as well as an attempt to board the ship by force. Future federal MP Eddie Ward was among the workers injured in conflicts with police. Freeman was eventually removed from Sonoma after eight days on hunger strike. Although his removal was seen as a success for the labour movement, he remained in military custody and was held at Holsworthy Internment Camp. He was successfully deported on 11 October 1919, on a ship bound for Rotterdam.

== Russia and international communism ==
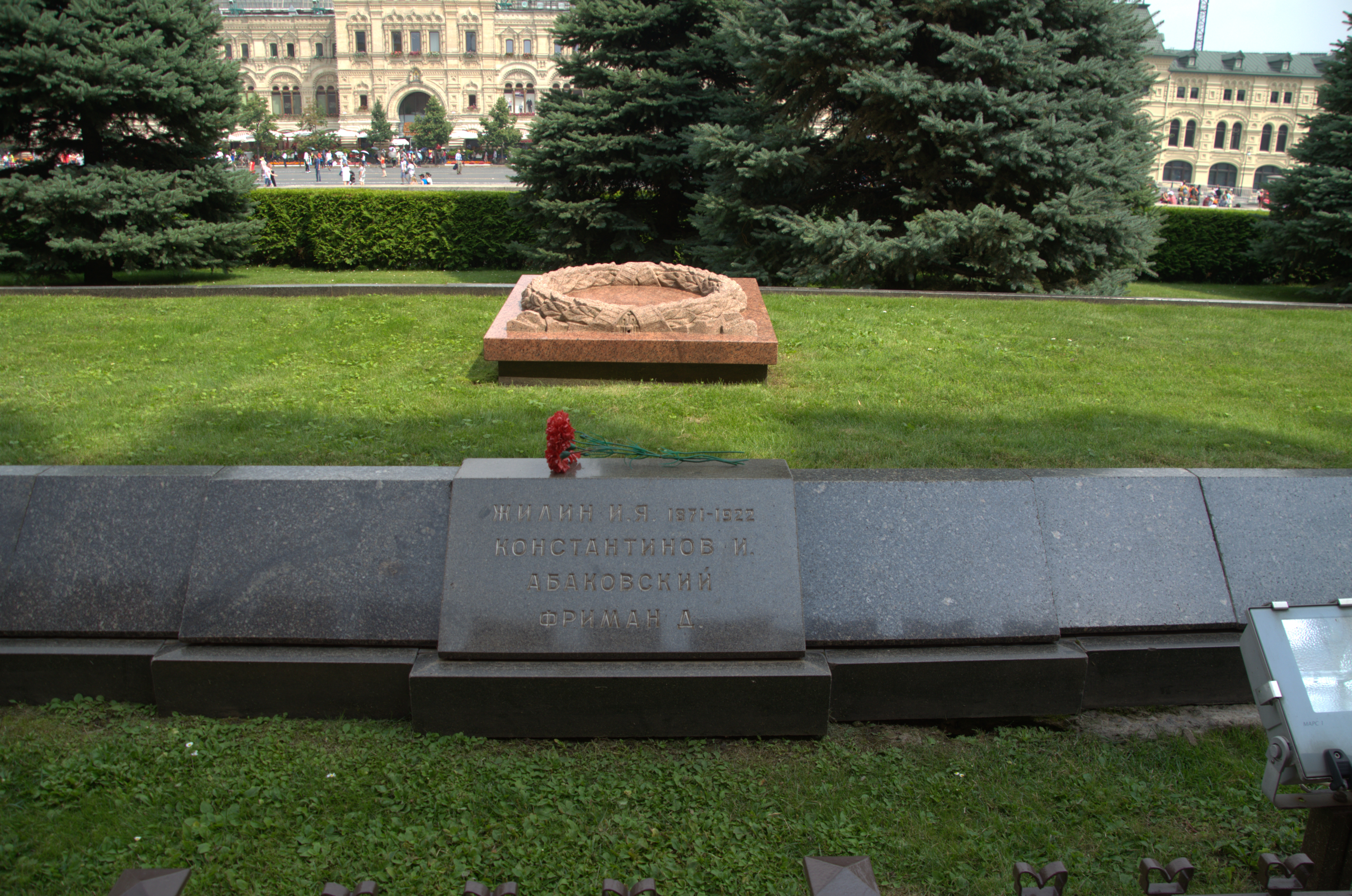
Grave of Freeman (Russian: Фриман, Д) at the Kremlin Wall Necropolis in 2016

Freeman entered Soviet Russia on 30 April 1920, travelling by way of Germany and Estonia. According to William Earsman, he intended to secure recognition as an Australian representative at the Second Congress of the Communist International, but was rejected due to his lack of credentials. By that time he had abandoned his earlier IWW-inspired anarcho-syndicalism and adopted Soviet-style revolutionary socialism.

Freeman came to enjoy the patronage of Fyodor Sergeyev (known as "Comrade Artem"), a Bolshevik leader who had previously spent time in Australia and was a member of the Executive Committee of the Communist International (ECCI). Freeman arrived back in Australia in late 1920, using the alias "Miller" to avoid detection.

On arrival, Freeman found that the newly established Communist Party of Australia had splintered into two factions: one associated with the former Australian Socialist Party and another "Trades Hall" faction led by William Earsman and Jock Garden. Both groups sought recognition from the ECCI as the official communist party in Australia. Freeman favoured his former colleagues in the ASP, of which Artem had also been a member, while the Trades Hall group enjoyed the support of the Russian consul-general Peter Simonov. His attempts to unite the feuding factions failed.

Freeman returned to Russia in June 1921, leading the Australian delegation to the 3rd World Congress of the Communist International and the Red International of Labor Unions. He was an unsuccessful candidate for election to the ECCI. Correspondence from Freeman and his Soviet contacts is held by the Russian State Archive of Socio-Political History (RGASPI).

=== Death ===
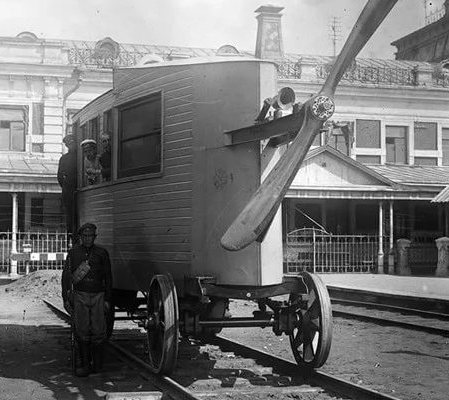
The Aerowagon

Freeman was killed on 24 July 1921 in the crash of the Aerowagon, Valerian Abakovsky's experimental propeller-driven railcar. He had been invited to a trial of the Aerowagon by his patron Artem, who was also killed in the crash. Freeman became one of the few Westerners interred at the Kremlin Wall Necropolis, the national cemetery of the Soviet Union.

His obituary in the IWW's Industrial Pioneer was written by Tom Barker, who eulogised him as "one of an army who were ejected from one continent to bestride other continents and leave behind them a fiery trail of work for their class".

== See also ==
- Enemy aliens in Queensland during World War I

== Sources ==
- Evans, Raymond (1989). "Radical Departures: Paul Freeman and Political Deportation from Australia Following World War One". Labour History (57). Liverpool University Press: 16–26. doi:10.2307/27508951. JSTOR 27508951.
- Windle, Kevin (2006). "A Troika of Agitators: Three Comintern Liaison Agents in Australia, 1920–22" (PDF). Australian Journal of Politics & History. 52 (1): 30–47. doi:10.1111/j.1467-8497.2006.00406a.x. hdl:1885/25391.
