= Aircraft registration =

Identification assigned to an individual aircraft

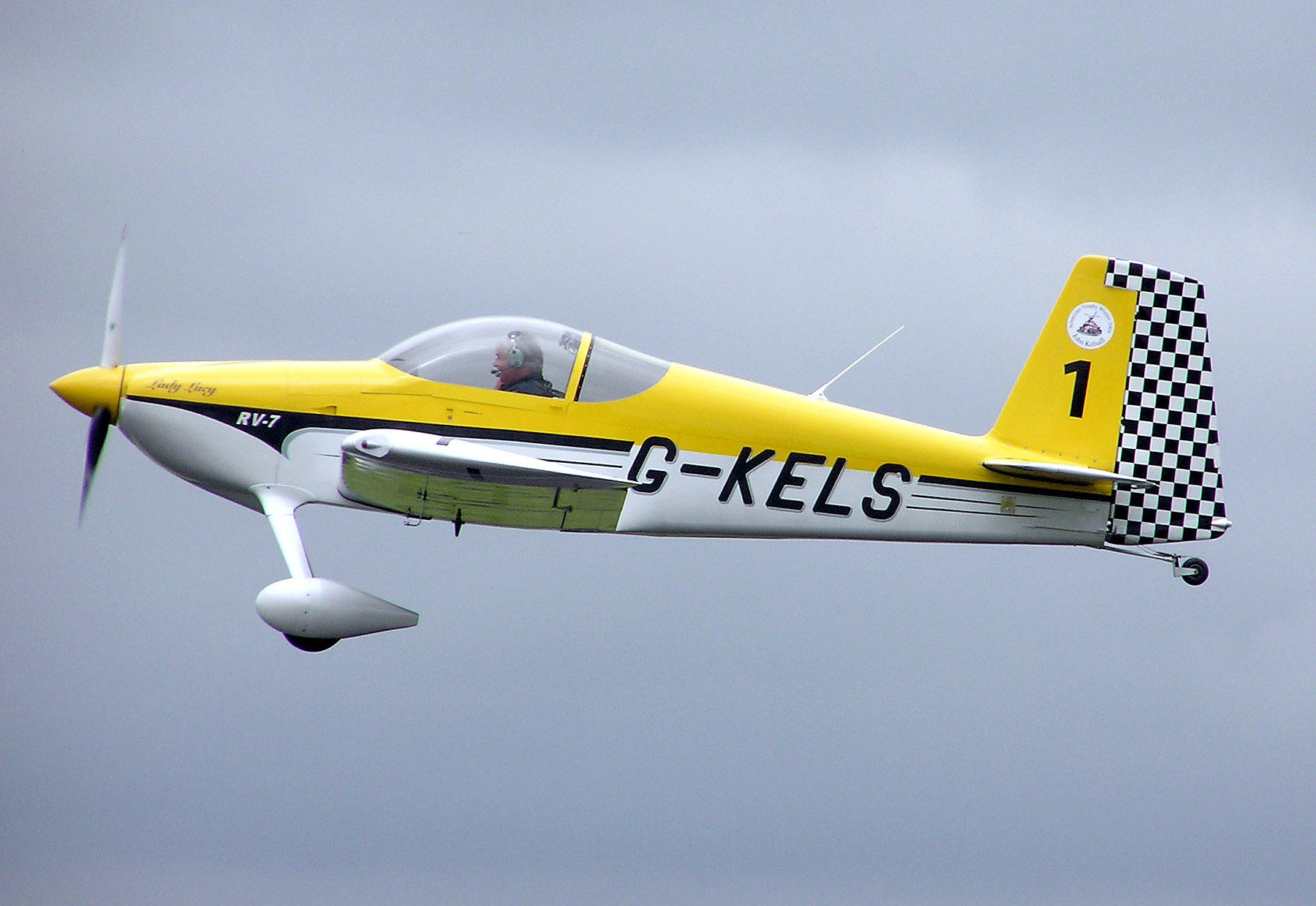
A Van's Aircraft RV-7 displaying registration G-KELS. The G prefix denotes a civil aircraft registered in the United Kingdom

Geographic map of registration prefixes

An aircraft registration is a code unique to a single aircraft, required by international convention to be marked on the exterior of every civil aircraft. The registration indicates the aircraft's country of registration, and functions much like an automobile license plate or a ship registration. This code must also appear in its Certificate of Registration, issued by the relevant civil aviation authority (CAA). An aircraft can only have one registration, in one jurisdiction, though it is changeable over the life of the aircraft.

== Legal provisions ==
In accordance with the Convention on International Civil Aviation (also known as the Chicago Convention), all civil aircraft must be registered with a civil aviation authority (CAA) using procedures set by each country. Every country, even those not party to the Chicago Convention, has a national aviation authority (NAA) whose functions include the registration of civil aircraft. An aircraft can only be registered once, in one jurisdiction, at a time. The NAA allocates a unique alphanumeric string to identify the aircraft, which also indicates the nationality (i.e., country of registration) of the aircraft, and provides a legal document called a Certificate of Registration, one of the documents which must be carried when the aircraft is in operation.

The registration identifier must be displayed prominently on the aircraft. Most countries also require the registration identifier to be imprinted on a permanent fireproof plate mounted on the fuselage in case of a post-fire/post-crash aircraft accident investigation.

Most nations' military aircraft typically use tail codes and serial numbers. Military aircraft most often are not assigned civil registration codes. However, government-owned non-military civil aircraft (for example, aircraft of the United States Department of Homeland Security) are assigned civil registrations.

Although each aircraft registration identifier is unique, some countries allow it to be re-used when the aircraft has been sold, destroyed or retired. For example, N3794N is assigned to a Mooney M20F. It had been previously assigned to a Beechcraft Bonanza (specifically, the aircraft in which Buddy Holly was killed). An individual aircraft may be assigned different registrations during its existence. This can be because the aircraft changes ownership, jurisdiction of registration, or in some cases for vanity reasons.

== Choice of aircraft registry ==
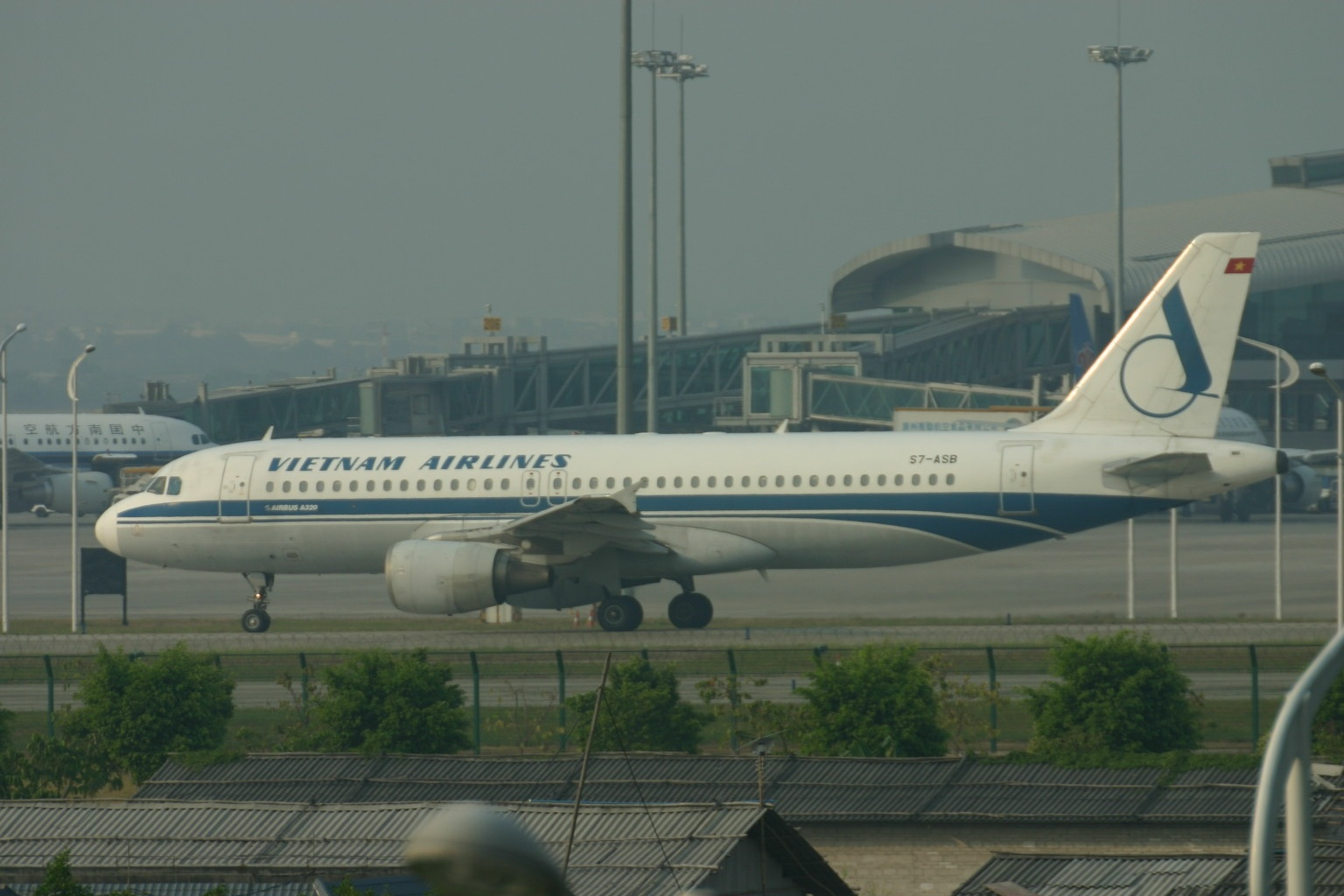
Shortly after the ending of US trade embargo, early Vietnam Airlines Western-supplied aircraft were registered in an overseas jurisdiction (such as Seychelles, as denoted by the S7 prefix) during the 1990s

Most often, aircraft are registered in the jurisdiction in which the carrier is resident or based, and may enjoy preferential rights or privileges as a flag carrier for international operations.

Carriers in emerging markets may be required to register aircraft in an offshore jurisdiction where they are leased or purchased but financed by banks in major onshore financial centres. The financing institution may be reluctant to allow the aircraft to be registered in the carrier's home country (either because it does not have sufficient regulation governing civil aviation, or because it feels the courts in that country would not cooperate fully if it needed to enforce any security interest over the aircraft), and the carrier is reluctant to have the aircraft registered in the financier's jurisdiction (often the United States or the United Kingdom) either because of personal or political reasons, or because they fear spurious lawsuits and potential arrest of the aircraft.

== International standards ==
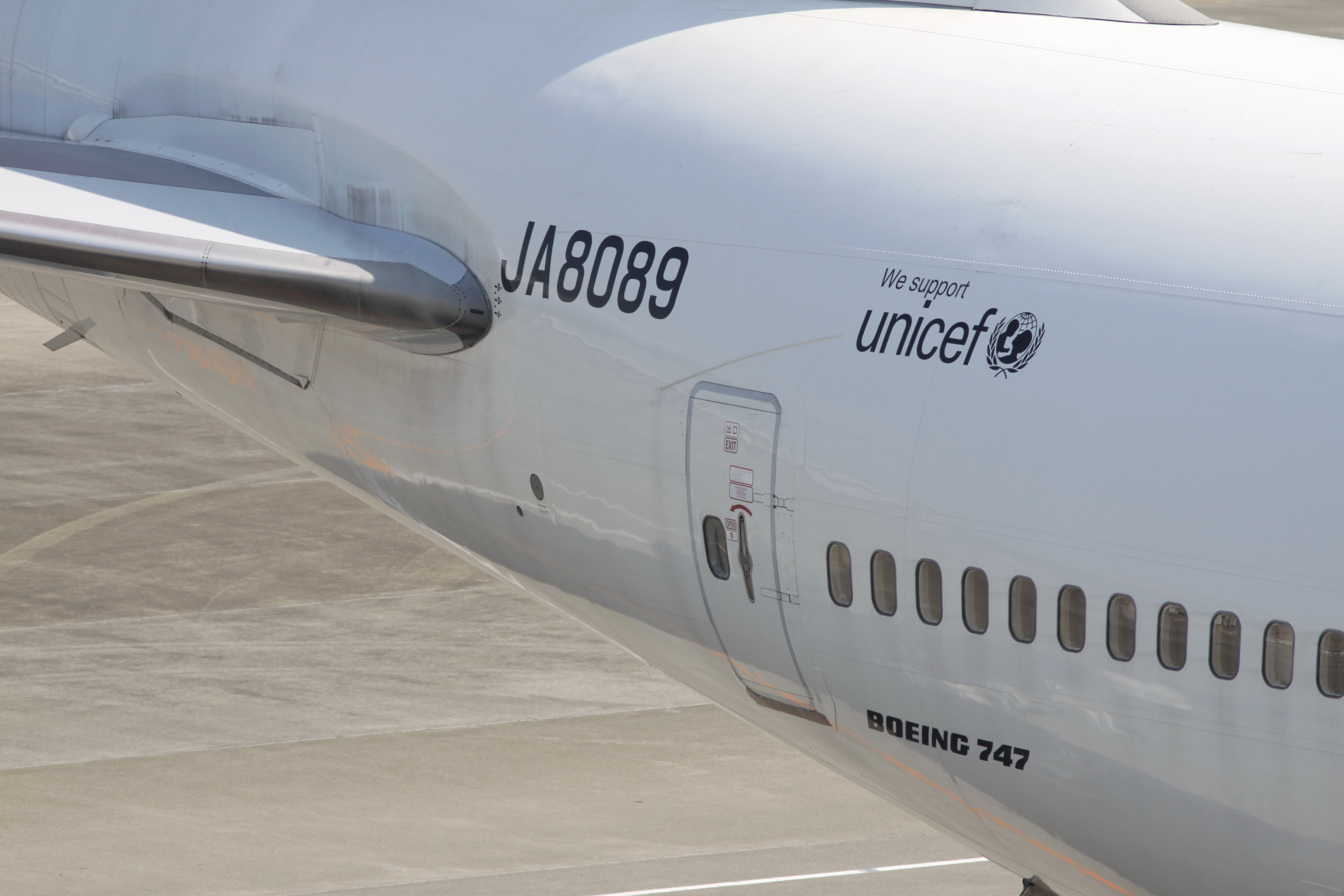
A Japan Airlines Boeing 747-400 displaying Japanese registration JA8089

The first use of aircraft registrations was based on the radio callsigns allocated at the London International Radiotelegraphic Conference in 1913. The format was a single letter prefix followed by four other letters (like A-BCDE). The major nations operating aircraft at that time were allocated a single letter prefix. Smaller countries had to share a single letter prefix, but were allocated exclusive use of the first letter of the suffix. This was modified by agreement by the International Bureau at Berne and published on April 23, 1913. Although initial allocations were not specifically for aircraft but for any radio user, the International Air Navigation Convention held in Paris in 1919 (Paris Convention of 1919) made allocations specifically for aircraft registrations, based on the 1913 callsign list. The agreement stipulated that the nationality marks were to be followed by a hyphen then a group of four letters that must include a vowel (and for the convention Y was considered to be a vowel). This system operated until the adoption of the revised system in 1928.

The International Radiotelegraph Convention at Washington in 1927 revised the list of markings. These were adopted from 1928 and are the basis of the currently used registrations. The markings have been amended and added to over the years, and the allocations and standards have since 1947 been managed by the International Civil Aviation Organization (ICAO).

Article 20 of the Convention on International Civil Aviation (Chicago Convention), signed in 1944, requires that all aircraft engaged in international air navigation bears its appropriate nationality and registration marks. Upon the completion of the necessary procedures, the aircraft receives its unique "registration", which must be displayed prominently on the aircraft.

Annex 7 to the Chicago Convention describes the definitions, location, and measurement of nationality and registration marks. The aircraft registration is made up of a prefix selected from the country's callsign prefix allocated by the International Telecommunication Union (ITU) (making the registration a quick way of determining the country of origin) and the registration suffix. Depending on the country of registration, this suffix is a numeric or alphanumeric code, and consists of one to five characters. A supplement to Annex 7 provides an updated list of approved nationality and common marks used by various countries.

== Country-specific usage ==
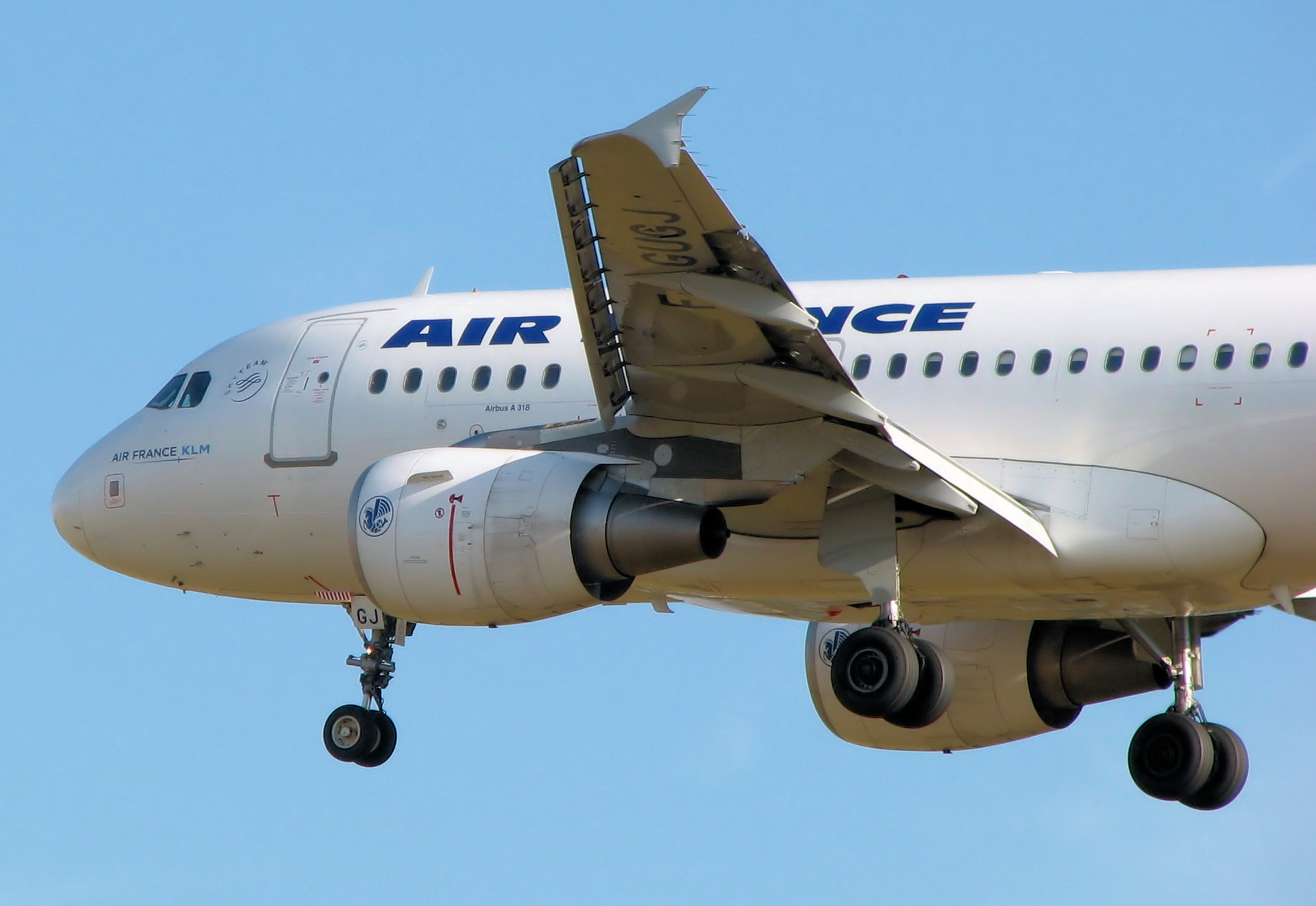
Air France Airbus A318 displaying registration F-GUGJ on the wing undersurface and the last two letters of the registration, GJ, on the nose wheel doors

While the Chicago convention sets out the country-specific prefixes used in registration marks, and makes provision for the ways they are used in international civil aviation and displayed on aircraft, individual countries also make further provision for their formats and the use of registration marks for intranational flight.

When painted on the aircraft's fuselage, the prefix and suffix are usually separated by a dash (for example, YR-BMA). When entered in a flight plan, the dash is omitted (for example, YRBMA). In some countries that use a number suffix rather than letters, like the United States (N), South Korea (HL), and Japan (JA), the prefix and suffix are connected without a dash. Aircraft flying privately usually use their registration as their radio callsign, but many aircraft flying in commercial operations (especially charter, cargo, and airlines) use the ICAO airline designator or a company callsign.

Some countries will permit an aircraft that will not be flown into the airspace of another country to display the registration with the country prefix omitted - for example, gliders registered in Australia commonly display only the three-letter unique mark, without the "VH-" national prefix.

Some countries also operate a separate registry system, or use a separate group of unique marks, for gliders, ultralights, and/or other less-common types of aircraft. For example, Germany and Switzerland both use lettered suffixes (in the form D-xxxx and HB-xxx respectively) for most forms of flight-craft but numbers (D-nnnn and HB-nnn) for unpowered gliders. Many other nations register gliders in subgroups beginning with the letter G, such as Norway with LN-Gxx and New Zealand with ZK-Gxx.

=== United States ===
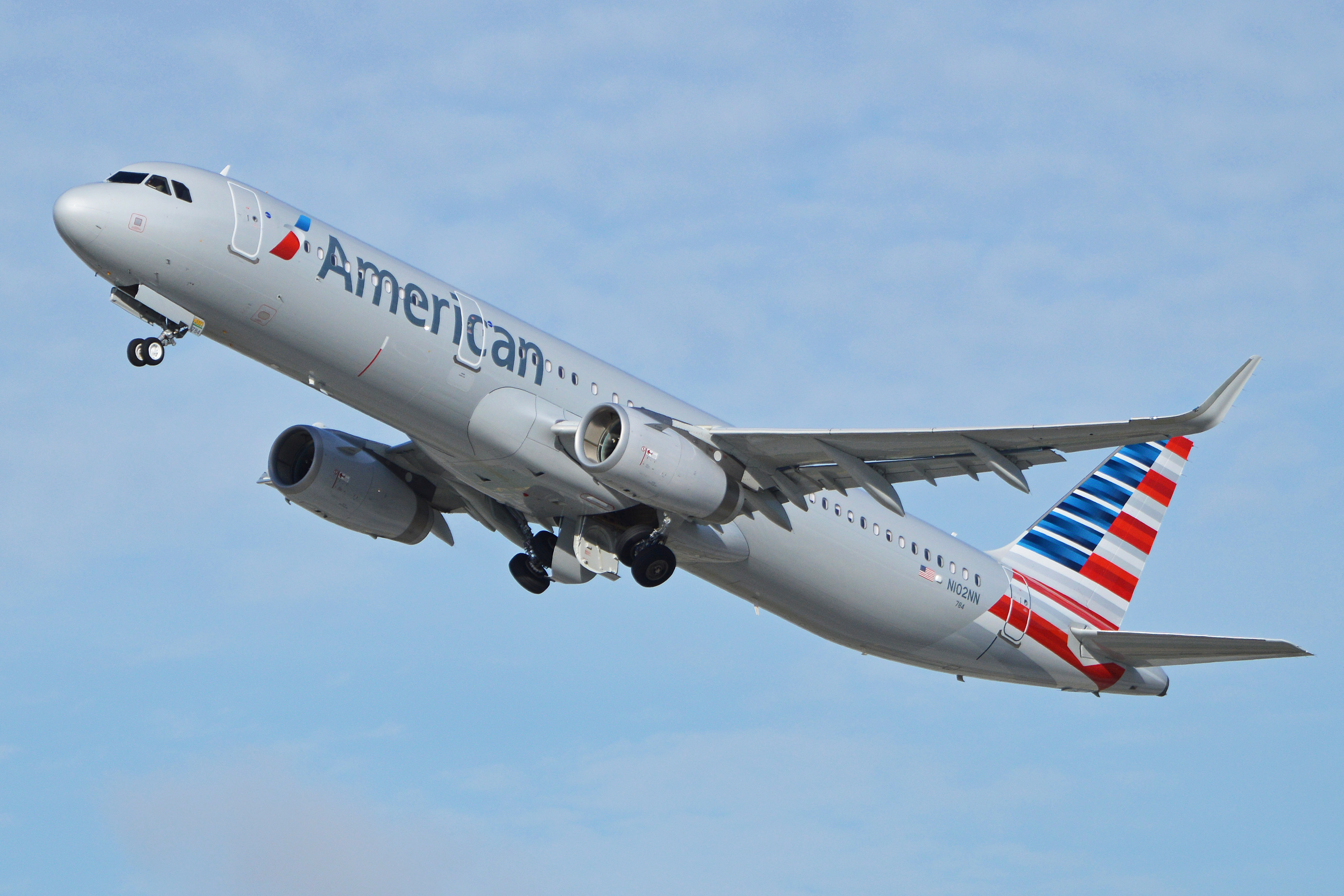
An American Airlines Airbus A321-231 displaying American registration N102NN on the rear fuselage

In the United States, the registration number is commonly referred to as an "N" number (a.k.a. FAA N-Number, because all aircraft registered there have a number starting with the letter N. An alphanumeric system is used because of the large numbers of aircraft registered in the United States. An N-number begins with a run of one or more numeric digits, may end with one or two alphabetic letters, may only consist of one to five characters in total, and must start with a digit other than zero. In addition, N-numbers may not contain the letters I or O, due to their similarities with the numerals 1 and 0.

Each alphabetic letter in the suffix can have one of 24 discrete values, while each numeric digit can be one of 10, except the first, which can take on only one of nine values. This yields a total of 915,399 possible registration numbers in the namespace, though certain combinations are reserved either for government use or for other special purposes.

The following are the combinations that could be used:

- N1 to N9: Federal Aviation Administration (FAA) internal use only
- N10 to N99: Federal Aviation Administration (FAA) internal use only
- N100 to N999
- N1000 to N9999
- N10000 to N99999
- N1A to N9Z
- N10A to N99Z
- N100A to N999Z
- N1000A to N9999Z
- N1AA to N9ZZ
- N10AA to N99ZZ
- N100AA to N999ZZ

An older aircraft (registered before 31 December 1948) may have a second letter in its identifier, identifying the category of aircraft. This additional letter is not actually part of the aircraft identification (e.g. NC12345 is the same registration as N12345). Aircraft category letters have not been included on any registration numbers issued since 1 January 1949, but they still appear on antique aircraft for authenticity purposes. The categories were:

- C = airline, commercial and private
- G = glider
- L = limited
- R = restricted (such as cropdusters and racing aircraft)
- S = state
- X = experimental

For example, N-X-211, the Ryan NYP aircraft flown by Charles Lindbergh as the Spirit of St. Louis was registered in the experimental category.

There is a unique overlap in the United States with aircraft having a single number followed by two letters and radio call signs issued by the Federal Communications Commission to Amateur Radio operators holding the Amateur Extra class license. For example, N4YZ is, on the one hand, a Cessna 206 registered to a private individual in Melba, Idaho, while, on the other hand, is also issued to an Amateur Radio operator in North Carolina. Since an aircraft registration number is also used as its call sign, this means that two unrelated radio stations can have the same call sign.

== Decolonisation and independence ==
The impact of decolonisation and independence on aircraft registration schemes has varied from place to place. Most countries, upon independence, have had a new allocation granted – in most cases this is from the new country's new ITU allocation, but neither is it uncommon for the new country to be allocated a subset of their former colonial power's allocation. For example, after partition in 1947, India retained the VT designation it had received as part of the British Empire's Vx series allocation, while Pakistan adopted the AP designation from the newly allocated ITU callsigns APA-ASZ.

When this happens it is usually the case that aircraft will be re-registered into the new series retaining as much of the suffix as is possible. For example, when in 1929 the British Dominions at the time established their own aircraft registers, marks were reallocated as follows:

- Canada: G-Cxxx to CF-xxx, then expanded to C-Fxxx, C-Gxxx, and then C-Ixxx in 1974.
- Australia: G-AUxx to VH-Uxx, then immediately expanded to all VH-xxx marks. As of 2022, the last three (3) characters will include numerals, e.g. VH-8AA.
- New Zealand: G-NZxx to ZK-Zxx, then immediately expanded to all ZK-xxx marks.
- Newfoundland: G-Cxxx (with Canada) to VO-xxx, then re-merged with the Canadian register in 1949 to CF-xxx.
- South Africa: G-UAxx to ZU-Axx, then expanded to all ZU-xxx marks, then again to current ZS-xxx, ZT-Rxx, and ZU-xxx allocations.

Two oddities created by this reallocation process are the current formats used by the Special Administrative Regions of the People's Republic of China, Hong Kong and Macau, both of which were transferred to PRC control from Britain in 1997 and Portugal in 1999 respectively. Hong Kong's prefix of VR-H and Macau's of CS-M, both subdivisions of their colonial powers' allocations, were replaced by China's B- prefix without the registration mark being extended, leaving aircraft from both SARs with registration marks of only four characters, as opposed to the norm of five.

== See also ==
- List of aircraft registration prefixes
- ITU prefix
- Flight number
- Belgian aircraft registration and serials
- Swiss military aircraft serials
- United Kingdom aircraft registration
- United Kingdom military aircraft registration mark
- United States military aircraft serials
- United States military tail code
- List of aircraft by tail number
