= Vincent de Groof =

Belgian aeronaut (1830–1874)

- Born: 6 December 1830; Rotterdam, United Kingdom of the Netherlands
- Died: 9 July 1874 (aged 43); London, United Kingdom
- Citizenship: Belgium
- Occupations: Aeronaut; shoemaker

Vincent de Groof (6 December 1830 – 9 July 1874) was a Dutch-Belgian early pioneering aeronaut. He created an early model of an ornithopter and successfully demonstrated its use before fatally crashing the machine in London.

== Biography ==
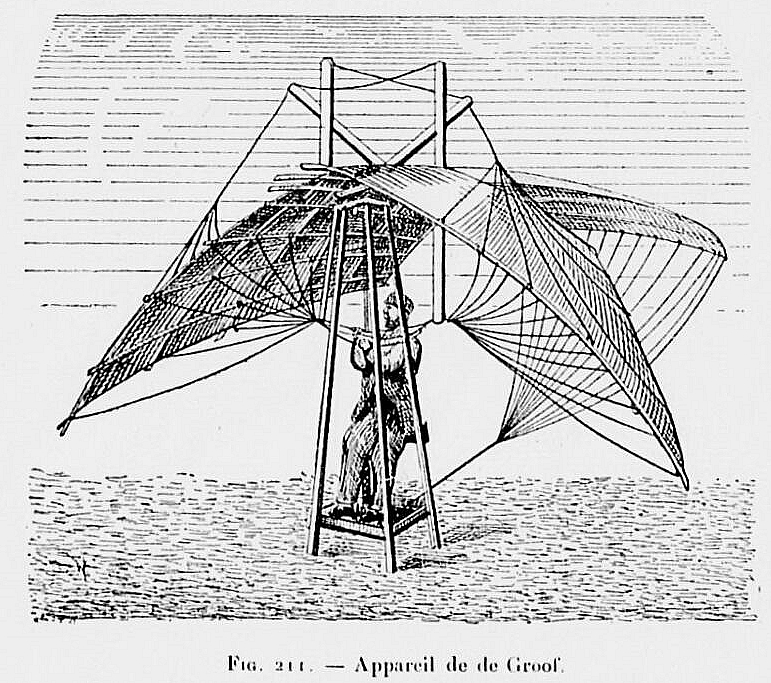
Vincent de Groof's gliding apparatus

Vincent de Groof was born in Rotterdam, Netherlands, on 6 December 1830. He was a shoemaker by trade. He created a flying machine based on the wing design of a bat, intended to function as a type of parachute.

The machine, weighing approximately 275 pounds (125 kg), was built out of a waterproof silk membrane stretched over a cane frame. It had a 37 feet (11 m) wingspan, with wings that had a breadth of 4 feet (1.2 m). The machine's tail was 18 feet (5.5 m) long by 3 feet (1 m) wide. De Groof stood upright in a wooden frame at the center of the machine, where he could control the craft using a set of three hand-operated levers.

His first experiment with this apparatus was performed in Bruges in 1862, and was successful. He moved to Paris in 1864, under the encouragement of Arwed Salives, the president of the committee for the examination of the encouragement for aviation.

In 1873, he made a failed attempt to land in the Grand-Place in Brussels, although he escaped uninjured.

Although his machine was not yet ready for public exhibition, he needed to perform public exhibitions to earn money. After being denied permission from authorities to conduct flying experiments in France and Belgium, he moved to London to use his apparatus. There, he partnered with the aeronaut Joseph Simmons, where on 29 June 1874, de Groof and Simmons ascended from Cremorne Gardens in Simmons's balloon, with de Groof's flying machine suspended beneath. The flying machine was dropped, with de Groof inside of it, from an altitude of between 300 feet (90 m) and 400 feet (120 m). De Groof successfully piloted the machine and made a safe landing in Epping Forest. Simmons cancelled a planned second attempt after de Groof's machine malfunctioned.

On 9 July 1874, de Groof was once again dropped from Simmons's balloon at an altitude of 300 feet (91 m), above Cremorne Gardens in London. The craft became overbalanced at about 80 feet (20 m) from the ground, falling forward and crashing into Robert Street, near St Luke's Church. Still breathing, but unconscious, he was brought to the hospital, where he was declared dead on arrival.

Following the incident, Simmons lost control of the balloon. He drifted eastward and eventually landed on the Great Eastern Railway line, where he nearly collided with an oncoming train.

== See also ==
- List of inventors killed by their own invention
