= M-497 Black Beetle =

Experimental jet-powered railcar

M-497
Type and origin
- Power type: Jet
- Build date: 1966
- Total produced: 1
Specifications
- Gauge: 1,435 mm (4 ft 8 1/2 in)
- Loco weight: 51.3 t (50.5 long tons; 56.5 short tons)
- Prime mover: General Electric J47-19
- Engine type: Turbojet
Performance figures
- Maximum speed: 183.85 mph (295.87 km/h)
Career
- Operators: New York Central Railroad
- Scrapped: 1984

The M-497 (nicknamed Black Beetle by the press) was an experimental jet-powered railcar test bed of the New York Central Railroad, developed and tested in 1966 in the United States. Two second-hand General Electric J47-19 jet engines, originally used as boosters for the Convair B-36 Peacemaker intercontinental bomber, were mounted atop an existing Budd Rail Diesel Car, an RDC-3 of coach and baggage-mail configuration which had received a streamlined front cowling. The construct was then sent on successful test runs over the existing tracks between Butler, Indiana, and Stryker, Ohio. The line had been chosen for its arrow-straight layout and good condition, but otherwise unmodified track. On July 23, 1966, the car reached a speed of 183.68 mph (295.6 km/h), an American rail speed record that stood until 1974 when the LIMRV went significantly faster.

== Design and development ==
The project was led by Don Wetzel, assistant Director of Technical Research for the NYC. The goal was to gather data on the stresses of high-speed travel on conventional tracks. The project was completed in just 30 days at the railroad's Collinwood Technical Center in Cleveland, with a budget of roughly $35,000. The base vehicle was an existing Budd Rail Diesel Car (RDC-3), number M-497, configured for coach and baggage/mail service. Two General Electric J47-19 jet engines, originally used as boosters for the Convair B-36 Peacemaker bomber, were purchased as military surplus for $5,000 and mounted atop the forward end of the car. To improve aerodynamics, a streamlined front cowling was fabricated. The nose design was created by Wetzel's wife, Ruth, a commercial artist, who reportedly based the design on "what looked good", believing that aerodynamic efficiency would follow aesthetic form. The engines were mounted at a five-degree nose-down angle to generate downforce, ensuring the 112,000-pound car remained firmly on the tracks at high speeds.

== Record run ==
The test runs were conducted over existing tracks between Butler, Indiana, and Stryker, Ohio. The line had been chosen for its arrow-straight layout and good condition but was otherwise unmodified track. On July 23, 1966, the car reached a speed of 183.68 mph (295.6km/h), Wetzel claimed that during the run, the speedometer actually peaked at 196 mph (315 km/h) before he decelerated. This established an American rail speed record that stood until 1974 when the LIMRV went significantly faster.

== Legacy ==
Even with this performance, and though it had been built relatively cheaply using existing parts, the project was not considered viable commercially. The railroad gathered valuable test data regarding the stresses of high-speed rail travel on conventional equipment and tracks then existing in America. The data were largely ignored, as the NYC was headed for a merger with its arch-rival Pennsylvania Railroad that was already heavily involved in the Metroliner project, funded by the United States Department of Transportation.

M-497 continued to serve for Penn Central after the jet engines were removed until retirement by Conrail in 1977. The car was eventually scrapped in 1984.

The engines were re-used as X29493, an experimental snow blower constructed to clear rail yards. While effective at melting snow and ice, the sheer thrust of the J47 engines tended to dislodge the ballast (gravel) and blow it away along with the snow, leading to the machine's eventual retirement.

== See also ==
- Turbojet train
- LIMRV
