= Ellis V. Eichman =

American aircraft designer

- Eichman working on an Aerobat I Flying Wing
- Born: July 15, 1913; Goliad, Texas, United States
- Died: July 18, 1997 (aged 84); Brownsville, Texas, United States
- Other name: Ike
- Occupations: U.S. Army Air Corps, Pan Am metalsmith, aircraft designer and builder
- Years active: 1932–1997
- Known for: Founder of Aerobat Aircraft Company, builder of Eichman Aerobat I, IA, II and III

Ellis V. "Ike" Eichman (July 15, 1913 – July 21, 1997) was a United States Army Air Corps aviation mechanic and Pan Am metalsmith. He is best known for founding the Aerobat Aircraft Company and designing the Eichman Aerobat series of flying wing aircraft.

== Early life ==
Eichman was born to his father, Julius O. Eichman, and mother, Lorine Eichman. They lived on a farm near Goliad, Texas where his father was a tenant farmer. Eichman started school in 1920 when he was 7.

In 1928, in the middle of the great depression, his family moved to San Antonio, Texas, where his father worked for the Works Progress Administration.

== Career ==
In 1933, Eichman had been working in a law firm while studying law for four years. He was now 19 years old, and it was here that he first got the idea for a new type of airplane. Eichman decided office work was not his liking, so with the help of Captain James A. Healey, a WWI Ace, he joined the Army Air Corps. He started at the 40th Training Attack Squadron at Kelly Field (later known as Kelly Air Force Base), then was sent to Chanute Field, Rantoul, Illinois, for aircraft and engine mechanic training. While training at Chanute, he met a German professor who had come to America after WWI and was fascinated by Eichman's flying-wing concept. The professor told him that Germany had been thinking about wing design at the war's end.

This photo was publish in the book, The Wing Flew in 1942.

In 1936, Pan American Airways was hiring men for metal fabrication work in Brownsville, Texas. Eichman paid $73.64 to buy out his military service and immediately got a ride to the Pan American Metal Shop, where he worked on Ford Trimotor, DC-2s, DC-3s, and Boeing 247-Ds. He became the airline's metalsmith.

In 1937, Eichman met Willia Belle "Billie" Haynes, a divorcee with one son who worked at a local cafe. After their marriage, he adopted her son, Bill. Sometime later, Eichman would send correspondence to the National Advisory Committee for Aeronautics at Langley Field. They helped Eichman with technical data on comparative wing sections, control, and other information to advance his flying-wing design. His wife, Willia, helped him build the first Flying Wing, known as the Aerobat I airplane. They worked together in a garage.

In 1938, Eichman started a sub-assembly business, and his first subcontract was for the government, making parts for the Sperry Company for bomb sights. These parts would be shipped to APO ports in New York and San Francisco. He also made parts for B-24 Liberators and some material for the School of Aviation Medicine at Randolph Field. The workload got hectic, and Eichman had to quit Pan American and hire 20 helpers.

== World War II ==
Flying Wing heavy payload designed by Ellis V. Eichman for Ford Motor Company

15 June 1940, with concerns about the war in Europe, Eichman wrote to the Honorable Morris Sheppard, United States Senator of Texas, Chairman of the Committee on Military Affairs, to see if the government would adopt his flying wing design into a formidable fighter plane or make it into a larger-scale bomber aircraft. In its current configuration, it was a small, light, two-place, all-metal, 40 H.P. aircraft. He explained that a preliminary study showed that with more powerful engines, speeds could reach beyond 500 miles per hour.

Between June 21 and November 9, 1940, Eichman exchanged 15 letters with the United States Senate Committee on Military Affairs and Henry L. Stimson, the United States Secretary of War in Washington, D.C.. They consisted of correspondence over schematic drawings and blueprints, form applications, newspaper clippings, payment negotiations, and an eventual rejection from the department. Eichman continued to offer to construct and demonstrate his design for the committee with promising offers to finance the project, but his plan never came to fruition.

August 1942, Eichman called Mr. Henry Ford of the Ford Motor Company and told him about his newly built wing airplane design. Eichman was invited to Detroit for an interview and met with Henry Ford Sr., Charles Lindbergh, LTC Jimmy Doolittle, Edsel Ford, Charles Sorensen, and Henry Ford II. After the interview, it was decided to build a 4-engine model for a 100,000 ib. gross airplane and test it in the wind tunnel at the University of Michigan.

On 9 September 1943, Eichman files a patent for the Eichman Aerobat. 8 August 1944, the United States Patent Office issues patent number US-D138469-S for Eichman's Aerobat.

== After WWII ==
Ellis V. Eichman first Aerobat Patent 8 August 1944

On 14 June 1948, Eichman was operating his Aerobat Aircraft Company at 1421 Hayes Street in Brownsville, Texas, and sent his airplane blueprints to the newly formed United States Air Force's Air Mobility Command. Colonel George F. Smith returned his plans and stated that the AMC already has several projects for similarly designed aircraft under development and that no further action will be taken.

On 3 May 1949, the US Patent Office issued patent number US-D153590-S to Eichman for a jet-powered version of the Aerobat.

On 26 March 1954, the charter was granted to Aerobat Sales, Inc., in Brownsville, Texas. A 50-year charter for merchandise with corporators Ellis V. Eichman, Ellis V. Albaugh, and C. B. Jones.

10 August 1954, Eichman would be granted his first patent in connection with his newly formed Window and Door company. In total, Eichman would have five patents granted up until 13 March 1973.

14 March 1984, Eichman sues a Michigan company for $17 million dollars for allegedly violating his patent involving a glass wall panel for framed structures.

Ellis V. Eichman jet powered Flying Wing design patented giving on 1949-05-03

22 November 1988, Eichman lost a case in the U.S. Court of Appeals for the Federal Circuit.

In 1996, a biography was written about Eichman by Major Allen E. Snyder, USAF (Ret.), titled The Wing Flew in 1942 - Ike's Flying Wing.

=== Aerobat I ===
Mr. Eichman is examining the wooden propeller of Aerobat I in Brownsville, Texas.

Ellis V. Eichman's first started building his Flying Wing in 1938 and completed it by January 1942. The registration FAA N-Number NX17638 was assigned to the aircraft. All of the work was done in his Brownsville, Texas, garage with the help of his wife, Willia Belle (Billie) Haynes. Ironically, Eichman was so involved with the War Effort via working with Pan American and spending his spare time building his plane that he never learned how to fly. Less Mauldin was the first to fly the Aerobat I. Less taxied out on a cow pasture for a short run and came back to Eichman and stated he will try a takeoff. Less barely made it over a fence and made a hard landing, but the Aerobat was not damaged. The Aerobat was underpowered. This first wing was equipped with a 40 H.P. Lycoming engine. It has a 45-gallon gas tank, and the plane was estimated to burn three gallons an hour at 120 M.P.H. cruise. An estimated 15 hours of flying time. Aerobar I had a long half open, half closed embedded canopy, but reverted to the two shield-type windscreens as seen in the photo above.

=== Aerobat IA ===
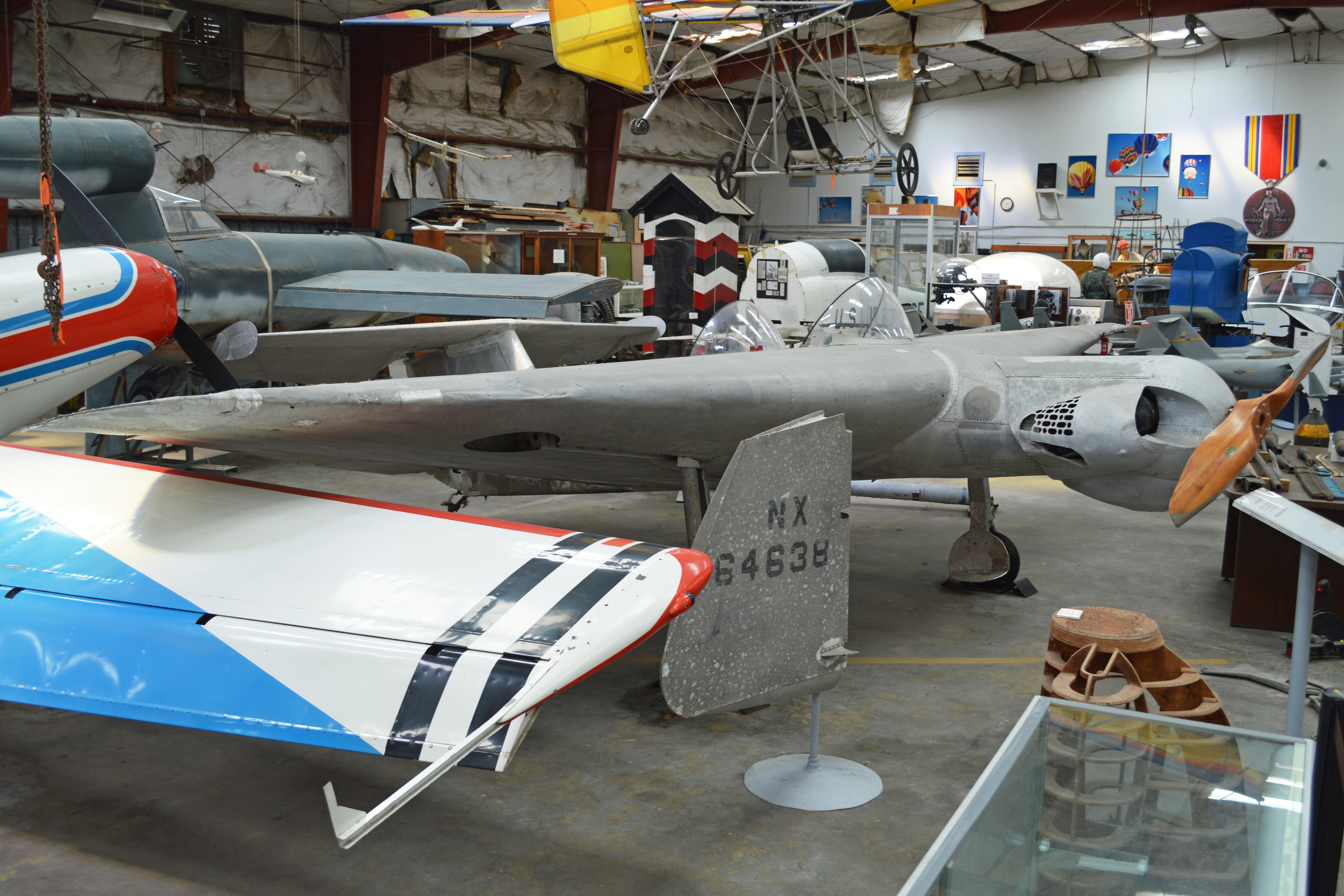
Aerobat IA on display at the Texas Air Museum Stinson Chapter

The Aerobat IA is an upgrade of the Aerobat I. Eichman first added a 50-horsepower Continental engine, and then an even more powerful Lycoming 75 H.P. engine. Eichman had taken Less Mauldin's advice and was now looking for someone to fly it again. In a Brownsville cafe, he met a Pan-American pilot named Wm. Baxter. The next day, Baxter, with fellow Chief Inspector "Stinky" Davis, arrived at a place called Jack-Ass Flats, east of Brownsville. After a short flight, Baxter returned to the ground, adjusted the weight and balance by adding a 40-lb sandbag, and took off to Brownsville's airport for a successful long flight. Over the next few weeks, Eichman and Baxter continued with more test flights, and, based on Baxter's recommendations, retractable landing gear was added. First, a hand crank was used to raise and lower the gears, then it was upgraded to an electric motor. This information comes from an article in the Valley Morning Star published 22 July,1945. Aerobat IA is the only surviving airplane built by Eichman and is on display at Texas Air Museum - Stinson Chapter.

=== Aerobat II ===
The Aerobat II was built in 1950 with its assigned FAA N-Number NX64638. It was a two-place side-by-side flying wing with a 125 H.P. Menasa 4-cylinder, inverted aircraft engine. Eichman had installed a larger 175 H.P. engine but only did ground runs on it. Eichman was offered a job in Dallas but was unable to take the new wing with him. So he left Aerobat II in the care of the Brownsville airport. He would visit the airport to check on the wing but could not work on it. After about two years working in Dallas, he returned to the airport and found that Aerobat II was stolen. The airport office said that one morning the fence was down and the aircraft was gone. The only component remaining was the vertical stabilizer/rudder.

=== Aerobat III ===
Aerobat III was a completely new design with its engine mounted in the back of the aircraft, known as a Pusher Aircraft. Aerobat III has the Federal Aviation Administration FAA N-Number N17638. This is similar to Aerobat I's NX17638. The Allen E. Snyder book cover is the only known photo of the intact Aerobat III before its fatal crash. The details leading up to the crash are given in the NTSB report referenced here. What remained of Aerobat III after the accident is not known.

== Death ==
On July 20, 1997, Eichman died during the maiden test flight of Aerobat III in Brownsville, Texas. He was 84 years old.
