= Valerian Abakovsky =

Soviet inventor (1895–1921)

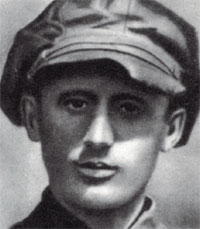
- Born: 5 October 1895; Riga, Governorate of Livonia, Russian Empire (now Latvia)
- Died: 24 July 1921 (aged 25); Serpukhov, Russian SFSR
- Resting place: Kremlin Wall Necropolis, Moscow
- Occupations: Inventor, chauffeur
- Known for: Aerowagon

Valerian Ivanovich Abakovsky (Russian: Валериа́н Ива́нович Абако́вский, Latvian: Valerians Abakovskis; 5 October 1895 – 24 July 1921) was a Soviet engineer who is best remembered as the inventor of the Aerowagon.

== Early life ==
He was born in Riga on October 5, 1895, in to a Russian family. Although a talented inventor, he worked as a chauffeur for the Tambov Cheka.

== The Aerowagon ==
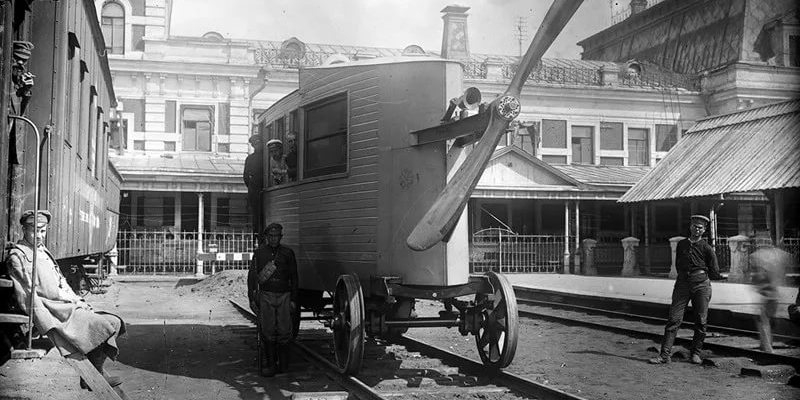
Abakovsky's Aerowagon

The invention for which Abakovsky is remembered is the Aerowagon, an experimental high-speed railcar fitted with an aeroplane engine and propeller propulsion. It was originally intended to carry Soviet officials.

== Death ==
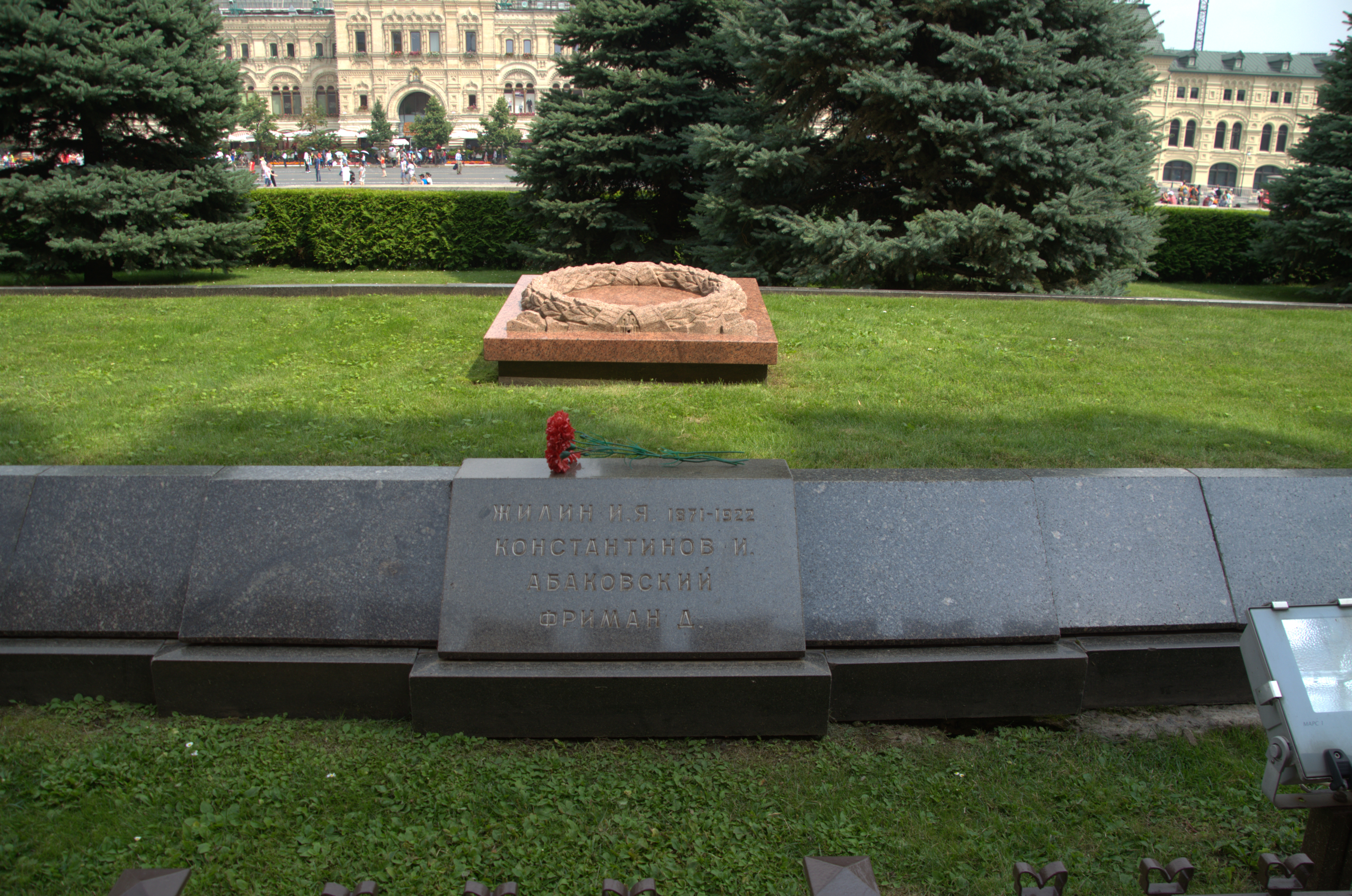
Red Square Mass Grave No. 13, inscriptions for Ivan Zhilin, Ivan Konstantinov, Valerian Abakovsky and Paul Freeman

On 24 July 1921, a group of communists led by Soviet politician Fyodor Sergeyev took the Aerowagon from Moscow to the Tula collieries to test it. Abakovsky was also on board. Although they successfully arrived in Tula, on the return route to Moscow, the Aerowagon derailed at high speed, killing 7 of the 22 on board. The following people died in the accident:

- Ivan Konstantinov, a Bulgarian delegate
- Paul Freeman, an Australian delegate
- Oskar Hellbrück, a German delegate
- John William Hewlett, a British delegate
- Fyodor Sergeyev (known as "Comrade Artyom")
- Otto Strupat, a German delegate
- Valerian Abakovsky himself, at the age of 25.

The seven men killed in the crash lay in state at the House of the Unions, after which they were buried in the Kremlin Wall Necropolis. Sergeyev is buried in Mass Grave No. 12, Konstantinov, Abakovsky and Freeman are buried in Mass Grave No. 13, while Strupat, Helbrich and Hewlett are buried in Mass Grave No. 14.
