= Turbojet train =

Train powered by turbojet engines

SVL turbojet railcar

A turbojet train is a train powered by turbojet engines. Like a jet aircraft, but unlike a gas turbine locomotive, the train is propelled by the jet thrust of the engines, rather than by its wheels. Only a handful of jet-powered trains have been built, for experimental research in high-speed rail.

Turbojet engines have been built with the engine incorporated into a railcar combining both propulsion and passenger accommodation rather than as separate locomotives hauling passenger coaches.

As turbojet engines are most efficient at high speeds, (Note: Their efficiency increases as vehicle speed increases to the speed of the exhaust jet, although this is considerably more than railway speeds.) the experimental research has focused in applications for high-speed passenger services, rather than the heavier trains (with more frequent stops) used for freight services.

== M-497 ==
The first attempt to use turbojet engines on a railroad was made in 1966 by the New York Central Railroad (NYCR), a company with operations throughout the Great Lakes region. They streamlined a Budd Rail Diesel Car, added two General Electric J47-19 jet engines, and nicknamed it the M-497 Black Beetle. Testing was performed on a 25 mi (40 km) length of the normal NYCR system – a virtually arrow-straight layout of regular existing track between Butler, Indiana, and Stryker, Ohio.

On July 23, 1966, the train reached a speed of 184 miles per hour (296 km/h).

== LIMRV ==
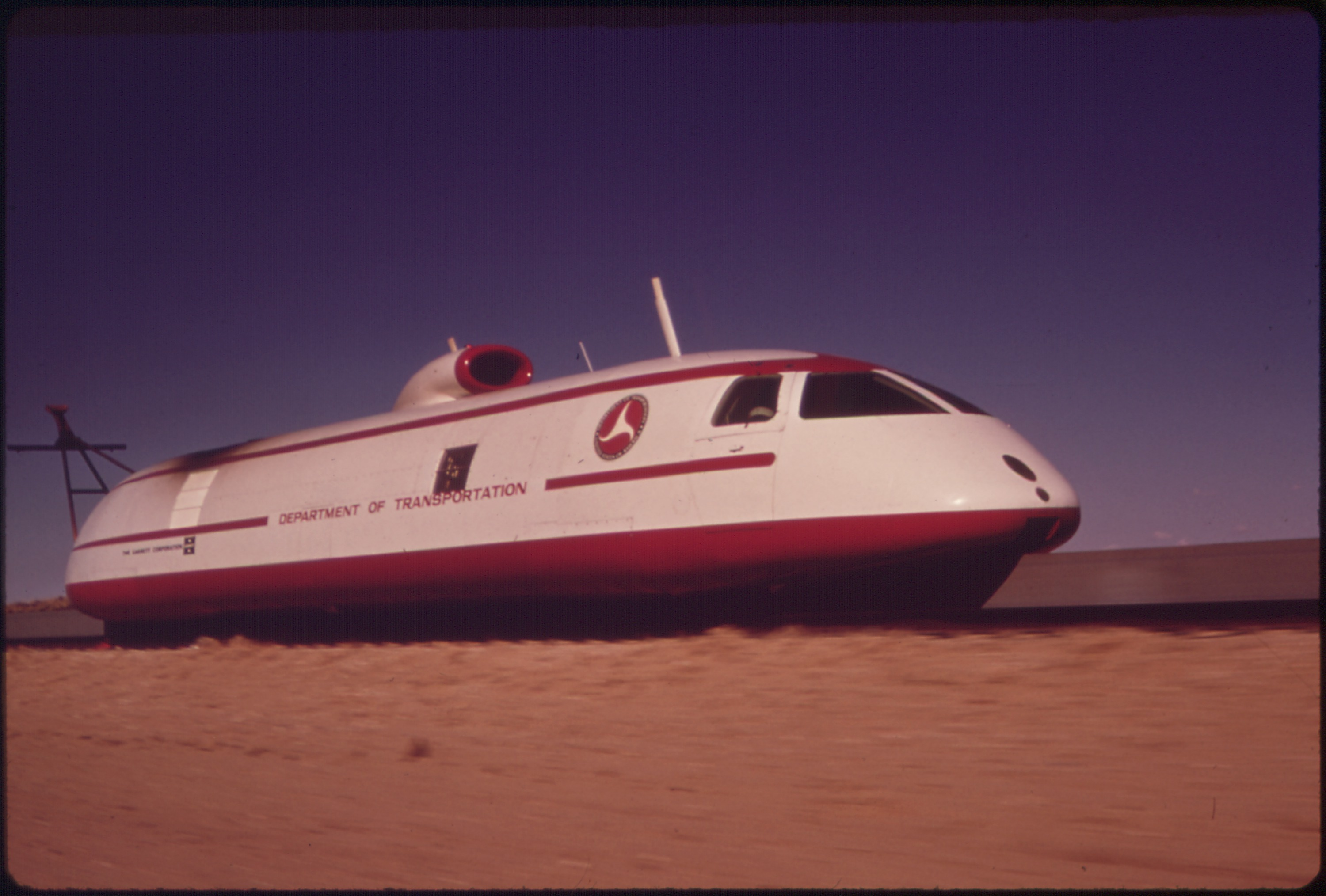
LIMRV before J52 jet engines were added

In the early 1970s, the U.S. Federal Railroad Administration developed the Linear Induction Motor Research Vehicle (LIMRV), meant to test the use of linear induction motors. The LIMRV was a specialized wheeled vehicle, running on standard-gauge railroad track. Speed was limited due to the 6.4 mi (10.3 km) length of the track and vehicle acceleration rates.

One stage of research saw the addition of two Pratt & Whitney J52 jet engines to propel the LIMRV. Once the LIMRV had accelerated to desired velocity, the engines were throttled back so that the thrust equaled their drag. On 14 August 1974, using the jet engines, the LIMRV achieved a world record speed of 255.7 mph (411.5 km/h) for vehicles on conventional rail.

== SVL ==
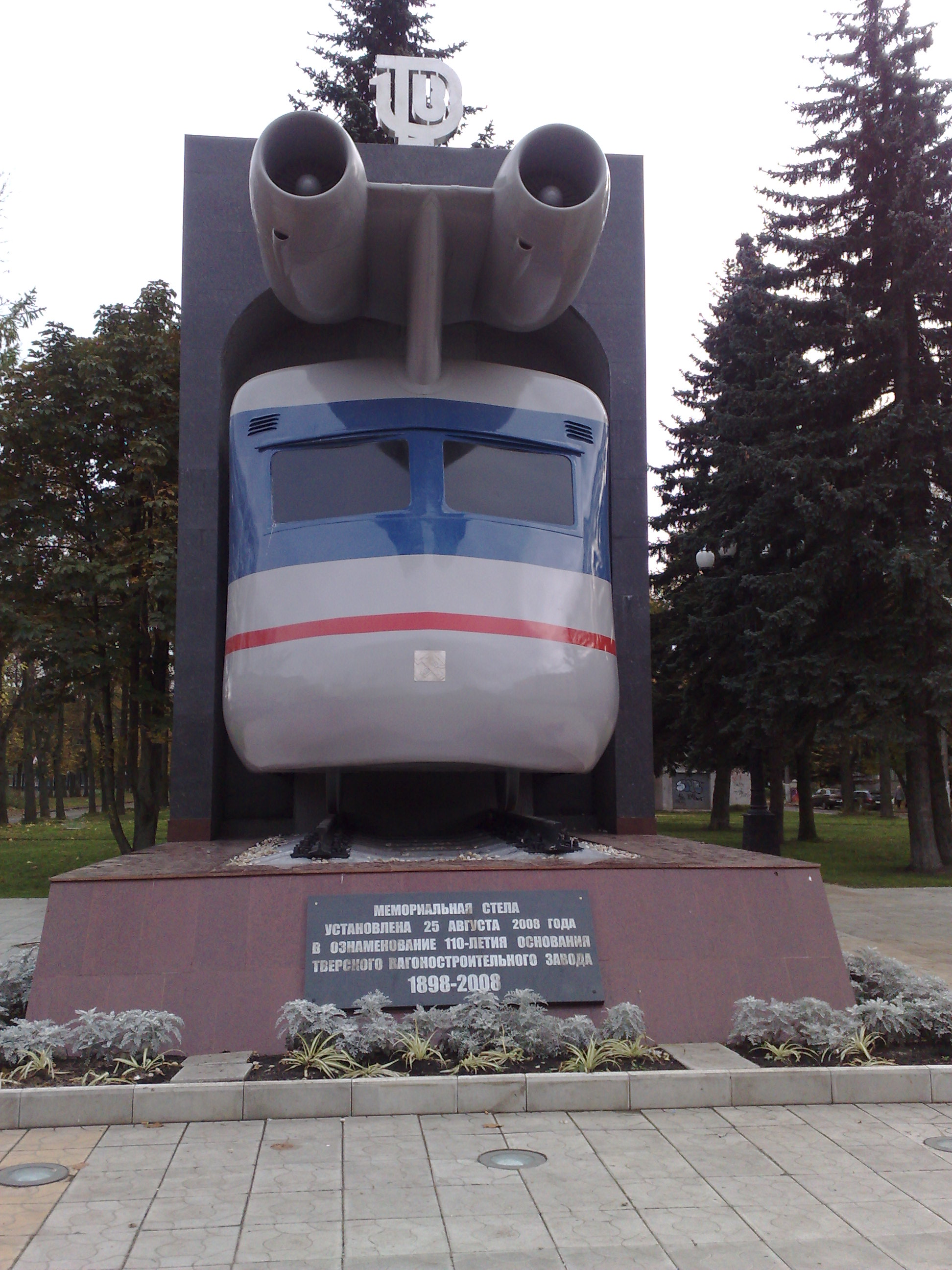
Monument at the rail-car factory in Tver depicting a Turbojet train

In 1970, researchers in the USSR developed the High-speed Laboratory Railcar (SVL) turbojet train. The SVL was able to reach a speed of 250 kilometres per hour (160 mph). The researchers placed jet engines on an ER22 railcar, normally part of an electric-powered multiple unit train. The SVL had a mass of 54.4 tonnes (including 7.4 tonnes of fuel) and was 28 metres (92 ft) long. If the research had been successful, there was a plan to use the turbojet powered vehicle to pull a "Russian troika" express service. As of 2014, the train still exists in a dilapidated and unmaintained state, while the research project has been honoured with a monument made from the front of the railcar, outside a railcar factory in Tver, a city in western Russia.

== See also ==
- Aérotrain – a contemporary French hovercraft train, also powered by a jet engine
- Aerowagon
- Schienenzeppelin – a German propeller-driven railcar of 1929
- Turboshaft
