= FAA N-Number =

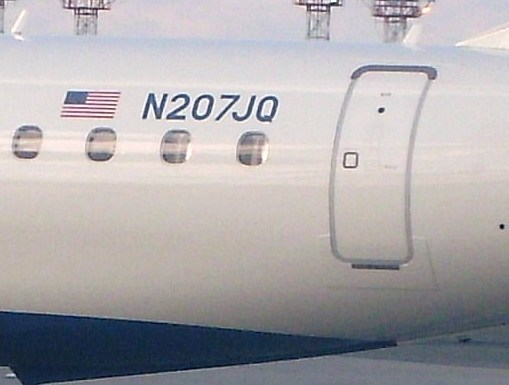
Embraer 175 with N207JQ number

The FAA N-Number is an aircraft registration code used in the United States.

Every civil aircraft registered in the United States begins with the letter "N." This designation was assigned internationally to the U.S. by the International Civil Aviation Organization (ICAO). The use of "N" not only helps to identify the aircraft as being registered in the U.S. but also establishes a standard for differentiating U.S. aircraft from those of other countries.

When you see an aircraft registration number formatted as N12345, you immediately recognize its U.S. origin. This system plays a crucial role in aviation safety and regulation, as it allows authorities to track and manage aircraft effectively. Understanding this designation is essential for anyone involved in aviation, whether as a pilot, owner, or aviation enthusiast.

An FAA N-Number is a unique serial number used to identify and track civil aircraft registered in the United States.

How N-Numbers Work

The "N" Prefix

Every U.S. civil aircraft registration starts with the letter N, which was assigned internationally to the United States.

Character Limits

Following the "N", the registration can include up to 5 additional characters (letters and numbers).

No Confusion

The letters I and O are never used because they look too much like the numbers 1 and 0.

Starting Rule

An N-number cannot start with a zero; the first digit after the "N" must be 1 through 9.

Common Formats:

1 to 5 numbers: Example: N12345

1 to 4 numbers followed by 1 letter: Example: N1234Z

1 to 3 numbers followed by 2 letters: Example: N123AB

Legacy Airworthiness Suffixes

Older historical categories that used specific letters after the "N" (like NC for standard, NX for experimental, or NR for restricted) are no longer issued by the FAA for new registrations.
