= João Torto =

Legendary Portuguese inventor

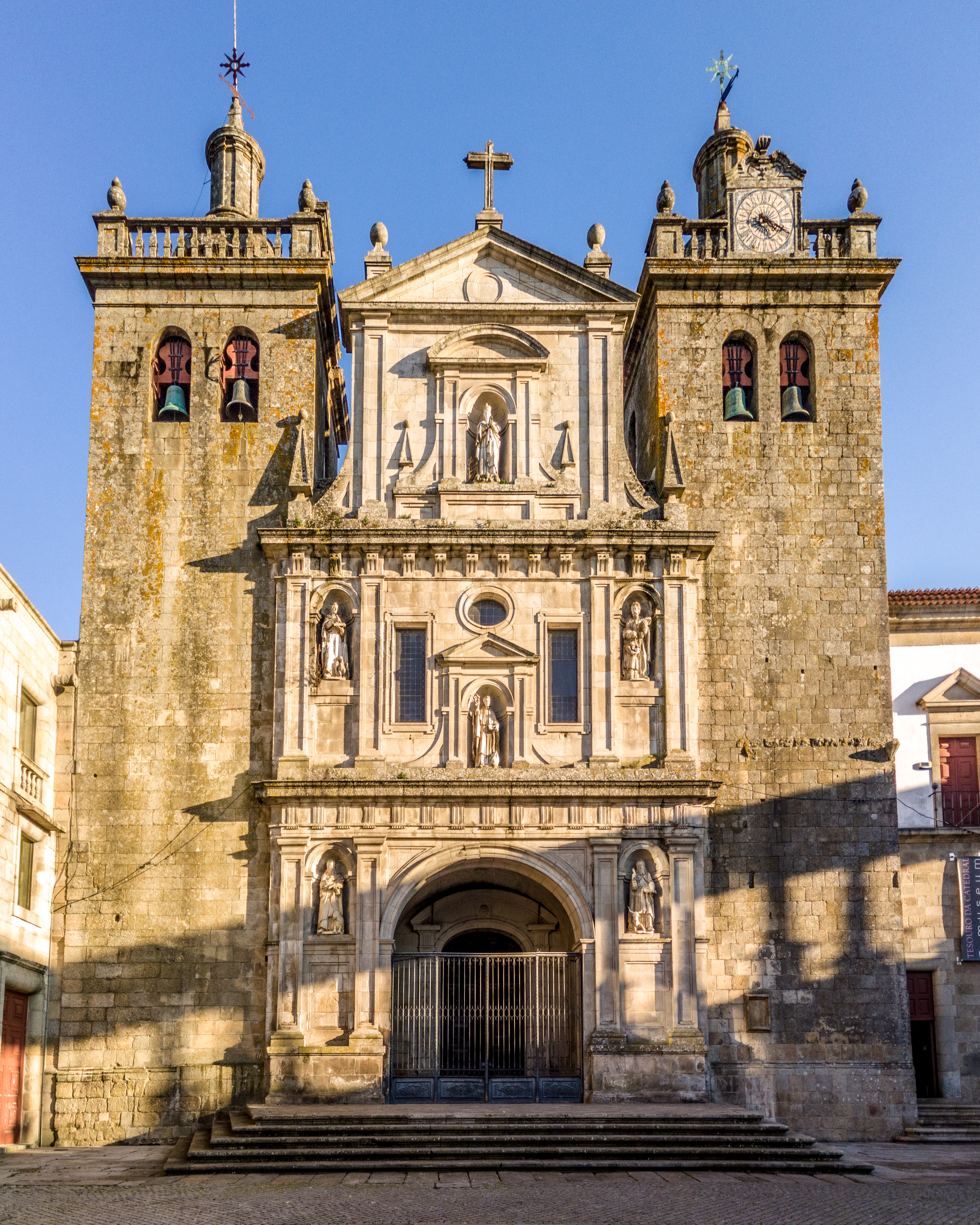
Viseu Cathedral

João de Almeida Torto was a Portuguese man, probably a legendary figure, who purportedly made an unsuccessful attempt at flight, jumping from the top of Viseu Cathedral with the aid of a self-designed flying apparatus on 20 June 1540. The traditional retelling of the legend refers to João Torto as the "protomartyr of aviation" or "the modern Icarus".

== The legend ==
In June 1540, Torto, who worked as a nurse, barber surgeon, astrologer and schoolmaster, had a crier proclaim his intent to fly: "Know all ye, inhabitants of this city, that this month shall not end before you will see the wonder of wonders, a man who will fly with wings of cloth from the tower of the Cathedral to the Field of São Mateus — for whose person and holdings responds João de Almeida Torto".

Reportedly, João Torto's design was a biplane of two pairs of wings, the bottom wing smaller than the top one, comprising a structure of wooden spars with ribs were covered in calico cloth. The top and bottom wings were connected by three metal hoops through which he inserted his arms, one ring at the shoulder, one at the elbow and the last held in his hand. The wings were secured to his torso by a leather strap across his chest; across his back, the wing spars met at a pair of hinged joints that enabled him to flap at will or, if held steady, to glide on outstretched arms. To facilitate the landing, he wore boots with triple soles. Finally, as a tribute to the birds from which he had drawn inspiration, he devised an eagle-shaped helmet complete with a beak.

Torto's wife feared he had gone mad, and ensured that the local tribune (juiz do povo) forced him to draw up a last will and testament so that she could inherit his lands and holdings, as they were childless (otherwise, the properties would be given to Torto's brothers). Resigned to watch the upcoming tragedy, she elected to stand at the doorway of a nearby chapel on the appointed day (anachronistically referred to as the Chapel of Our Lady of the Remedies, which was not yet built at the time).

A large crowd assembled in the Cathedral square at dawn on 20 June 1540, as João Torto used a rope and pulley to get the apparatus to the top of the tower and then proceeded to suit up. At 5 am exactly, he jumped from the roof of the Cathedral and immediately started to glide forward and downward; soon after, however, one of the wings malfunctioned and his bird helmet slipped covering his eyes, sending him into a curving plummet onto the roof of the nearby Chapel of São Luis, on which he briefly managed to land before slipping to the ground below. With a dislocated shoulder and a missing shoe, he was unconscious and only came to about 2 hours past, and succumbed to his injuries a couple of days later.

All information on the incident was published in local newspaper Comércio de Viseu in 1922 and, later, in O Século in 1927, reportedly drawing from unpublished ancient documents in the private collection of Fr. Henrique Cid, parish priest of Santos Evos in the late 19th century, whose writings have been criticised by historians as fanciful fabrications; in the 1960s, local historian and archeologist Alexandre de Lucena e Vale referred to his papers as "literary trifles", with no precise or inequivocal mention of sources, and no mention of similar tales in contemporary authors.
