= William Nelson (inventor) =

American inventor (d. 1903)

William Nelson (1878/9 – October 3, 1903) was an American inventor and an employee of General Electric in Schenectady, New York. He created a motorized bicycle and was killed after he fell off of it.

On the afternoon of October 3, 1903, in New York state, Nelson tested a new motorized bicycle he had invented. While trying out the motor bicycle on a hill opposite the home of his father-in-law, William H. Sterling, Nelson fell from the machine and was instantly killed at the age of 24.
