= Eichman Aerobat =

American experimental aircraft

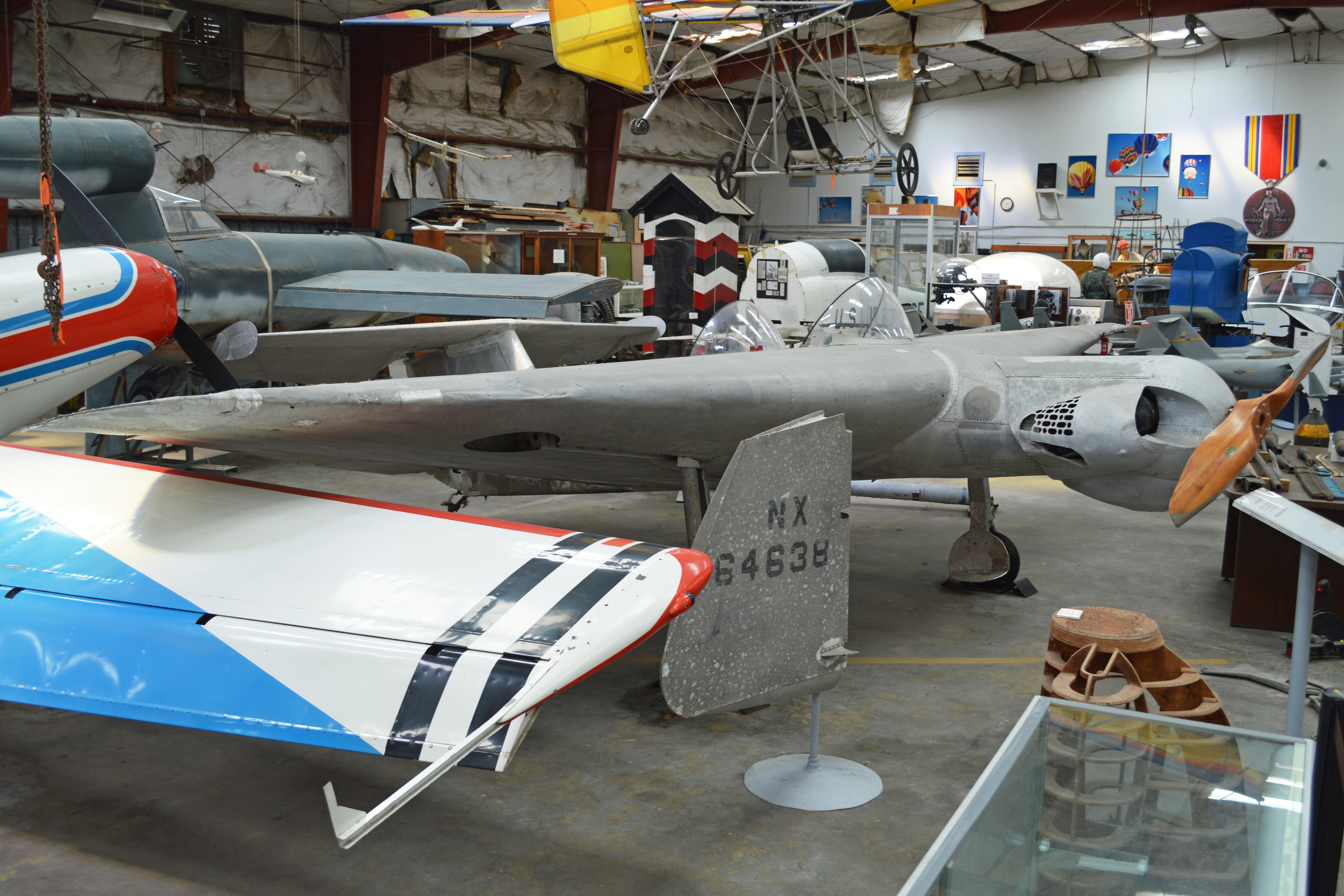
- A United States Experimental Aircraft

General information
- Type: Reverse-Delta Flying Wing
- National origin: United States
- Manufacturer: Mr. Ellis V. Eichman
- Designer: Mr. Ellis V. Eichman 1937
- Status: On museum static display
- Primary user: Private Pilot
- Number built: 4

History
- Manufactured: 1937–1986
- First flight: 1942

The Eichman Aerobat is an American piston-engined, civilian-designed delta wing aeroplane. Four variations were built.

== Design and development ==
This delta wing concept was originally developed by Ellis V. "Ike" Eichman as a reverse-delta flying wing airplane. Eichman built four delta-winged aircraft.

Aerobat I, c. 1937, was powered by a 50 hp Continental engine and had fixed landing gear. It flew in 1942. Its span was 24'0" and it was 17'0" in length. The FAA registration number was NX17638.

Aerobat IA was the rebuilt Aerobat I. This version was made into a tail-dragger with widely spaced retractable landing gear that folded outward into the bottom of the wing. Most of the aircraft has a reverse-delta wing planform, but the forward fuselage houses the engine, which extends in front of the wing. It has two bubble canopies and a small lower window for the pilot to see the ground. There was a single vertical tail with the stabilizer mounted at the top, and small teardrop-shaped tip plates on the tips of the stabilizer. This rebuild also flew in 1942.

Aerobat II was flown in 1950 and had side-by-side seating. Aerobat II also retained the original FAA registration number.

Aerobat III, a.k.a. "Aerobat B", a total redesign of the original. Aerobat III had a tail-mounted pusher engine and was believed to have FAA number NX64638. However, photographs show N17638

== Accidents ==
On 20 July 1997, Eichmann died in the maiden flight of Aerobat III when oscillation caused elevator failure, and the aircraft crashed on takeoff at Brownsville, Texas. He was 82 years old.

== Aircraft on display ==
Aerobat IA is on display at the Texas Air Museum - Stinson Chapter.
