= Foreign relations of Russia =

The Declaration of the Twelve (Belgium, Denmark, France, Germany, Greece, Ireland, Italy, Luxembourg, Portugal, Spain, the Netherlands and the United Kingdom) on the future status of Russia and other former Soviet Republics was published on 23 December 1991, according to which "The European Community and its Member States have noted with satisfaction the decision of the participants at the Alma Ata meeting on 21 December 1991 to establish a Commonwealth of Independent States. They note that the international rights and obligations of the former USSR, including those arising from the Charter of the United Nations, will continue to be exercised by Russia. They note with satisfaction the acceptance by the Russian Government of these commitments and responsibilities and will continue to deal with Russia on this basis, taking into account the change in its constitutional status."

The foreign relations of the Russian Federation is the policy arm of the government of Russia which guides its interactions with other nations, their citizens, and foreign organizations. This article covers the foreign policy of the Russian Federation since the dissolution of the Soviet Union in late 1991.

Kremlin's foreign policy debates show a conflict among three rival schools: Atlanticists, seeking a closer relationship with the United States and the Western World in general; Imperialists, seeking a recovery of the semi-hegemonic status lost during the previous decade; and Neo-Slavophiles, promoting the isolation of Russia within its own cultural sphere. While Atlanticism was the dominant ideology during the first years of the new Russian Federation, under Andrei Kozyrev, it came under attack for its failure to defend Russian pre-eminence in the former USSR. The promotion of Yevgeny Primakov to Minister of Foreign Affairs in 1996 marked the beginning of a more nationalistic approach to foreign policy.

Another major trend has been Eurasianism, a school of thought that emerged during the early 20th century. Eurasianists assert that Russia is composed of Slavic, Turkic and Asiatic cultures and equates Liberalism with Eurocentric imperialism. One of the earliest ideologues of Eurasianism was the Russian historian Nikolai Trubetzkoy, who denounced the Europhilic Czar Peter I and advocated Russian embrace of the Asiatic "legacy of Chinggis Khan" to establish a trans-continental Eurasian state. Following the collapse of Soviet Union, Eurasianism gained public ascendency through the writings of philosopher Aleksandr Dugin and has become the official ideological policy under the government of Vladimir Putin. (Note: Sources:)

Vladimir Putin held the presidency from January 2000 to May 2008, and again from May 2012 to the present. Under Putin, Russia has engaged in several notable conflicts, including against the neighboring country of Ukraine. He recognized the independence of Donetsk and Luhansk within that country. Relations with the United States in particular have sharply deteriorated between 2001 and 2022, with the Kremlin blaming US involvement in the Middle East and countries bordering Russia. Relations with the European Union became hostile after Russia's 2014 annexation of Crimea from Ukraine.

On 24 February 2022, Russia invaded Ukraine, prompting the imposition of substantial economic and political sanctions by the western bloc, led by the EU, UK & USA. The Russian government now has a specified "Unfriendly Countries List" which indicates countries with which relations are now strained (or non-existent). At present, Russia has no diplomatic relations with Ukraine (since 2022) due to the ongoing Russo-Ukrainian war. Russia also has no diplomatic relations with Georgia (since 2008), Bhutan, the Federated States of Micronesia (since 2022) and the Solomon Islands.

Since the start of the Russo-Ukrainian war, Russian relations with the western camp (the United States & its allies) have significantly deteriorated. Russia's relations with the European Union, Japan, USA, Canada, UK & Australia have been the most impacted since 2014. In recent years, formerly strong relations with Armenia, Montenegro, Azerbaijan, South Korea, Israel, Bulgaria & Moldova have worsened. On the other hand, Russia still maintains strong friendly relations with nations from the Global South, especially those from Asia & Africa. Russia tends to have strong ties with countries that stand against US-led positions, although India, Kazakhstan, Brazil & Vietnam are major exceptions.

Key Russian allies/partners include Belarus, China, India, Mongolia, DPRK, Kazakhstan, Eritrea, Kyrgyzstan, Iran, Vietnam, Burkina Faso, Tajikistan, Brazil, Myanmar, Cuba, Mali, Burundi, Sudan, Niger & Nicaragua. The Houthis in Yemen also have strong ties with the Russian Federation. Other nations such as Egypt, Syria, Serbia, Uzbekistan, Bahrain, Turkey, Iraq, Kuwait, Honduras, Turkmenistan, Laos & Algeria also hold friendly relations with Russia. Russia has also maintained some positive relations with the Second Trump administration.

== History ==
=== Foreign policy of the Russian Federation ===
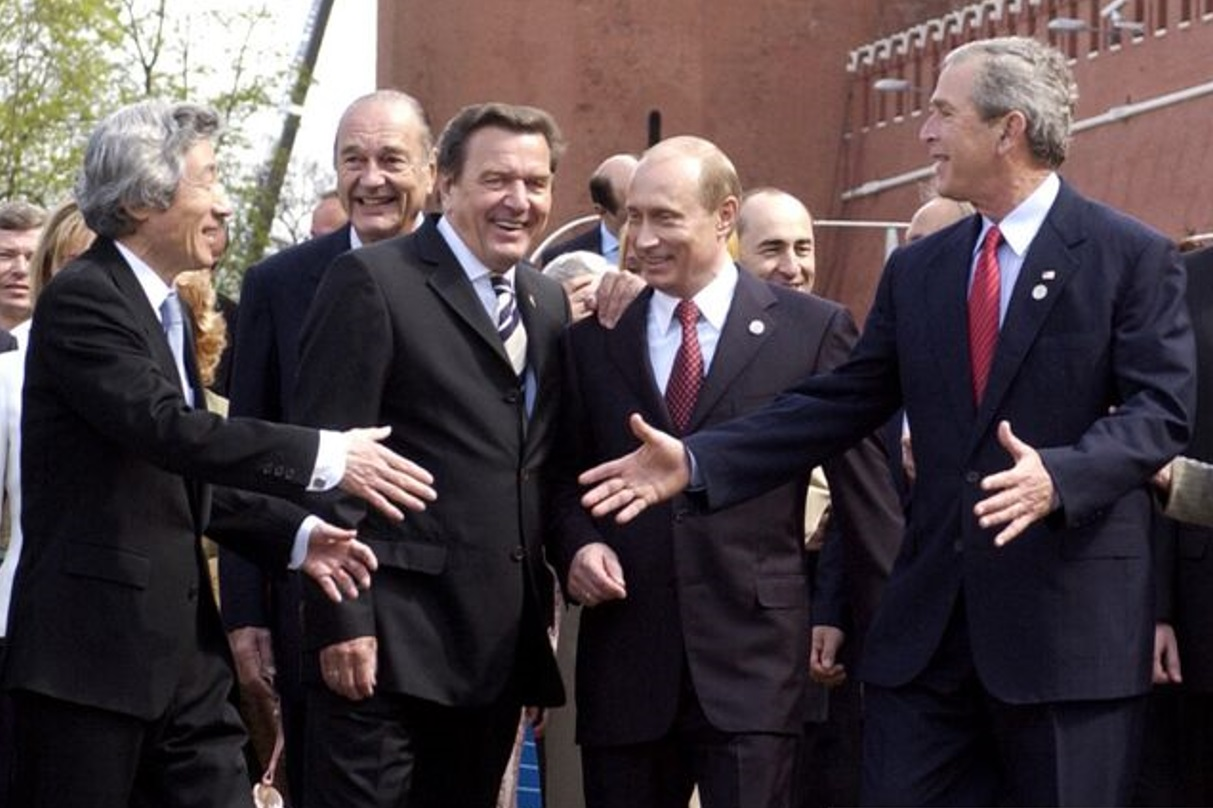
Putin with George W. Bush, Gerhard Schröder, Jacques Chirac and Junichiro Koizumi during the Victory Day Parade in Moscow, on 9 May 2005

In international affairs, Putin had made increasingly critical public statements regarding the foreign policy of the United States and other Western countries. In February 2007, at the annual Munich Conference on Security Policy, he criticized what he called the US monopolistic dominance in global relations and claimed that the US displayed an "almost unconstrained hyper use of force in international relations." He said the result of it is that "no one feels safe! Because no one can feel that international law is like a stone wall that will protect them. Of course such a policy stimulates an arms race."

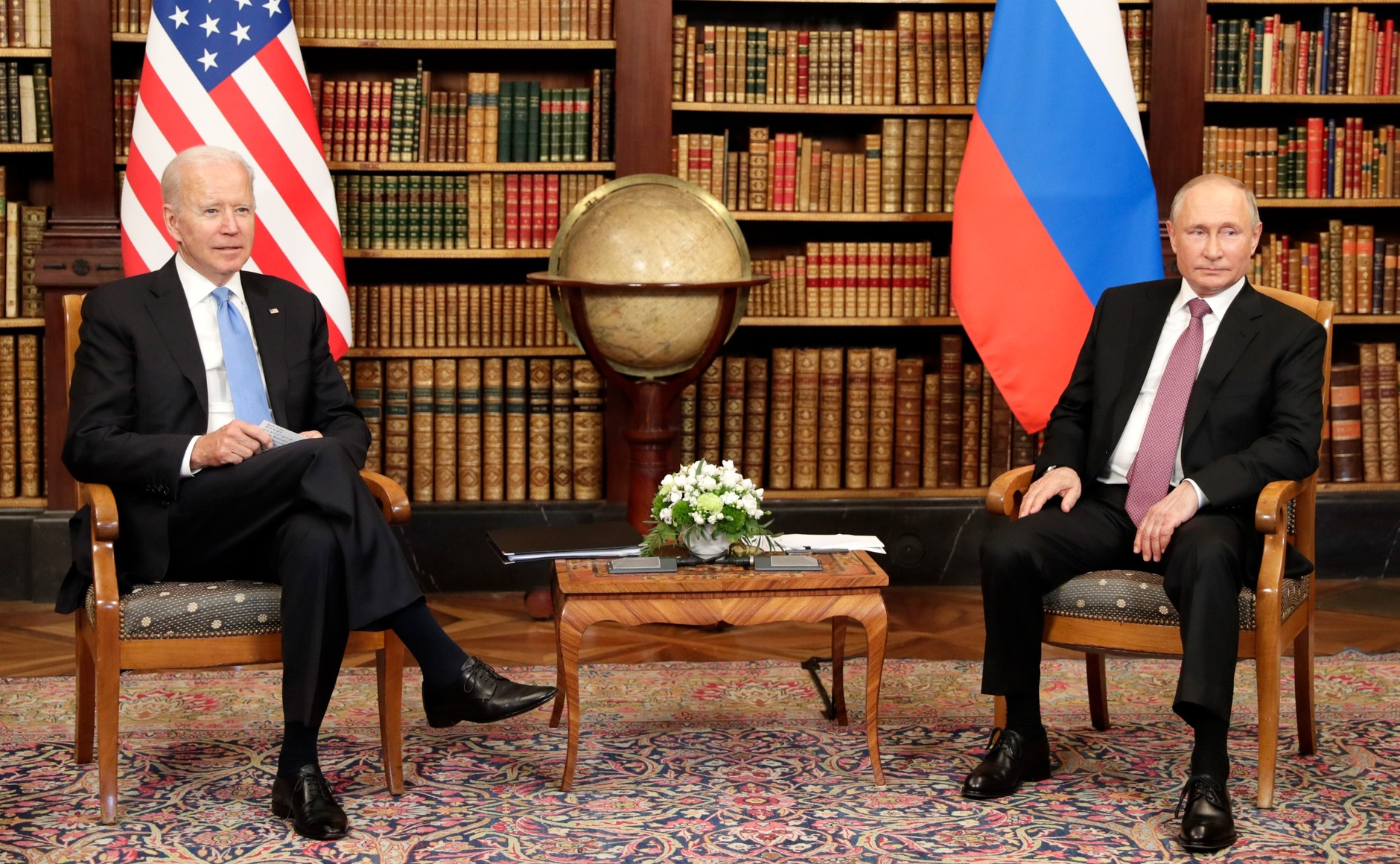
Vladimir Putin meeting with American president Joe Biden, 2021.

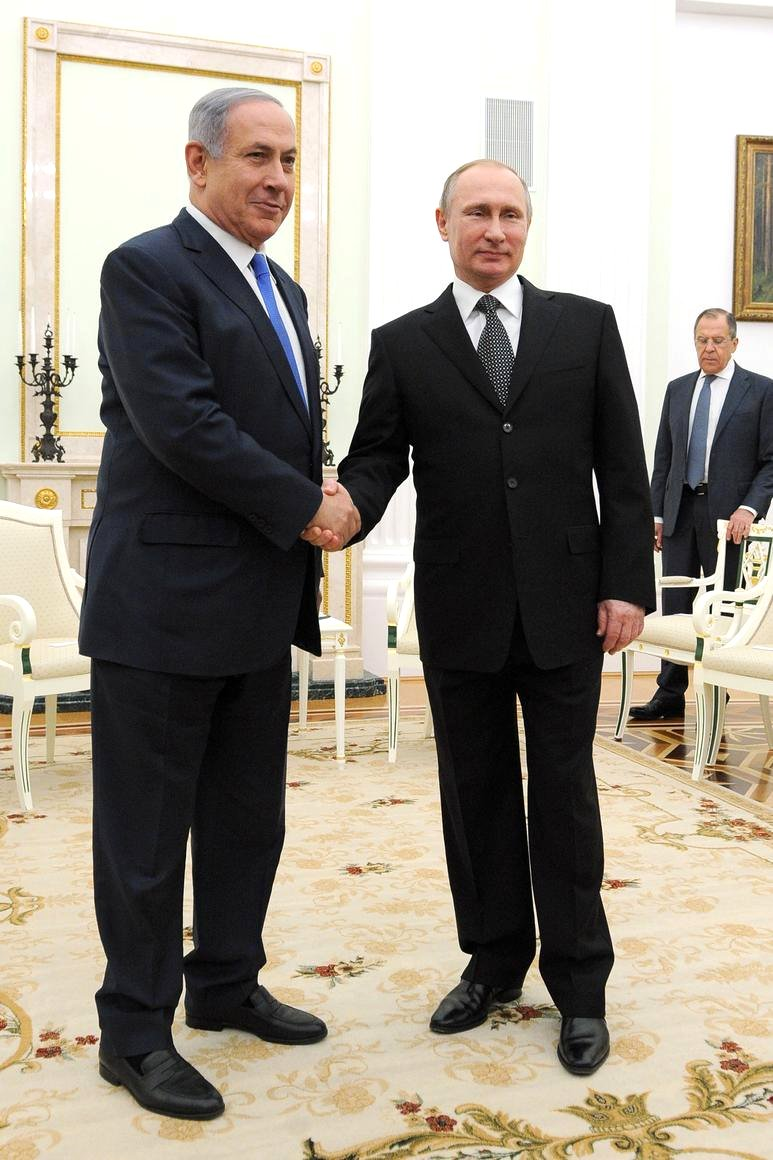
Meeting with Israeli prime minister Benjamin Netanyahu, 2016

Putin proposed initiatives such as establishing international centers for the enrichment of uranium and prevention of deploying weapons in outer space. In a January 2007 interview, Putin stated that Russia is in favor of a democratic multipolar world and of strengthening the system of international law.

==== 2000–2006 ====
Putin is often characterized as an autocrat by the Western media and politicians. His relationship with former US President George W. Bush, former and current Brazilian President Luiz Inácio Lula da Silva, former Venezuelan President Hugo Chávez, former German Chancellor Gerhard Schröder, former French President Jacques Chirac, and former Italian Prime Minister Silvio Berlusconi are reported to be personally friendly. Putin's relationship with Germany's former Chancellor, Angela Merkel, is reported to be "cooler" and "more business-like" than his partnership with Gerhard Schröder, who accepted a job with a Russian-led consortium after leaving office.

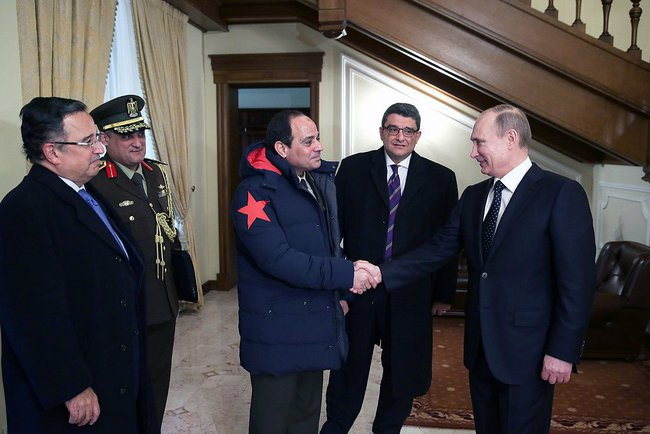
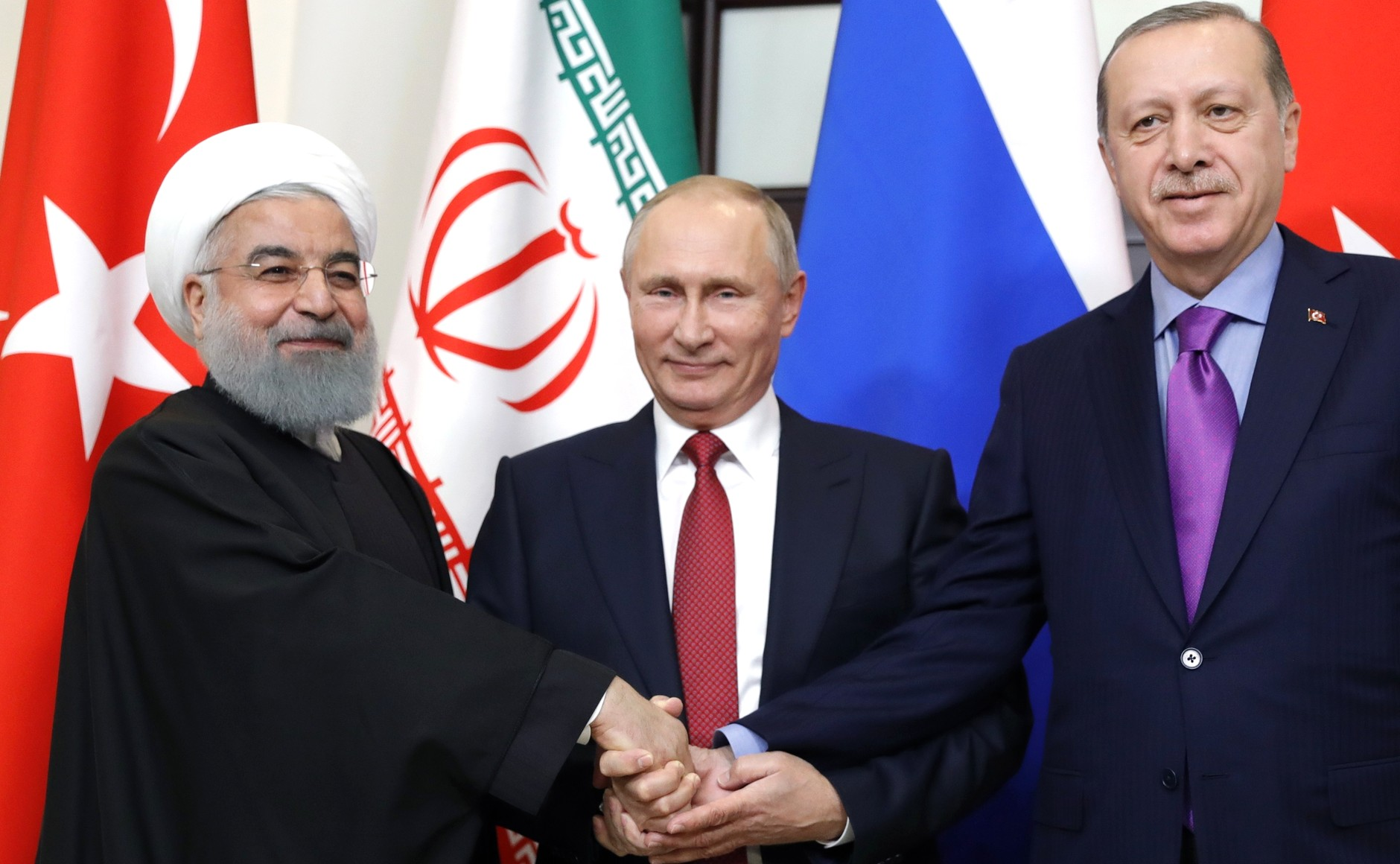
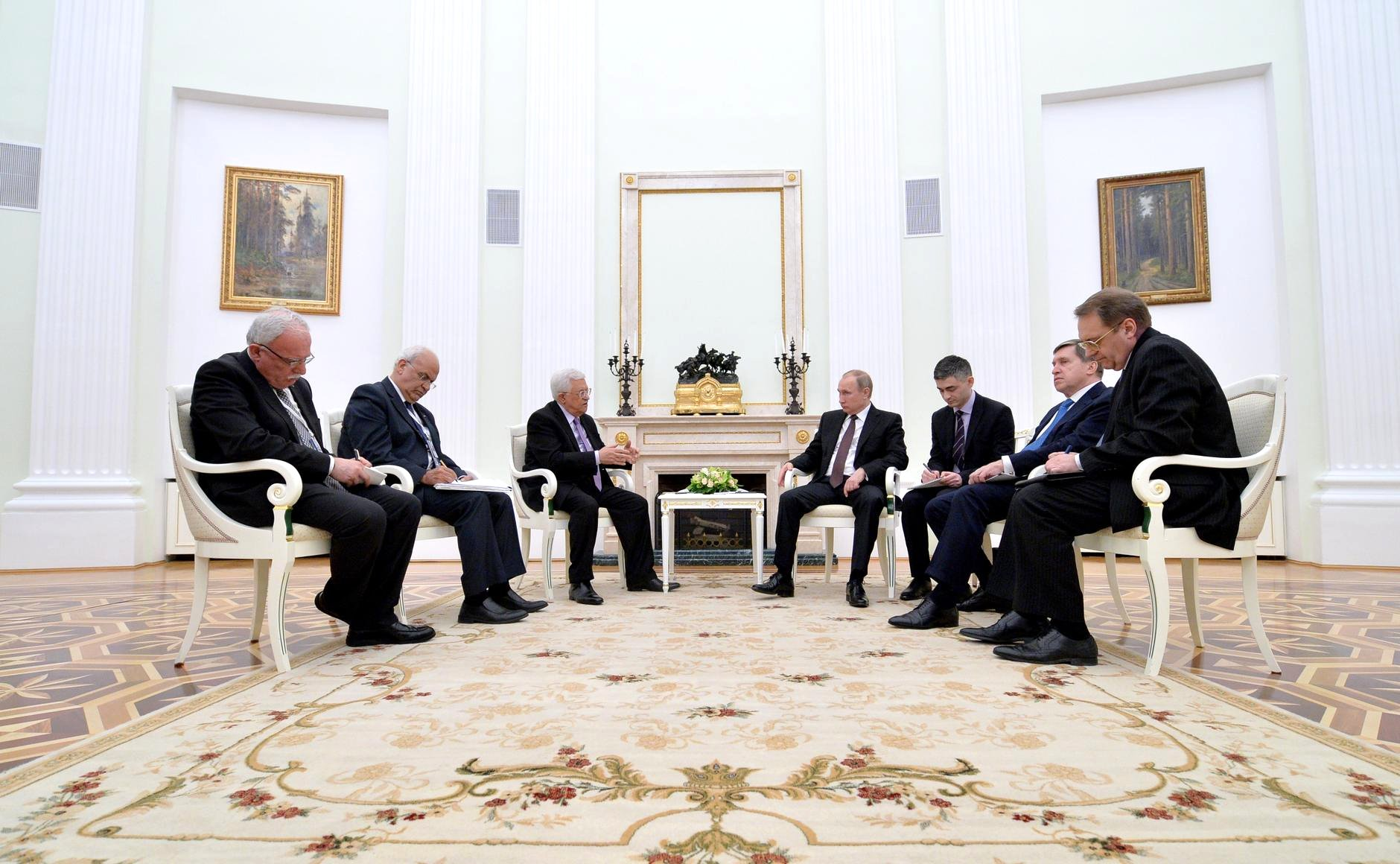
Putin with Middle Eastern leaders.

During the Iraq disarmament crisis in 2002–2003, Putin opposed Washington's move to invade Iraq, without the benefit of a United Nations Security Council resolution explicitly authorizing the use of military force. After the official end of the war was announced, US President George W. Bush asked the United Nations to lift sanctions on Iraq. Putin supported lifting of the sanctions in due course, arguing that the UN commission first be given a chance to complete its work on the search for weapons of mass destruction in Iraq.

During the 2004 Ukrainian presidential election, Putin twice visited Ukraine before the election to show his support for Ukrainian Prime Minister Viktor Yanukovych, who was widely seen as a pro-Kremlin candidate, and he congratulated him on his anticipated victory before official election results had even been released. Putin's personal support for Yanukovych was criticized as unwarranted interference in the affairs of a sovereign state (See also The Orange revolution). Crises also developed in Russia's relations with Georgia and Moldova, both former Soviet republics accusing Moscow of supporting separatist entities in their territories (i.e., Abkhazia, South Ossetia, and Transnistria.)

In 2005, Putin and former German Chancellor Gerhard Schröder negotiated the construction of a major gas pipeline over the Baltic exclusively between Russia and Germany. Schröder also attended Putin's 53rd birthday celebration in Saint Petersburg the same year.

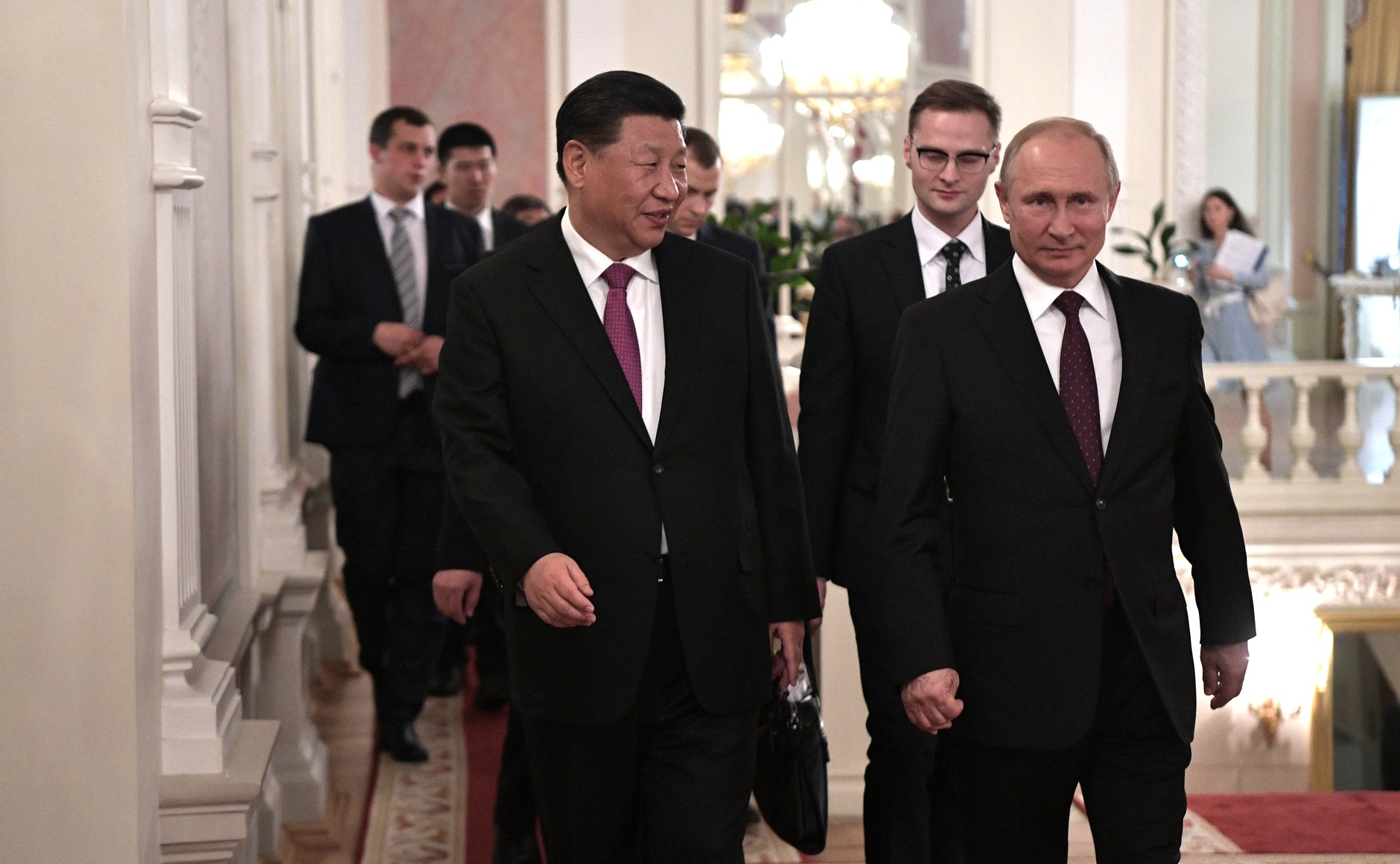
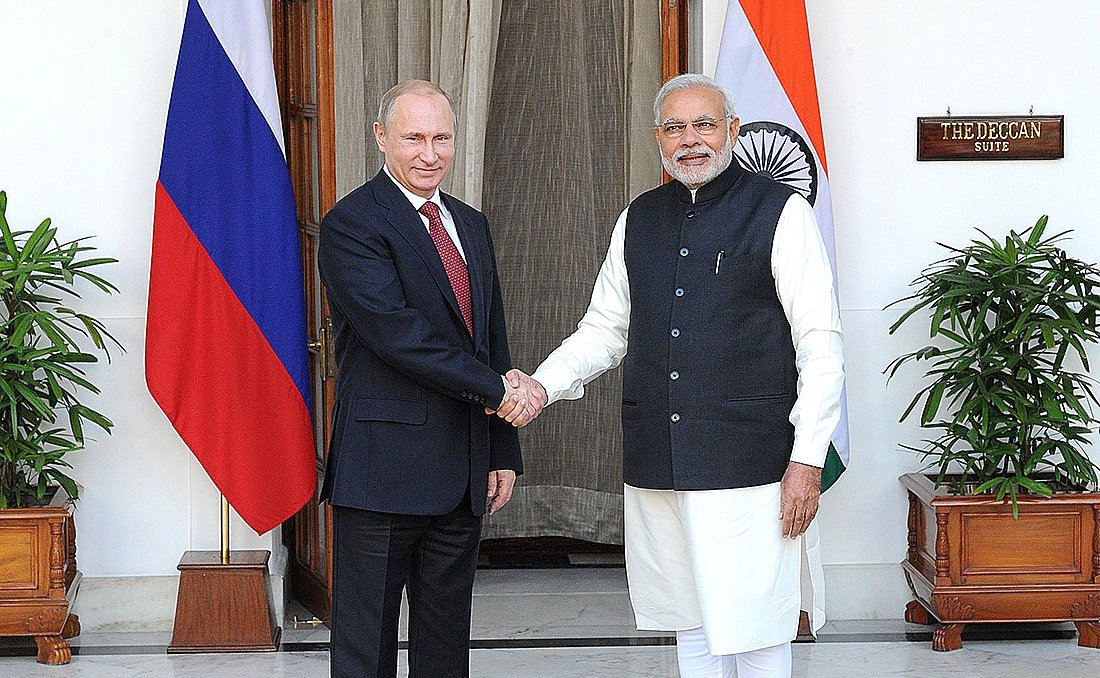
Putin and his homologue from China, Xi Jinping and Narendra Modi from India.

The end of 2006 brought strained relations between Russia and Britain, in the wake of the death of a former FSB officer in London by poisoning. On 20 July 2007, UK Prime Minister Gordon Brown expelled "four Russian envoys over Putin's refusal to extradite ex-KGB agent Andrei Lugovoi, wanted in the UK for the murder of fellow former spy Alexander Litvinenko in London." The Russian constitution prohibits the extradition of Russian nationals to third countries. British Foreign Secretary David Miliband said that "this situation is not unique, and other countries have amended their constitutions, for example, to give effect to the European Arrest Warrant."

When Litvinenko was dying from radiation poisoning, he accused Putin of directing the assassination, in a statement which was released shortly after his death by his friend Alex Goldfarb. Critics have doubted that Litvinenko is the true author of the released statement. When asked about the Litvinenko accusations, Putin said that a statement released posthumously of its author "naturally deserves no comment."

The expulsions were seen as "the biggest rift since the countries expelled each other's diplomats in 1996 after a spying dispute." In response to the situation, Putin stated, "I think we will overcome this mini-crisis. Russian-British relations will develop normally. On both the Russian side and the British side, we are interested in the development of those relations." Despite this, British Ambassador Tony Brenton was told by the Russian Foreign Ministry that UK diplomats would be given 10 days before they were expelled in response. The Russian government also announced that it would suspend issuing visas to UK officials, and froze cooperation on counterterrorism, in response to Britain suspending contacts with their Federal Security Service.

Alexander Shokhin, president of the Russian Union of Industrialists and Entrepreneurs, warned that British investors in Russia will "face greater scrutiny from tax and regulatory authorities. They could also lose out in government tenders." Some see the crisis as originating with Britain's decision to grant Putin's former patron, Russian billionaire Boris Berezovsky, political asylum in 2003. Earlier in 2007, Berezovsky had called for the overthrow of Putin.

==== 2007–2009 ====
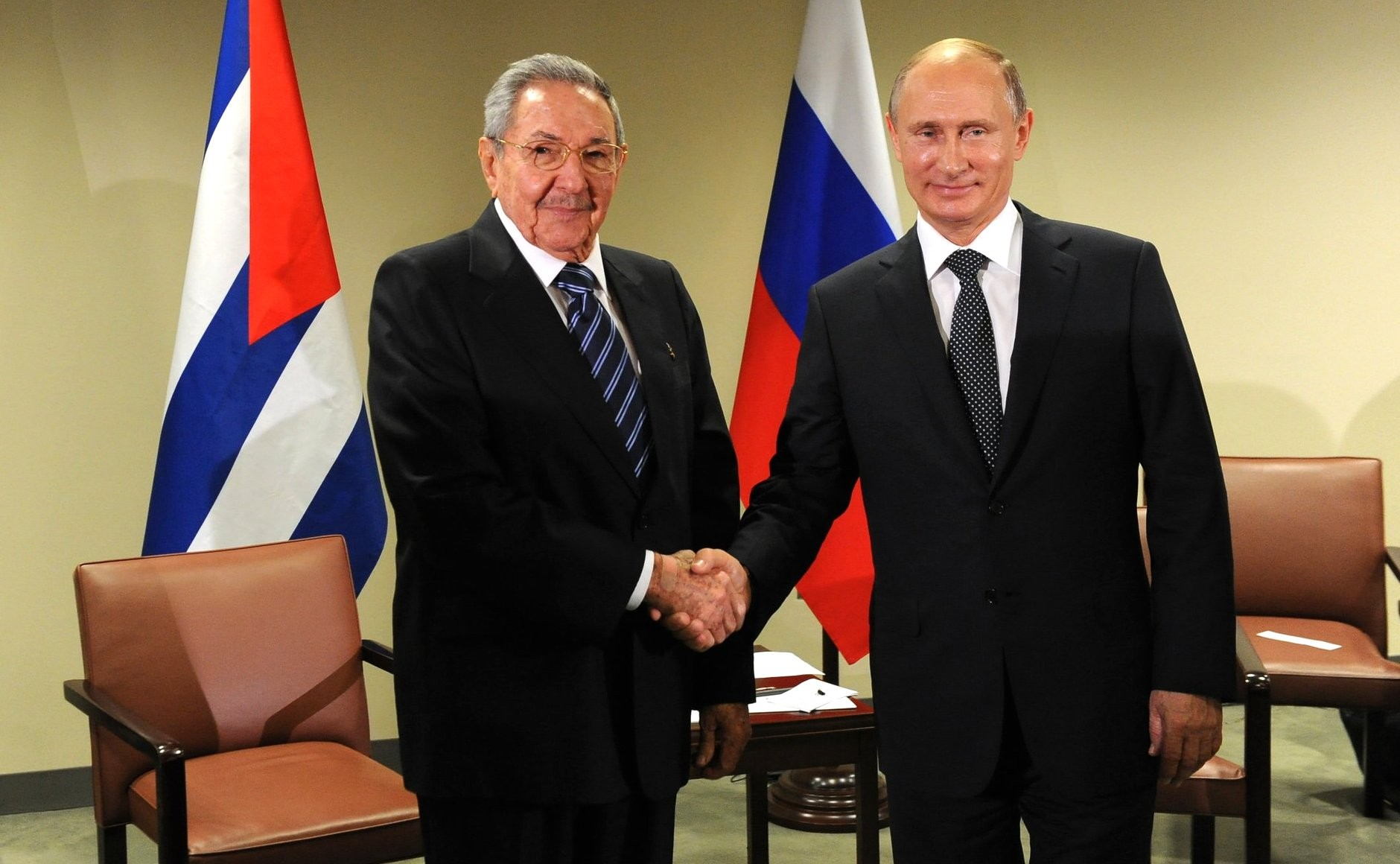
Meeting with Raúl Castro from Cuba

Putin took an active personal part in promoting the Act of Canonical Communion with the Moscow Patriarchate signed in May 2007, which restored relations between the Moscow-based Russian Orthodox Church and Russian Orthodox Church Outside of Russia (ROCOR) after the 80-year schism.

The Commonwealth of Independent States (CIS), seen in Moscow as its traditional sphere of influence, became one of Putin's foreign policy priorities, as the EU and NATO have grown to encompass much of Central Europe and, more recently, the Baltic states.

On 26 April 2007, in his annual address to the Federal Assembly, Putin announced plans to declare a moratorium on the observance of the Treaty on Conventional Armed Forces in Europe by Russia until all NATO members ratified it and started observing its provisions, as Russia had been doing on a unilateral basis. Putin argues that as new NATO members have not even signed the treaty so far, an imbalance in the presence of NATO and Russian armed forces in Europe creates a real threat and an unpredictable situation for Russia. NATO members said they would refuse to ratify the treaty until Russia complied with its 1999 commitments made in Istanbul, whereby Russia should remove troops and military equipment from Moldova and Georgia. Russian Foreign Minister, Sergey Lavrov, was quoted as saying in response that "Russia has long since fulfilled all its Istanbul obligations relevant to CFE."

On 11 December 2007, Russia suspended its participation in the CFE. On 12 December 2007, the United States officially stated that it "deeply regretted the Russian Federation's decision to 'suspend' implementation of its obligations under the Treaty on Conventional Armed Forces in Europe (CFE)." State Department spokesman Sean McCormack added in a written statement that "Russia's conventional forces are the largest on the European continent, and its unilateral action damages this successful arms control regime." NATO's primary concern arising from Russia's suspension is that Moscow could now accelerate its military presence in the Northern Caucasus.

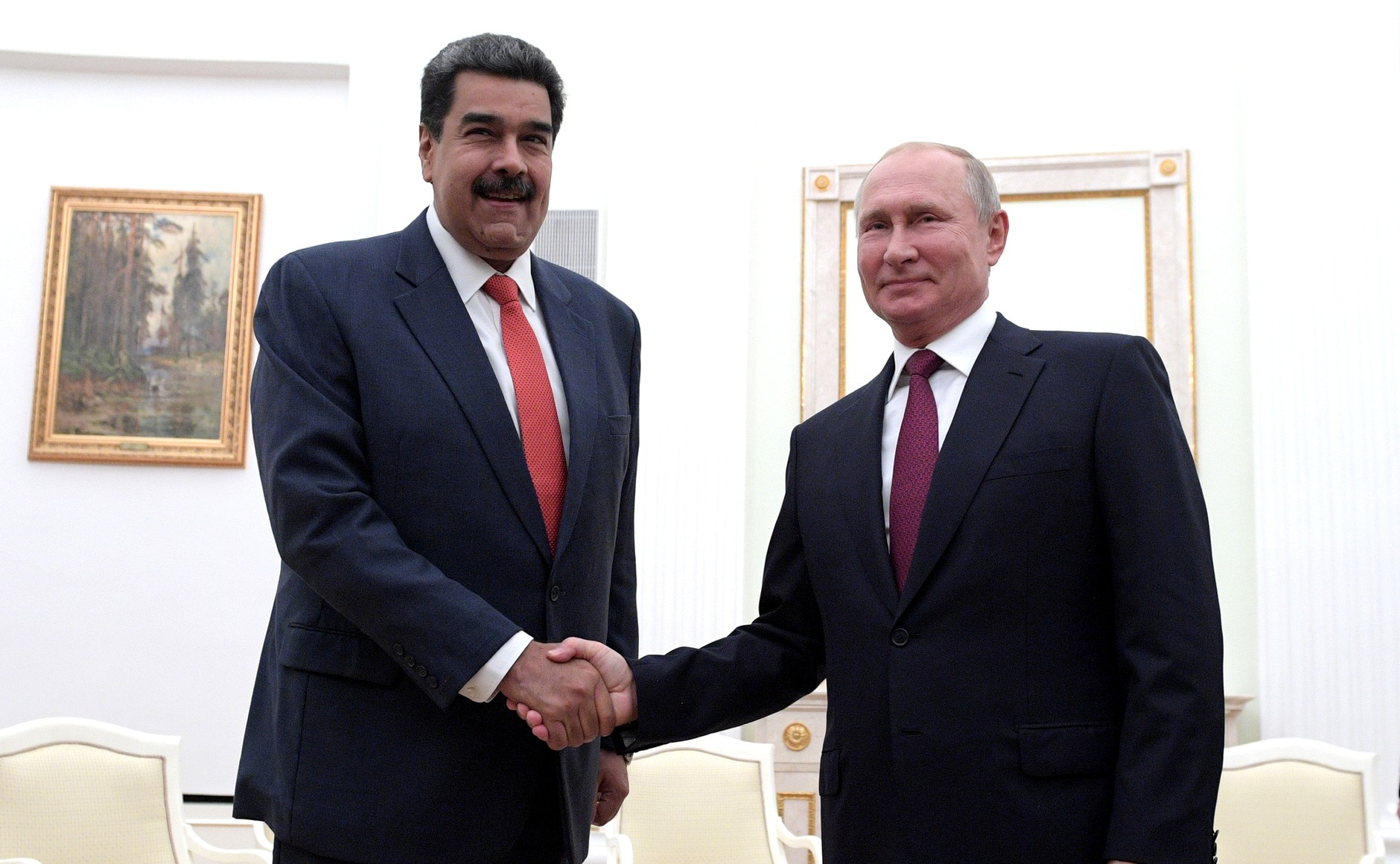
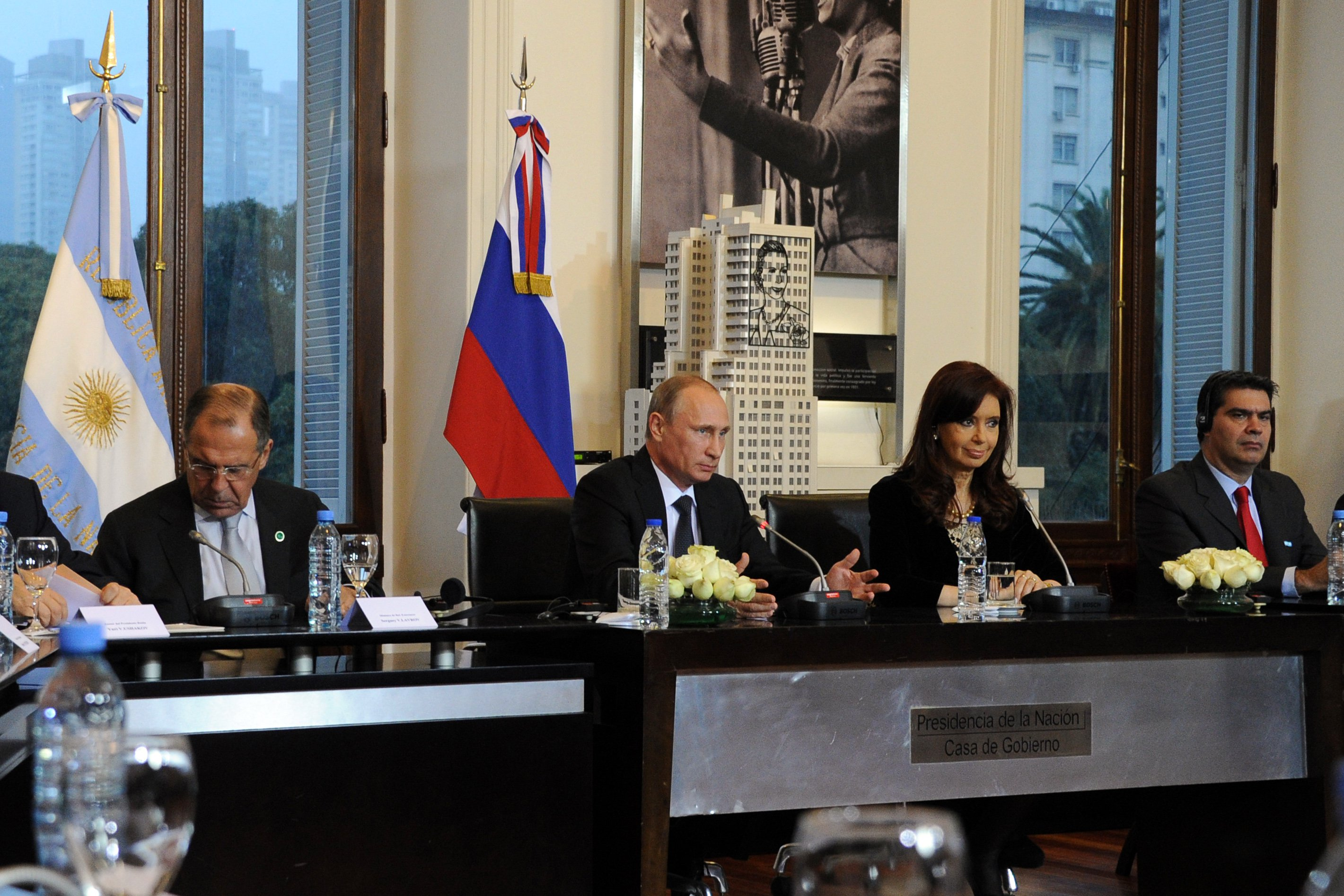
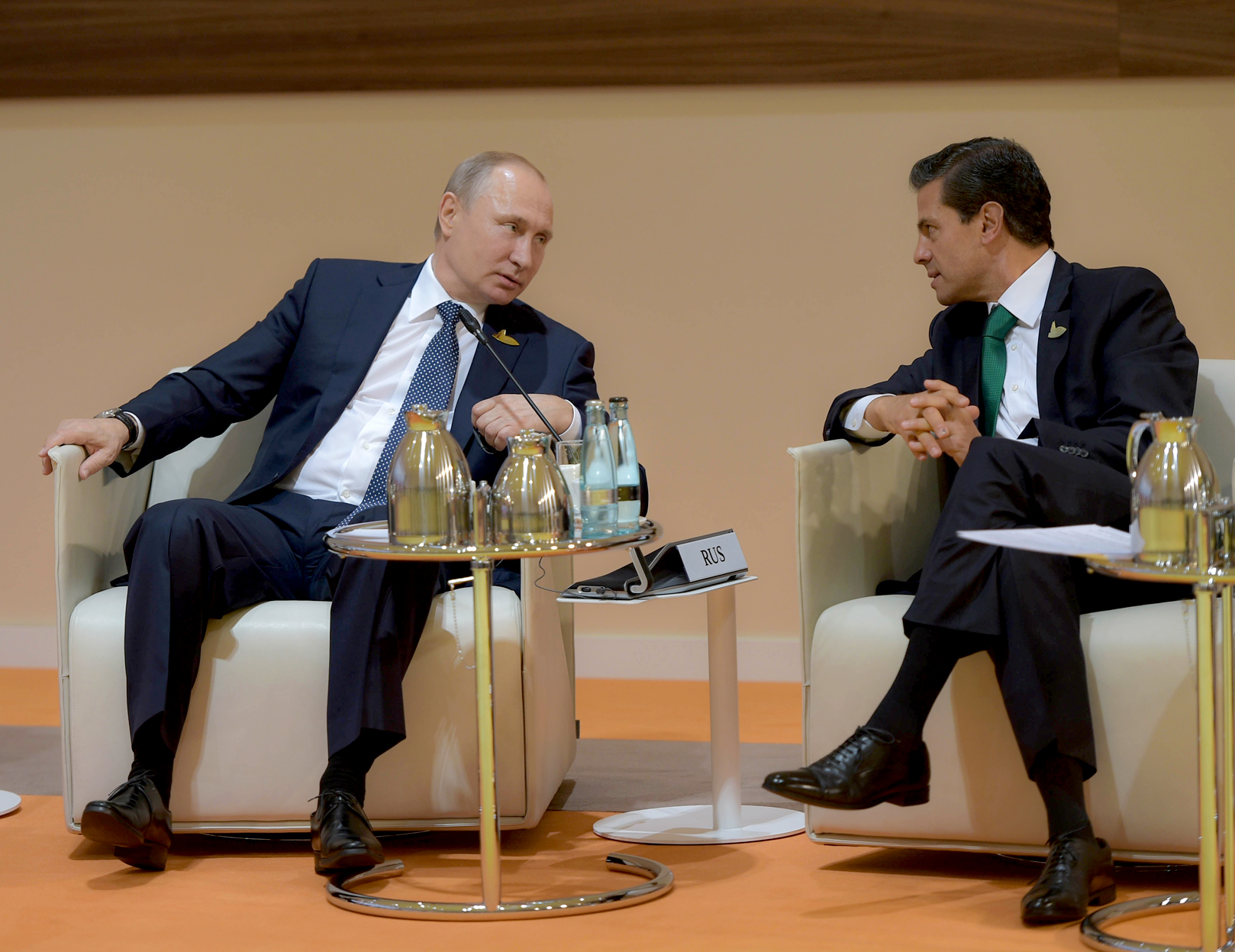
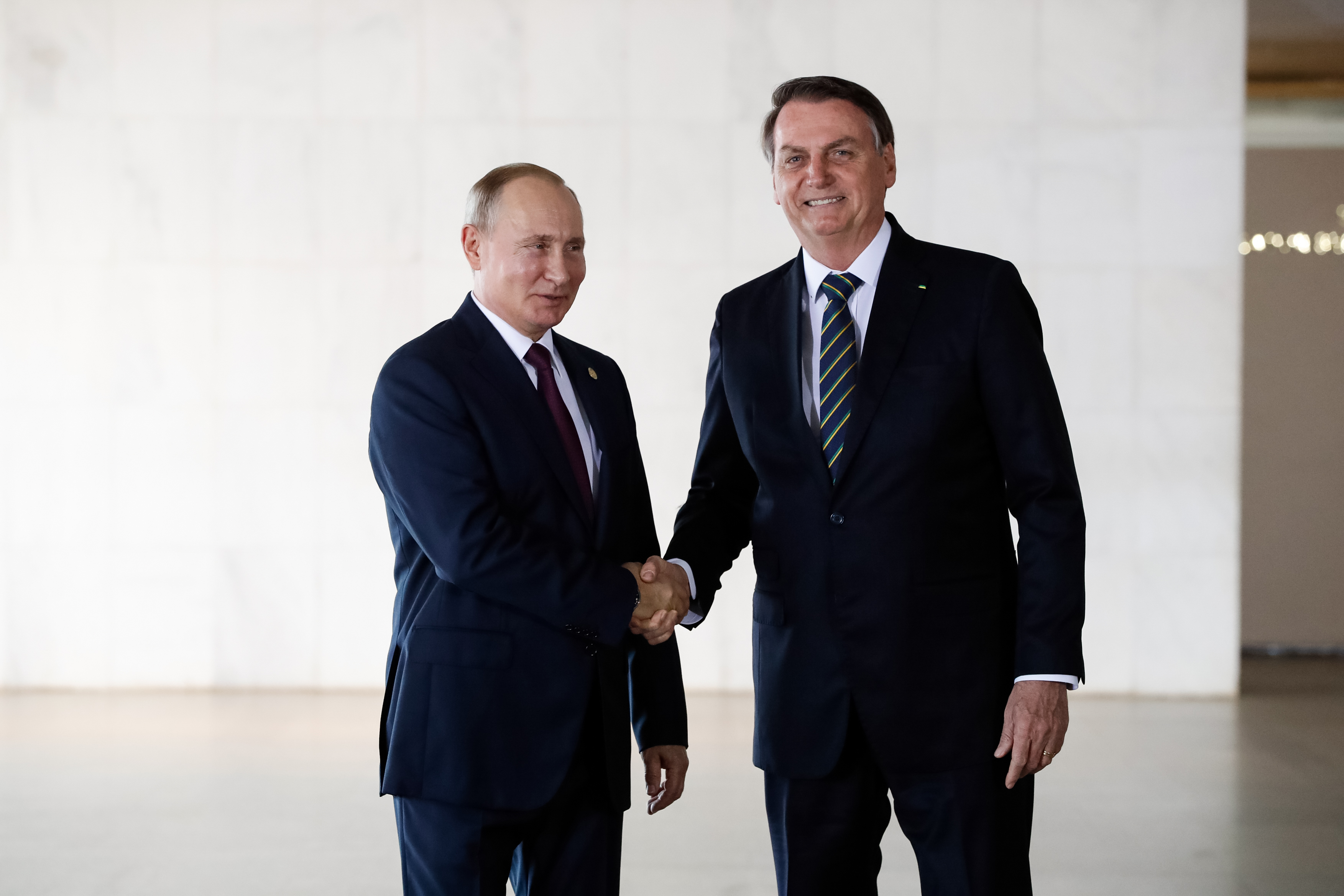
Putin with Latin American leaders.

The months following Putin's Munich speech were marked by tension and a surge in rhetoric on both sides of the Atlantic. As a result, Vladimir Putin stated at the anniversary of the Victory Day, "these threats are not becoming fewer, but are only transforming and changing their appearance. These new threats, just as under the Third Reich, show the same contempt for human life, and the same aspiration to establish an exclusive dictate over the world." This was interpreted by some Russian and Western commentators as comparing the United States to Nazi Germany.

In 2007, on the eve of the 33rd Summit of the G8 in Heiligendamm, Germany, US journalist Anne Applebaum, who is married to a Polish politician, wrote that "Whether by waging cyberwarfare on Estonia, threatening the gas supplies of Lithuania, or boycotting Georgian wine and Polish meat, [Putin] has, over the past few years, made it clear that he intends to reassert Russian influence in the former communist states of Europe, whether those states want Russian influence or not. At the same time, he has also made it clear that he no longer sees Western nations as mere benign trading partners, but rather as Cold War-style threats."

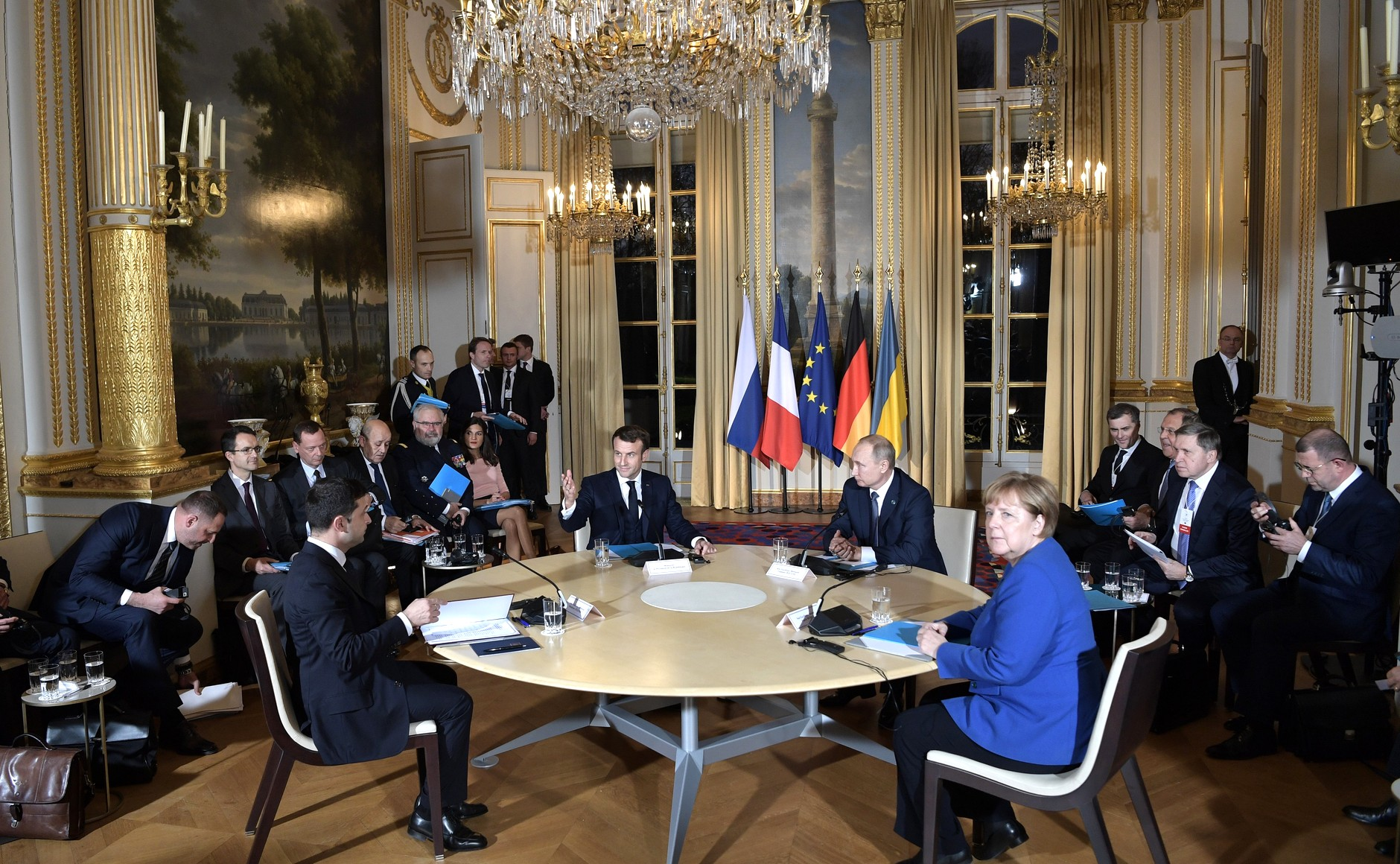
Meeting with European leaders, 2019

In his article "No wonder they like Putin," British academic Norman Stone compared Putin to General Charles de Gaulle. Adi Ignatius argues that "Putin... is not a Stalin. There are no mass purges in Russia today, no broad climate of terror. But Putin is reconstituting a strong state, and anyone who stands in his way will pay for it." Both Russian and US officials consistently denied the idea of a new Cold War. At the Munich Conference, US Secretary of Defense Robert Gates said, "We all face many common problems and challenges that must be addressed in partnership with other countries, including Russia.... one Cold War was quite enough." In June 2007, just prior to the 33rd G8 Summit, Vladimir Putin said, "We do not want confrontation; we want to engage in dialogue. However, we want a dialogue that acknowledges the equality of both parties' interests."

On 7 June 2007, Putin, publicly opposed to a US missile shield in Europe, presented President George W. Bush with a counterproposal of sharing the use of the Soviet-era radar system in Azerbaijan, rather than building a new system in Poland and the Czech Republic. Putin expressed readiness to modernize the Gabala radar station, which has been in operation since 1986. Putin proposed it would not be necessary to place interceptor missiles in Poland then, but interceptors could be placed in NATO member Turkey or Iraq. Putin suggested equal involvement of interested European countries in the project.

In June 2007, in an interview with journalists of G8 countries, when answering the question of whether Russian nuclear forces may be focused on European targets in case "the United States continues building a strategic shield in Poland and the Czech Republic," Putin admitted that "if part of the United States' nuclear capability is situated in Europe and that our military experts consider that they represent a potential threat then we will have to take appropriate retaliatory steps. What steps? Of course we must have new targets in Europe."

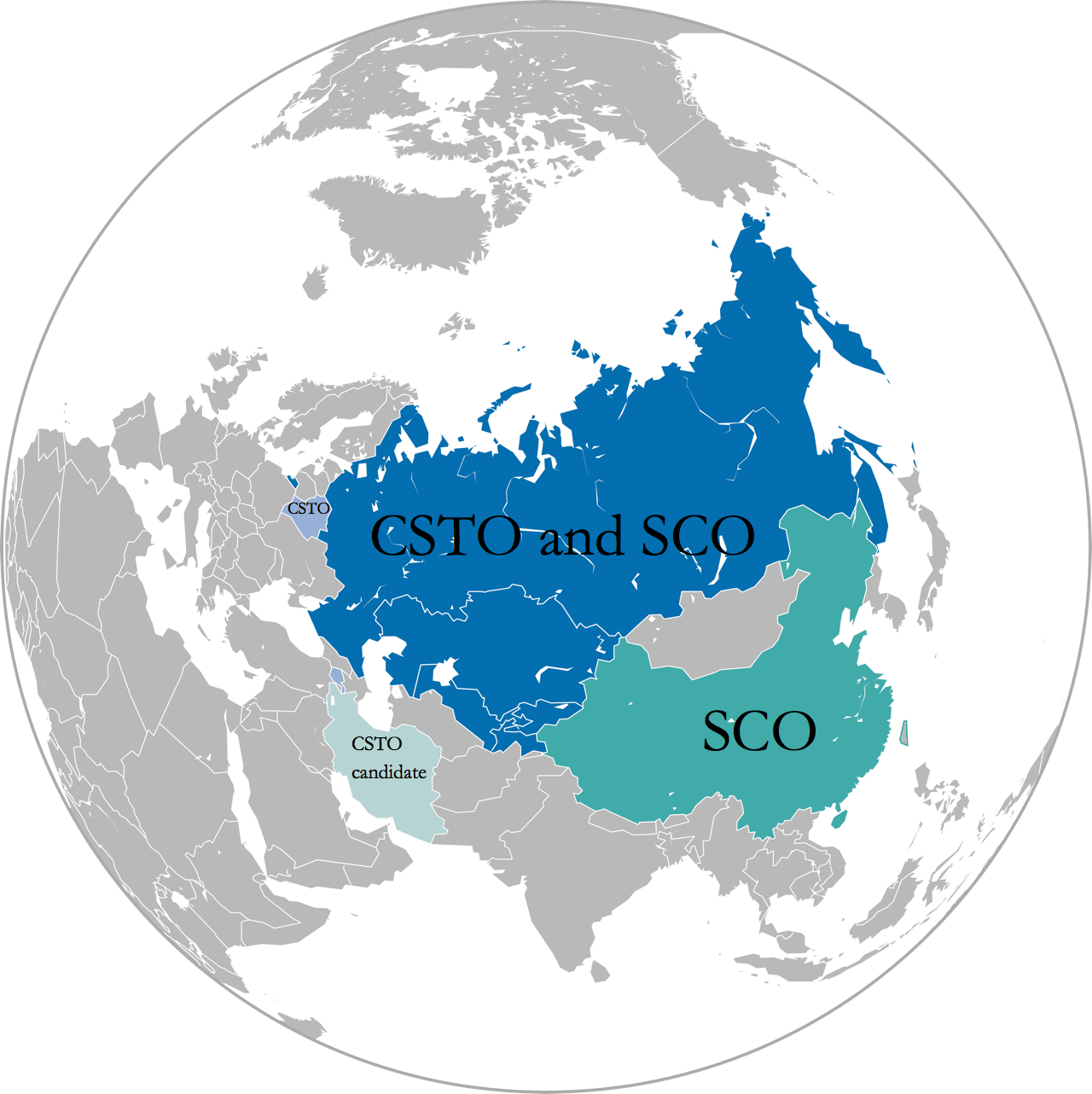
SCO and CSTO members

Following the 2007 Peace Mission military exercises jointly conducted by the Shanghai Cooperation Organisation (SCO) member states, Putin announced in August 2007 that the resumption on a permanent basis of long-distance patrol flights of Russia's strategic bombers that were suspended in 1992. The announcement made during the SCO summit in the light of joint Russian-Chinese military exercises, first-ever in history to be held on Russian territory, makes some believe that Putin is inclined to set up an anti-NATO bloc, or the Asian version of OPEC.

When presented with the suggestion that "Western observers are already likening the SCO to a military organisation that would stand in opposition to NATO," Putin answered that "this kind of comparison is inappropriate in both form and substance." Russian Chief of the General Staff Yury Baluyevsky was quoted as saying that "there should be no talk of creating a military or political alliance or union of any kind, because this would contradict the founding principles of SCO."

The resumption of long-distance flights of the Russian Air Force's strategic bombers was followed by the announcement by Russian Defense Minister Anatoly Serdyukov during his meeting with Putin on 5 December 2007, that 11 ships, including the aircraft carrier Kuznetsov, would take part in the first major navy sortie into the Mediterranean since Soviet times. The sortie was to be backed up by 47 aircraft, including strategic bombers. According to Serdyukov, this is an effort to resume regular Russian naval patrols on the world's oceans, the view that is also supported by Russian media. The military analyst from Novaya Gazeta Pavel Felgenhauer believes that the accident-prone Kuznetsov is scarcely seaworthy, and is more of a menace to her crew than any putative enemy.

In September 2007, Putin visited Indonesia, and in doing so, became the first Russian leader to visit the country in more than 50 years. In the same month, Putin also attended the APEC meeting held in Sydney, Australia, where he met with Australian Prime Minister John Howard, and signed a uranium trade deal. This was the first visit of a Russian president to Australia.

In October 2007, Putin visited Tehran, Iran to participate in the Second Caspian Summit, where he met with Iranian leader Mahmoud Ahmadinejad. Other participants were leaders of Azerbaijan, Kazakhstan, and Turkmenistan. This is the first visit of a leader from the Kremlin to Iran, since Joseph Stalin's participation in the Tehran Conference in 1943. At a press conference after the summit, Putin stated that "all our (Caspian) states have the right to develop their peaceful nuclear programmes without any restrictions." During the summit, it was also agreed that its participants, under no circumstances, would let any third-party state use their territory as a base for aggression or military action against any other participant.

On 26 October 2007, at a press conference following the 20th Russia-EU Summit in Portugal, Putin proposed to create a Russian-European Institute for Freedom and Democracy, headquartered either in Brussels, or in one of the European capitals, and added that "we are ready to supply funds for financing it, just as Europe covers the costs of projects in Russia." This newly proposed institution is expected to monitor human rights violations in Europe and contribute to the development of European democracy.

Russian President Vladimir Putin and US President George W. Bush failed to resolve their differences over US plans for a missile defense system based in Poland and the Czech Republic, in their meeting in the Russian Black Sea resort of Sochi in April 2008. Putin made clear that he did not agree with the decision to establish sites in the Eastern European countries. However, he said that the two had agreed to a "strategic framework" to guide future Russian–US relations, in which the two countries recognized that the era in which each had considered the other to be a "strategic threat or enemy" was over.

Putin expressed cautious optimism that the two sides could find a way to cooperate over missile defense and described his eight-year relationship with President Bush as "mostly positive." The Sochi summit was the Bush's last meeting with Putin as a sitting president, following both leaders' attendance at the NATO summit in Romania earlier that month. That summit also highlighted differences between Washington and Moscow, over US-backed proposals to extend the military alliance to include the former Soviet republics of Ukraine and Georgia. Russia opposes the proposed expansion, fearing it will reduce its own influence over its neighbours.

Fareed Zakaria suggested that the 2008 South Ossetia War turned out to be a diplomatic disaster for Russia. He added that it was a major strategic blunder, turning neighboring nations such as Ukraine to embrace the United States and other Western nations more. Hungarian-American geostrategist George Friedman countered that both the war and Russian foreign policy have been successful in expanding Russia's influence.

==== 2010–2016 ====
The mid-2010s marked a dramatic downturn in Russian relations with the West, with some even considering it the start of a new Cold War. The United States and Russia supported opposing sides in the Syrian Civil War, and Washington regarded Moscow as obstructionist in its support for the Bashar al-Assad regime.

In 2013, for the first time since 1960, the United States cancelled a summit with Russia, after the latter granted asylum to Edward Snowden.

However, the greatest increase in tensions ensued from the Ukraine crisis that began in 2014, which saw the Russian annexation of Crimea. Russia also inflamed a separatist uprising in the Donbas region. The United States responded to these events by imposing sanctions on Russia, with most European countries following suit due to concerns over Russian interference in the affairs of Central and Eastern Europe.

In October 2015, after years of supporting the Syrian government indirectly, Russia directly intervened in the conflict, turning the tide in favor of the Assad regime. Already strained over Russian support for Assad, Russian-Turkish relations deteriorated even further, especially after the Turkish Air Force shot down a Russian jet fighter in November 2015. In 2015, Russia also formed the Eurasian Economic Union with Armenia, Kazakhstan, and Belarus.

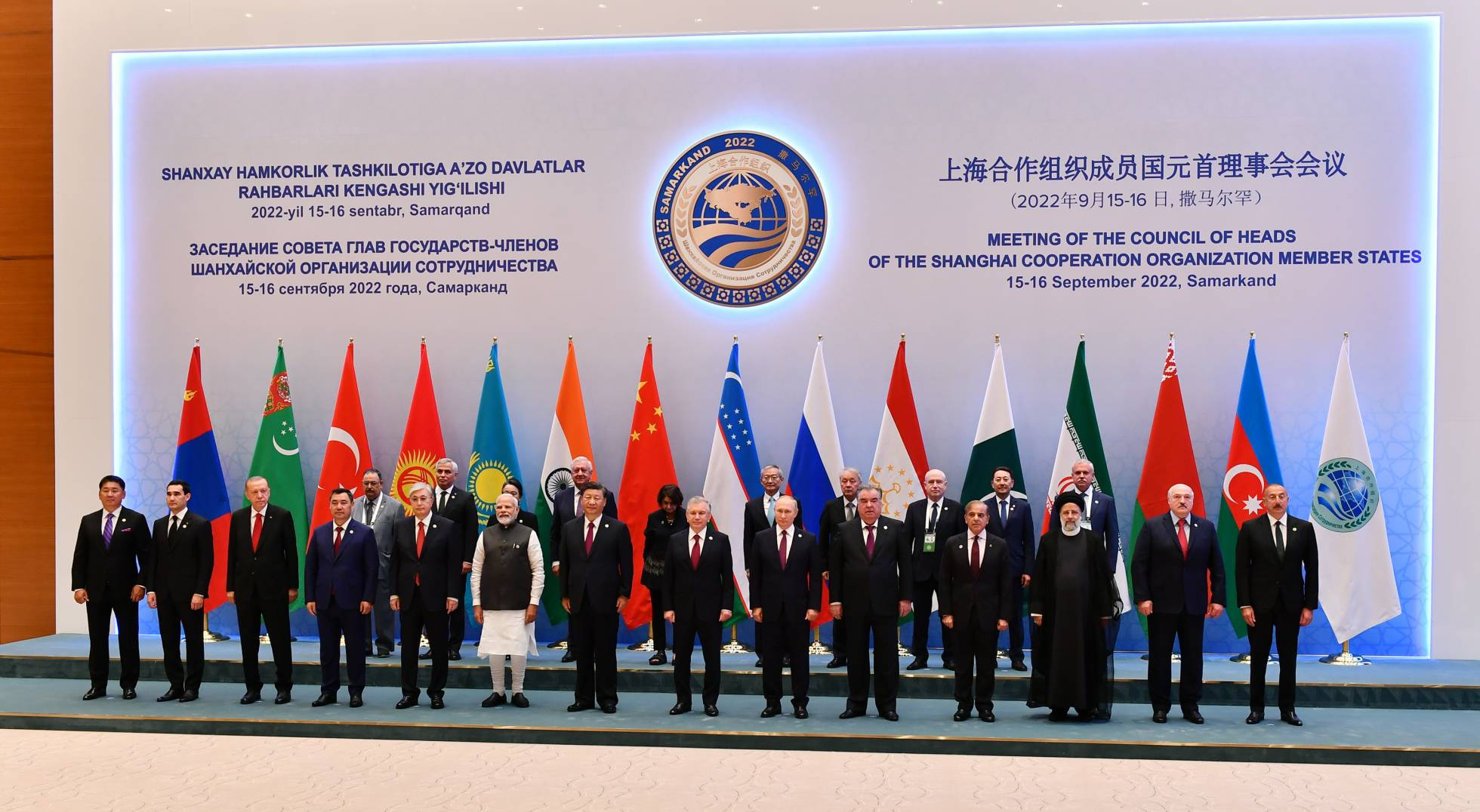
Russian President Vladimir Putin, Chinese leader Xi Jinping, Indian Prime Minister Narendra Modi and other leaders at the Shanghai Cooperation Organization summit in Uzbekistan on 16 September 2022

The Russian government disapproves the expansion of NATO into Eastern Europe, claiming that Western leaders promised that NATO would not expand beyond its 1990s borders.

==== 2017–2022 ====
Russia Countries on Russia's "Unfriendly Countries List." Countries and territories on the list imposed sanctions on Russia following the Russian invasion of Ukraine in 2022.

For decades, the dispute between Japan and Russia over the ownership of the Kuril Islands has hindered closer cooperation between the two countries. However, since 2017, high-level talks involving Prime Minister Shinzō Abe have been ongoing in an attempt to resolve the situation.

Russia's power on the international stage depends in large part on its revenue from fossil fuel exports. If the world completes a transition to renewable energy, and international demand for Russian raw materials resources is dramatically reduced, so may Russia's international power be. Although Russian oil and gas exports receive more attention, the country is also one of the world's three largest coal exporters and this industry is important for some Russian towns and provinces. Russia is ranked 148 out of 156 countries in the index of Geopolitical Gains and Losses after energy transition (GeGaLo).

Russia lacks strong alliances. The Collective Security Treaty Organization is an attempt to develop a successor alliance to the Warsaw Pact but it is comparatively weak. Russia participates in the Shanghai Cooperation Organization, but the SCO is a multilateral cooperation group rather than a military alliance and China plays the leading role in the organization.

==== 2022–present ====
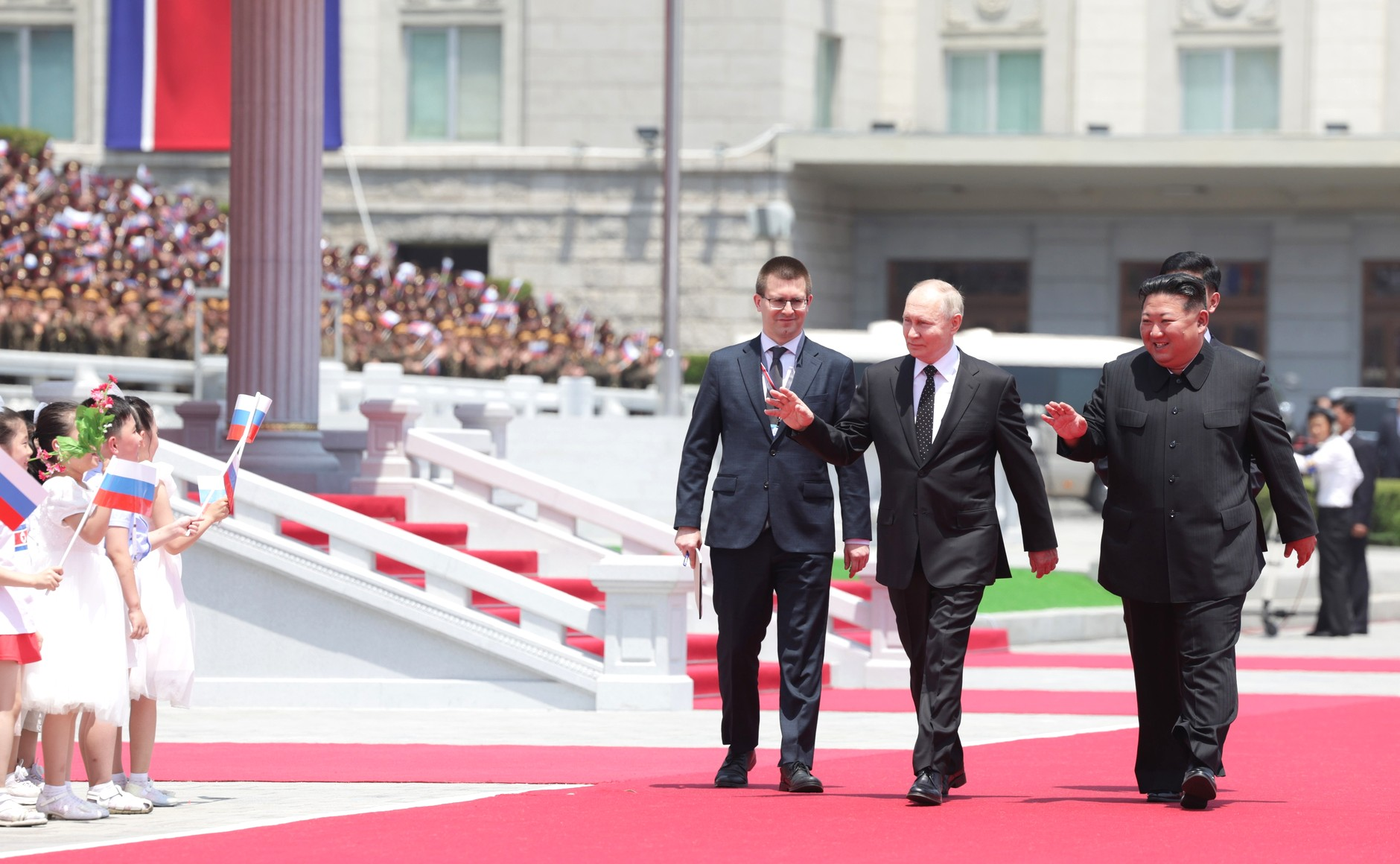
Putin and North Korean leader Kim Jong Un in Pyongyang, North Korea, 19 June 2024

When Russia invaded Ukraine in 2022, its foreign policy changed significantly after 141 countries approved a March 2022 UN resolution condemning the invasion and demanding a full withdrawal of Russian forces and after more than 600 Russian diplomats were declared persona non grata that same year.

Russia attempted to solidify its alliances in Africa, Asia, and South America. Historically, the former Soviet Union and later the Russian Federation had good relations with modern states in those regions, being on the side of oppressed populations, such as during Apartheid in South Africa, and opposing imperialism worldwide. Later in 2022, many African and South American countries abstained from voting against Russia in the UN Security Council for its military involvements in Ukraine. Russia's influence in Africa and South America is expanding, particularly in the areas of mining and security services. As of July 2022, most African and South American countries had a keen interest in cheap fossil energy and had no sanctions in place against Russian entities.

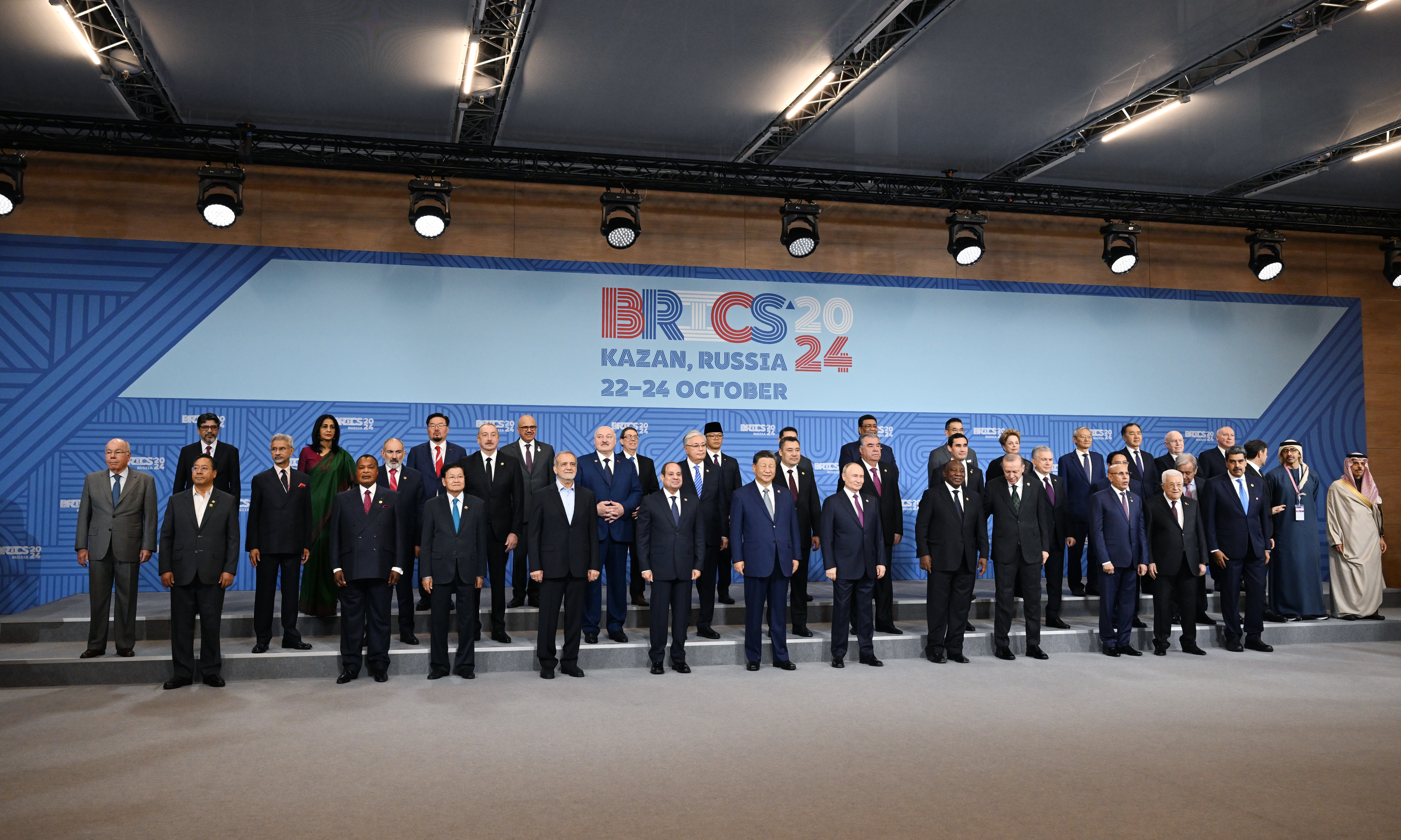
Foreign guests at the 16th BRICS summit in Kazan, Russia, 23 October 2024

In 2023, Russia unveiled a Eurasianist, anti-Western foreign policy strategy in a document titled The Concept of the Foreign Policy of the Russian Federation approved by Vladimir Putin. The document defines Russia as a "unique country-civilization and a vast Eurasian and Euro-Pacific power" that seeks to create a "Greater Eurasian Partnership" by pursuing close relations with PR China, India, countries of the Islamic World and the rest of the Global South (Latin America and Southern Africa.) The policy identifies the United States and other English-speaking countries as "the main inspirer, organizer and executor of the aggressive anti-Russian policy of the collective West" and seeks the end of US dominance in the international scene. The document also adopts a neo-Soviet posture, positioning Russia as the successor state of USSR and calling for the spread of "accurate information" regarding the "decisive contribution of the Soviet Union" in shaping the post-WWII international order and the United Nations.

In 2024, Mali, Niger, and Burkina Faso reached an agreement with Russia to obtain telecom and surveillance satellites, aiming to strengthen border security and improve communications. These West African nations, facing ongoing Islamist insurgencies, sought Russian support after tensions with Western allies. This move came shortly after an Islamist militants attack on an airport in Mali, highlighting the region's unstable security situation.

In Africa, Russia uses anti-French and anti-Western propaganda through clandestine agencies.

In response to widespread sanctions and military support for Ukraine, Russia has been accused of waging a campaign of hybrid warfare across the continent. This includes confirmed and suspected acts of sabotage, espionage, and influence operations intended to weaken European resolve and infrastructure.

== Diplomatic relations ==
List of countries which Russia maintains diplomatic relations with:

#	Country	Date
1	Denmark	8 November 1493
2	Iran	1521
3	United Kingdom	24 August 1553
4	Netherlands	1613
5	France	November 1615
6	Sweden	15 March 1722
7	Portugal	24 October 1779
8	United States	14 July 1809
9	Spain	20 July 1812
10	Switzerland	6 March 1814
11	Brazil	3 October 1828
12	Serbia	23 February 1838
13	Greece	5 September 1838
14	Belgium	11 April 1853
15	Japan	7 February 1855
16	Uruguay	10 December 1857
17	Italy	2 July 1862
18	Peru	17 January 1873
19	Romania	24 October 1878
20	Bulgaria	7 July 1879
21	Mexico	11 December 1890
22	Luxembourg	7 March 1891
23	Thailand	3 July 1897
24	Bolivia	9 August 1898
25	Panama	21 November 1903
26	Norway	7 November 1905
27	Afghanistan	27 May 1919
28	Finland	31 December 1920
29	Poland	27 April 1921
30	Mongolia	5 November 1921
31	Austria	25 February 1924
32	Albania	4 July 1924
33	Turkey	8 November 1924
34	Saudi Arabia	16 February 1926
35	Hungary	4 February 1934
36	Czech Republic	9 June 1934
37	Colombia	25 June 1935
38	Iraq	16 May 1941
39	Canada	12 June 1942
40	Australia	10 October 1942
41	Ethiopia	21 April 1943
42	Egypt	26 August 1943
43	Iceland	4 October 1943
44	New Zealand	13 April 1944
45	Costa Rica	8 May 1944
46	Syria	21 July 1944
47	Lebanon	31 July 1944
48	Dominican Republic	14 March 1945
49	Venezuela	14 March 1945
50	Guatemala	19 April 1945
51	Argentina	6 June 1946
52	India	14 April 1947
53	Myanmar	18 February 1948
54	Pakistan	1 May 1948
55	Israel	15 May 1948
56	North Korea	12 October 1948
57	China	2 October 1949
58	Vietnam	30 January 1950
59	Indonesia	3 February 1950
60	Germany	13 September 1955
61	Libya	25 September 1955
62	Yemen	31 October 1955
63	Sudan	3 January 1956
64	Liberia	11 January 1956
65	Tunisia	11 July 1956
66	Nepal	20 July 1956
67	Cambodia	6 November 1956
68	Sri Lanka	19 February 1957
69	Ghana	15 January 1958
70	Morocco	29 August 1958
71	Guinea	3 October 1958
72	Togo	1 May 1960
73	Cuba	8 May 1960
74	Democratic Republic of the Congo	29 June 1960
75	Republic of the Congo	7 July 1960
76	Somalia	30 September 1960
77	Laos	7 October 1960
78	Mali	8 October 1960
79	Cyprus	18 November 1960
80	Nigeria	25 November 1960
81	Central African Republic	15 December 1960
82	Sierra Leone	26 April 1961
83	Tanzania	10 December 1961
84	Algeria	19 March 1962
85	Benin	4 June 1962
86	Senegal	14 June 1962
87	Burundi	1 October 1962
88	Uganda	11 October 1962
89	Kuwait	11 March 1963
90	Jordan	20 August 1963
91	Rwanda	17 October 1963
92	Kenya	14 December 1963
93	Cameroon	18 February 1964
94	Mauritania	12 July 1964
95	Zambia	2 October 1964
96	Chad	24 November 1964
97	Gambia	17 July 1965
98	Maldives	21 September 1966
99	Ivory Coast	23 January 1967
100	Burkina Faso	18 February 1967
101	Malaysia	3 April 1967
102	Malta	26 July 1967
103	Mauritius	17 March 1968
104	Singapore	1 June 1968
105	Equatorial Guinea	7 December 1968
106	Ecuador	12 November 1969
107	Botswana	17 March 1970
108	Guyana	17 December 1970
109	United Arab Emirates	8 December 1971
110	Bangladesh	25 January 1972
111	Niger	17 February 1972
112	Madagascar	29 September 1972
113	Ireland	29 September 1973
114	Guinea-Bissau	30 September 1973
115	Gabon	15 October 1973
116	Fiji	30 January 1974
117	Trinidad and Tobago	6 June 1974
118	Jamaica	12 March 1975
119	Mozambique	28 June 1975
120	São Tomé and Príncipe	9 August 1975
121	Tonga	14 October 1975
122	Cape Verde	25 November 1975
123	Comoros	6 January 1976
124	Papua New Guinea	19 May 1976
125	Philippines	2 June 1976
126	Seychelles	30 June 1976
127	Angola	8 October 1976
128	Suriname	2 November 1976
129	Samoa	2 July 1977
130	Djibouti	3 April 1978
131	Grenada	7 September 1979
132	Nicaragua	13 September 1979
133	Lesotho	1 February 1980
134	Zimbabwe	20 February 1981
135	Oman	26 September 1985
136	Vanuatu	30 June 1986
137	Nauru	30 December 1987
138	Qatar	1 August 1988
139	Antigua and Barbuda	5 January 1990
—	State of Palestine	10 January 1990
140	Namibia	21 March 1990
141	Kiribati	5 September 1990
142	Bahrain	29 September 1990
143	Honduras	30 September 1990
144	South Korea	30 September 1990
145	Belize	25 June 1991
146	Brunei	1 October 1991
147	Latvia	4 October 1991
148	Lithuania	4 October 1991
149	Estonia	24 October 1991
150	Chile	26 December 1991
—	Ukraine (severed)	14 February 1992
151	South Africa	28 February 1992
152	Kyrgyzstan	20 March 1992
153	Uzbekistan	20 March 1992
154	Armenia	4 April 1992
155	Azerbaijan	4 April 1992
156	Moldova	6 April 1992
157	Tajikistan	8 April 1992
158	Turkmenistan	8 April 1992
159	Paraguay	14 May 1992
160	Croatia	25 May 1992
161	Slovenia	25 May 1992
162	El Salvador	3 June 1992
163	Belarus	25 June 1992
—	Georgia (severed)	1 July 1992
164	Marshall Islands	6 August 1992
165	Kazakhstan	22 October 1992
166	Slovakia	1 January 1993
167	Barbados	29 January 1993
168	Eritrea	24 May 1993
169	Malawi	2 November 1993
170	San Marino	30 September 1993
171	Liechtenstein	30 January 1994
172	North Macedonia	31 January 1994
173	Dominica	19 May 1995
174	Andorra	13 June 1995
175	Haiti	2 June 1996
176	Bosnia and Herzegovina	26 December 1996
—	Federated States of Micronesia (severed)	9 March 1999
177	Eswatini	19 October 1999
178	Timor-Leste	20 May 2002
179	Saint Vincent and the Grenadines	17 September 2002
180	Saint Kitts and Nevis	22 September 2003
181	Bahamas	14 January 2004
182	Saint Lucia	19 April 2004
183	Montenegro	26 June 2006
184	Monaco	11 July 2006
185	Palau	28 November 2006
—	Abkhazia	9 September 2008
—	South Ossetia	9 September 2008
—	Holy See	9 December 2009
186	South Sudan	22 August 2011
187	Tuvalu	25 October 2011

== Bilateral relations ==
=== Africa ===
Country	Formal relations began	Notes
Algeria		See Algeria–Russia relations: Russia has an Embassy in Algiers and a consulate in Annaba.; Algeria has an Embassy in Moscow.; Diplomatic relations between Algeria and the Soviet Union were established for the first time on 23 March 1962. The Soviet Union and Algeria engaged in cordial bilateral relations, due to their shared anti-colonial sentiments. From 1962 to 1989, the Soviet Union supplied more than $11 billion in arms to Algeria. Russia currently enjoys very warm relations with Algeria. The two countries signed a Strategic Partnership Declaration in 2001 aimed at strengthening military, economic, and political ties. Russia is still Algeria's largest supplier of arms, and the two countries have conducted multiple joint military exercises. The two countries also engage in bilateral investment, with frequent cooperation in the sectors of hydrocarbons and agriculture. When Algerian President Abdelmadjid Tebboune visited Russia in 2023, the two countries signed an Enhanced Strategic Partnership which further expanded avenues for cooperation.
Angola		See Angola–Russia relations or Angola–Soviet Union relations Russia has an embassy in Luanda. Angola has an embassy in Moscow and an honorary consulate in Saint Petersburg. Angola and the precursor to Russia, the Soviet Union, established relations upon Angola's independence.
Benin		See Benin–Russia relations Russia has an embassy in Cotonou, and Benin has an embassy in Moscow.
Botswana	6 March 1970	See Botswana–Russia relations Botswana and the Soviet Union initiated diplomatic relations on 6 March 1970. Despite its pro-Western orientation, Botswana participated in the 1980 Summer Olympics. The present-day relations between the two countries are described as friendly and long standing. In March, the two countries also celebrated the 35th anniversary of establishing diplomatic relations. According to the minister of Foreign Affairs, Russia was one of the first countries to establish full diplomatic relations with Botswana. Trade and economic cooperation between Russia and Botswana are stipulated by the Trade Agreement of 1987 and the Agreement on Economic and Technical Cooperation of 1988. The Government of the Russian Federation and the Government of the Republic of Botswana signed the Agreement on Cultural, Scientific and Educational Cooperation in September 1999. Russia and Botswana have had fruitful cooperation in a variety of fields, particularly in human resource development. And Russia is still offering more scholarship in key sectors such as health, which is currently experiencing a critical shortage of manpower. Botswana also is one of the countries where Russian citizens do not require a visa. Russia has an embassy in Gaborone, while Botswana covers Russia from its embassy in Stockholm (Sweden) and an honorary consulate in Moscow.
Burkina Faso	18 February 1967	See Burkina Faso – Russia relations Diplomatic relations between Burkina Faso and the Soviet Union were established for the first time on 18 February 1967. After the breakup of the Soviet Union, Burkina Faso recognized Russia as the USSR's successor. However financial reasons has shut the embassies between the two nations. In 1992, the embassy of the Russian Federation in Ouagadougou was closed, and in 1996, the embassy of Burkina Faso in Moscow was closed. While, after Ibrahim Traore rise in power, due Russia-Africa Summit 2023, Russia decided to reopen their embassy in Ouagadougou.
Burundi		See Burundi–Russia relations Russia has an embassy in Bujumbura. Burundi has an embassy in Moscow. Relations improved when Burundian relations with the west deteriorated. In recent years, Russia and Burundi consistently remains similar visions and collaboration in international arena, including UN framework.
Cameroon		See Cameroon–Russia relations Russia has an embassy in Yaoundé, and Cameroon has an embassy in Moscow. While, relations between two countries remains strong and deepen with high level trust.
Cape Verde		Russia is represented in Cape-Verde by its embassy in Praia.
Central African Republic		See Central African Republic–Russia relations In March 2018, Russia agreed to provide free military aid to the Central African Republic, sending small arms, ammunition, and 175 instructors to train the Central African Armed Forces. The advisers are believed to be members of the Wagner Group.
Democratic Republic of the Congo		See Democratic Republic of the Congo–Russia relations
Egypt	26 August 1943	See Egypt–Russia relations: Egypt has an embassy in Moscow.; Russia has an embassy in Cairo and a consulate-general in Alexandria.; Egypt enjoyed as the most important allies in many sphere, and major trade partners for Russia in recent years.
Eswatini		See Eswatini–Russia relations
Ethiopia	1943-4-21	See Ethiopia–Russia relations: Russia currently has an embassy in Addis Ababa.; Ethiopia has an embassy in Moscow. The Ethiopian ambassador to Russia is also accredited to Armenia, Azerbaijan, Belarus, Georgia, Kazakhstan, Kyrgyzstan, Moldova, Tajikistan, Turkmenistan, Ukraine, and Uzbekistan.; The history of this relationship has its origins in the 19th century. Russia supplied the mountain guns the Ethiopian army used in the Battle of Adwa.; More recently, the Soviet Union was a major source of military and economic aid under the Derg and during the People's Democratic Republic of Ethiopia.; See also Alexander Bulatovich; Relations are somewhat unsure owing to Russia's close ties with Ethiopia's neighboring rival, Sudan.
Eritrea	1943-4-21	See Eritrea–Russia relations: Russia has an embassy in Asmara.; Eritrea has an embassy in Moscow.
Gambia	1965-07-17	See Gambia–Russia relations Both countries have established diplomatic relations on 17 July 1965. Diplomatic relations were later established once again after the breakup of the Soviet Union. The Gambia has an embassy in Moscow. Russia is represented in the Gambia through its embassy in Dakar (Senegal).
Ghana		See Ghana–Russia relations Russia has an embassy in Accra, and Ghana has an embassy in Moscow.
Guinea-Bissau		See Guinea-Bissau–Russia relations Guinea-Bissau has an embassy in Moscow, and Russia has an embassy in Bissau.
Ivory Coast		See Ivory Coast–Russia relations Russia works on UN missions to help the people of Ivory Coast. The help is sometimes done from the Russian embassy in Abidjan, but is also done from the embassy in Accra, Ghana. From these point of view, Russia regarded the outcome of the extraordinary summit held in Dakar, Senegal, of the Economic Community for West African States.
Kenya		See Kenya–Russia relations: Russia has an embassy in Nairobi.; Kenya has an embassy in Moscow.
Liberia		Liberia and Russia renewed bilateral relations in March 2010 and cited a recent exploration of mine by a Russian company as a sign of future trade relations.
Libya		Main article: Libya–Russia relations Russia sharply criticised the NATO-led military intervention in the Libyan civil war, though it chose not to use its veto power on the United Nations Security Council to block it. On 27 May 2011, Russian President Dmitri Medvedev said that although Moscow opposed the military operations, it believed Gaddafi should leave power. In early June 2011, Russian envoy Mikhail Margelov was received in Benghazi, the de facto headquarters of the Libyan opposition. Margelov's stated objective was to broker a truce between anti-Gaddafi forces and the Gaddafi-led government. He recognized the council as Libya's sole legitimate representative, which it did on 1 September 2011.
Madagascar		See Madagascar–Russia relations The establishment of diplomatic relations between Madagascar and the Soviet Union started on 29 September 1972. During the 2009 Malagasy political crisis, Russia's Foreign Minister Sergey Lavrov stated that Russia is "concerned by the increased frequency of attempts on the African continent to resort to non-constitutional methods of solving internal political problems." He went on to say that, in addition to increasing economic and social problems, the use of force is of concern and runs counter to democratic principles, whilst affirming Russia's support of the African Union's position.: Madagascar has an embassy in Moscow.; Russia has an embassy in Antananarivo.
Mali		See Mali–Russia relations Russia has an embassy in Bamako, and Mali has an embassy in Moscow. Since Assimi Goïta took power via military coup in 2021, the Malian government has sought closer ties with Russia. The Russian government has provided economic and military support to Mali via arms transfers and trade. Despite denial from the Malian government, there is also overwhelming evidence supporting Wagner Group operations in Mali.
Mauritania		See Mauritania–Russia relations Russia has an embassy in Nouakchott, and Mauritania has an embassy in Moscow.
Mauritius	17 March 1968	See Mauritius–Russia relations The Soviet Union and Mauritius established diplomatic relations on 17 March 1968. Russia has an embassy in Port Louis, and Mauritius has an embassy in Moscow, which was opened in July 2003.
Morocco		See Morocco–Russia relations Russia has an embassy in Rabat, and a consular office in Casablanca. Morocco is represented in Russia by its embassy to Moscow. President Vladimir Putin had paid a visit to Morocco in September 2006 in order to boost economic and military ties between Russia and Morocco.
Mozambique	25 June 1975	See Mozambique–Russia relations Mozambique-Russia relations date back to the 1960s, when Russia began to support the struggle of Mozambique's Marxist-oriented FRELIMO party against Portuguese colonialism in the Mozambican War of Independence. Most leaders of the FRELIMO were trained in Moscow. Diplomatic relations were formally established on 25 June 1975, soon after Mozambique gained its independence from Portugal. In June 2007, both Russia and Mozambique signed an agreement on economic cooperation. Russia has an embassy in Maputo while Mozambique has an embassy in Moscow.
Namibia		See Namibia–Russia relations Namibia has an embassy to Russia in Moscow and Russia has an embassy to Namibia in Windhoek. Relations between Namibia and Russia were considered "excellent" in 2006 by then-Namibian Minister of Education Nangolo Mbumba, while Russia expressed a desire for even stronger relations, particularly in the economic field. Also in 2006, the Namibia-Russia Intergovernmental Commission on Trade and Economic Cooperation was officially opened during a visit by Russian Natural Resources Minister Yuri Trutnev to Windhoek. During said visit, the Minister said Russia was interested in investing in oil, hydro-electric power and tourism. In 2007, Russian Prime Minister Mikhail Fradkov held discussions with Namibian Deputy Prime Minister Nahas Angula and President Hifikepunye Pohamba in regards to the possibility of developing Namibia's significant uranium deposits with an aim towards creating a nuclear power plant in the country. In 2008, Trutnev returned to Namibia, this time to Swakopmund, to meet at the third annual Intergovernmental Commission. Top foreign ministry official Marco Hausiku and his deputy Lempy Lucas represented Namibia in discussions with Trutnev.
Niger		See Niger–Russia relations: Nigeria has an embassy in Moscow.; In April 2025, Russian Foreign Minister Sergey Lavrov announced that Russia would reopen its embassy in Niamey.
Nigeria	25 November 1960	See Nigeria–Russia relations: Nigeria has an embassy in Moscow.; Russia has an embassy in Abuja and a consulate-general in Lagos.
Senegal	14 June 1962	See Russia–Senegal relations Russia has an embassy in Dakar and Senegal has an embassy in Moscow. The Soviet Union established diplomatic relations with Senegal on 14 June 1962.
Seychelles	1976-06-30	See Russia–Seychelles relations Diplomatic relations between Seychelles and the Soviet Union were established on 30 June 1976, a day after the island nation gained its independence from the United Kingdom. Russia has an embassy in Victoria. Seychelles is represented in Russia through its embassy in Paris (France) and an honorary consulate in Saint Petersburg.
South Africa	1942	See Russia–South Africa relations: Russia has an embassy in Pretoria and a consulate-general in Cape Town.; South Africa has an embassy in Moscow.; South African Department of Foreign Affairs about the relation with Russia.
South Sudan	22 August 2011	See Russia–South Sudan relations
Sudan		See Russia–Sudan relations Russia has an embassy in Khartoum and Sudan has an embassy in Moscow. For decades, Russia and Sudan have maintained a strong economic and politically strategic partnership. Due to solidarity with both the United States and with the Soviet Union and with the allies of the two nations, Sudan declared neutrality and instead chose membership in the Non-Aligned Movement throughout the Cold War. Russo-Sudanese relations were minorly damaged when, in 1971 members of the Sudanese Communist Party attempted to assassinate then-president Gaafar Nimeiry, and Nimeiry pegged the blame on the USSR, thus enhancing Sudanese relations with the West, and were damaged again when Sudan supported the Mujahadeen in Afghanistan when the USSR invaded in 1979. Due to a common enemy, diplomatic cooperation between the two countries dramatically got back on track during the late 1990s and early 2000s, when Vladimir Putin was elected the President, and then the Prime Minister of Russia, and along with General Secretary of the Chinese Communist Party Hu Jintao opposed UN Peacekeepers in the War in Darfur. Russia strongly supports Sudan's territorial integrity and opposes the creation of an independent Darfurian state. Also, Russia is Sudan's strongest investment partner in Europe and political ally in Europe, and Russia has repeatedly and significantly regarded Sudan as an important global ally in the African continent. For decades there have been Sudanese collegians studying in Russian universities.
Tanzania	1961-01-11	See Russia–Tanzania relations Both countries have signed diplomatic missions on 11 December 1961 Russia has an embassy in Dar es Salaam, and Tanzania has an embassy in Moscow.
Tunisia	1956	See Russia–Tunisia relations Russia has an embassy in Tunis, and Tunisia has an embassy in Moscow.
Uganda		See Russia – Uganda relations Russia has an embassy in Kampala and Uganda has an embassy in Moscow.
Zambia		See Russia–Zambia relations: Start date: 1964; Russia has an embassy in Lusaka.; Zambia is represented in Russia by its embassy in Moscow.
Zimbabwe	1981-02-18	See Russia–Zimbabwe relations: Russia has a mission in Harare; Zimbabwe has an embassy in Moscow: Embassy of Zimbabwe, Moscow; Russia-Zimbabwe relations date back to January 1979, during the Rhodesian Bush War. The Soviet Union supported Joshua Nkomo's Zimbabwe African People's Union, and supplied them with arms; Robert Mugabe's attempts to gain Soviet support for his Zimbabwe African National Union were rebuffed, leading him to enter into relations with Soviet rival Beijing. After the end of the white regime in Zimbabwe, Robert Mugabe had strengthened his relations with both Beijing and Moscow as a result of intense western pressure on him. Russia maintains strong economic and political ties with Zimbabwe and both countries had vetoed the UN resolution imposing UN sanctions on Zimbabwe which was proposed by both the US and the UK on 12 July 2008.

=== Americas ===
Country	Formal relations began	Notes
Argentina	1885-10-22	See Argentina–Russia relations: Argentina has an embassy in Moscow.; Russia has an embassy in Buenos Aires.; List of Treaties ruling the relations Argentina and Russia (Argentine Foreign Ministry) (in Spanish)
Barbados	1993-01-29	The Russian Federation and Barbados established formal diplomatic relations on 29 January 1993. In 2018 both nations celebrated 25 years of diplomatic ties and pledged closer collaboration. The two nations also discussed cultural exchanges and Russia working with Barbados' light oil and gas industry. And possible scholarships to Russian schools. In 2022 the Russian Foreign Minister met his counterpart in Barbados to discuss current relations and explored a future agenda with the nation including among other things the conclusion of a visa waiver agreement between both nations.: Russia is represented in Barbados, through its embassy in Georgetown, Guyana.
Bolivia		See Bolivia–Russia relations With Bolivia the focus on relations with Russia is mainly economic, as opposed to political and strategic, as an agreement to invest in Bolivia's natural gas fields shows. It is seen to "help Latin America...[as it] expands Latin America's economic opportunities, diversifies its relationships...that's healthy." 2008 saw, as a first step to re-establish ties with Russia, the Bolivian government had plans to purchase a small batch of helicopters. Ambassador Leonid Golubev told The Associated Press that he would like to see Russia's ties to Bolivia one day "approach the level" of its growing partnership with Venezuela. In 2009 amid improving relations between the two countries Bolivia and Russia signed various agreements pertaining to energy and military ties, mining activities and illegal drug eradication.: Bolivia has an embassy in Moscow.; Russia has an embassy in La Paz.
Brazil	3 October 1828	See Brazil–Russia relations Brazil–Russia relations have seen a significant improvement in recent years, characterized by an increasing commercial trade and cooperation in military and technology segments. Today, Brazil shares an important alliance with the Russian Federation, with partnerships in areas such as space and military technologies, and telecommunications.: Brazil has an embassy in Moscow.; Russia has an embassy in Brasília and consulates-general in Rio de Janeiro and São Paulo.
Canada	1942-06-12	See Canada–Russia relations Canada and Russia benefit from extensive cooperation on trade and investment, energy, democratic development and governance, security and counter-terrorism, northern issues, and cultural and academic exchanges.: Canada has an embassy in Moscow.; Russia has an embassy in Ottawa and consulates-general in Montreal and Toronto.
Chile	1944-12-11	See Chile–Russia relations: Chile has an embassy in Moscow and two honorary consulates in Saint Petersburg and in Vladivostok.; Russia has an embassy in Santiago.
Colombia	1935	See Colombia–Russia relations: Colombia has an embassy in Moscow.; Russia has an embassy in Bogotá.
Costa Rica		See Costa Rica–Russia relations Costa Rica has an embassy in Moscow. Russia has an embassy in San José. Holders of a Russian passport need a visa authorized by Costa Rica, or alternatively Costa Rican authorities will accept Russian nationals with a visa stamp for the European Union, Canada, USA, South Korea, or Japan valid for 90 days after arrival; with a tourist visa, Russians can stay in Costa Rica for a maximum of 90 days. In order to get a tourist visa, the person needs to apply for it in the closest Costa Rican embassy to where the person is living. The person must have a valid passport and either have an invitation letter or a bank statement with enough money to survive the length of the stay in Costa Rica, plus proof of onward travel (ticket to exit Costa Rica & legal ability to travel to the destination stated on the ticket). Holders of a Costa Rican passport also need a visa from Russian authorities.
Cuba		See Cuba–Russia relations or Cuba–Soviet Union relations Relations between the two countries suffered somewhat during the Boris Yeltsin administration, as Cuba was forced to look for new major allies, such as China, after the dissolution of the Soviet Union. Relations improved when Vladimir Putin was elected as the new Russian President. Putin, and later Dmitry Medvedev, emphasized re-establishing strong relations with old Soviet allies. In 2008, Medvedev visited Havana and Raúl Castro made a week-long trip to Moscow. In that same year the two governments signed multiple economic agreements and Russia sent tons of humanitarian aid to Cuba. Cuba, meanwhile, gave staunch political support for Russia during the 2008 South Ossetia war. Relations between the two nations are currently at a post-Soviet high, and talks about potentially re-establishing a Russian military presence in Cuba are even beginning to surface.
Dominica	1995	Dominica and Russia have established diplomatic relations on 19 May 1995. In April 2018, Dominica appointed a resident ambassador to Russia.
Ecuador		See Ecuador–Russia relations Ecuador has an embassy in Moscow. Russia has an embassy in Quito.
Grenada		During the New Jewel Movement, the Soviet Union tried to make the island of Grenada function as a Soviet base, and also by getting supplies from Cuba. In October 1983, during the United States invasion of Grenada, US President Ronald Reagan maintained that US Marines arrived on the island of Grenada, which was considered a Soviet-Cuban ally that would export communist revolution throughout the Caribbean. In November, at a joint hearing of Congressional Subcommittee, it was told that Grenada could be used as a staging area for subversion of the nearby countries, for intersection of shipping lanes, and for the transit of troops and supplies from Cuba to Africa, and from Eastern Europe and Libya to Central America. In December, the State Department published a preliminary report on Grenada, in which it was claimed as an "Island of Soviet Internationalism". When the US Marines landed on the island, they discovered a large amount of documents, which included agreements between the Soviet Government, and the New Jewel Movement, recorded minutes of the Committee meetings, and reports from the Grenadian embassy in Moscow. Diplomatic relations between Grenada and the Soviet Union were severed in 1983 by the Governor General of Grenada. Eventually in 2002, Grenada re-established diplomatic relations with the newly formed Russian Federation.
Guyana	17 December 1970	See Guyana–Russia relations: Both countries established diplomatic relations on 17 December 1970.; Guyana is represented in Russia by its High Commission in London, United Kingdom.; Russia is represented in Guyana by its embassy in Georgetown.
Mexico	1 December 1890	See Mexico–Russia relations: Mexico has an embassy in Moscow.; Russia has an embassy in Mexico City.
Nicaragua	December 1944	See Nicaragua–Russia relations Both countries signed diplomatic missions on 18 October 1979, a few months after the Sandinista revolution. President Vladimir Putin visited Nicaragua on 12 July 2014.: Nicaragua has an embassy in Moscow.; Russia has an embassy in Managua.
Panama	21 November 1903	See Panama–Russia relations: Panama has an embassy in Moscow.; Russia has an embassy in Panama city.
Paraguay	14 May 1992	See Paraguay–Russia relations: Both countries established diplomatic relations on 14 May 1992.; Paraguay has an embassy in Moscow.; Russia is represented in Paraguay through its embassy in Buenos Aires (Argentina) and an honorary consulate in Asunción.; On 13 September 2007, Russia's acting foreign minister, Sergei Lavrov, declared to soon open a resident embassy in Paraguay's capital.; Paraguayan Ministry of Foreign Relations
Suriname		The nations have begun discussing cooperation in the areas of agriculture, fishing, shipbuilding, education, along with trade. In October 2013, the Surinamese foreign minister, Yldiz Pollack-Beighle visited Moscow for talks on concluding military and joint law enforcement training.
Trinidad and Tobago	6 June 1974	See Russia–Trinidad and Tobago relations Both countries have signed diplomatic missions on 6 June 1974. Russia is represented in Trinidad and Tobago through a non-resident embassy in Georgetown (Guyana). Both countries have interests with each other since the Soviet Union. In August 1992, Trinidad recognized Russia as the USSR's successor. In 2004, Sergey Lavrov and Knowlson Gift signed the protocol on the political consultations between the two Ministries. In April 2005 the Chamber of Commerce and Industry of the Russian Federation and the Chamber of Industry and Commerce of the Republic of Trinidad and Tobago signed the cooperation agreement. In 2004, the Russian Cossack folk dance had nine concerts in Port of Spain, San Fernando, Couva, and Tobago.
United States		See Russia–United States relations: Russia has an embassy in Washington, D.C. and has consulates-general in Houston and New York City.; United States has an embassy in Moscow and consulates-general in Vladivostok and Yekaterinburg.
Uruguay		See Russia–Uruguay relations Russia has an embassy in Montevideo and Uruguay has an embassy in Moscow. Russia is looking for cooperation with Uruguay in the field of nuclear energy, the Russian ambassador to Latin America said: "Our countries could maintain cooperation in the sphere of nuclear energy although Uruguay's legislation bans the use of nuclear energy". The diplomat said Uruguayan officials had shown interest in a floating nuclear power plant, when the project's presentation took place at the Russian Embassy recently. The first floating plant will have capacity of 70 MW of electricity, and about 300 MW of thermal power. The cost of the first plant is estimated at US$400 million, but could later be reduced to $240 million. This year marks the 150th anniversary of diplomatic relations between Russia and Uruguay.
Venezuela		See Russia–Venezuela relations: Russia has an embassy in Caracas.; Venezuela has an embassy in Moscow.

=== Asia ===
Country	Formal relations began	Notes
Abkhazia	9 September 2008	See Abkhazia–Russia relations Abkhazia–Russia relations is the bilateral relationship between the Republic of Abkhazia and the Russian Federation. Russia recognised Abkhazia on 26 August 2008, following the August 2008 Russo-Georgian War. Abkhazia and Russia established diplomatic relations on 9 September 2008.
Afghanistan		See Afghanistan–Russia relations Afghanistan and Russia have shared a highly varied relationship from the mid-19th century to the modern day. For decades, Russia and Britain struggled for influence in Afghanistan, strategically positioned between their two empires, in what became known as "The Great Game". Following the 1917 Bolshevik Revolution, the new Soviet Union established more cordial relations with Afghanistan, and in 1919 became the first country to recognise Afghan sovereignty. Relations between the two nations became complicated following the 1978 communist coup known as the Saur Revolution. The new communist Democratic Republic of Afghanistan was highly dependent on the Soviet Union, and the Soviet support for the widely disliked communist regime, and the ensuing Soviet–Afghan War, led to a great hatred for the Soviets in much of the Afghan population. The Soviet Armed Forces occupied Afghanistan in the face of a bitter ten-year insurgency before withdrawing in 1989. Even following the withdrawal of Soviet forces, the Soviet Union provided massive support to the embattled DRA government, reaching a value of $3 billion a year in 1990. However, this relationship dissolved in 1991 along with the dissolution of the Soviet Union itself. On 13 September 1991, the Soviet government, now dominated by Boris Yeltsin, agreed with the United States on a mutual cut off of military aid to both sides in the Afghan civil war beginning on 1 January 1992. The post-coup Soviet government then attempted to develop political relations with the Afghan resistance. In mid-November it invited a delegation of the resistance's Afghanistan Interim Government (AIG) to Moscow where the Soviets agreed that a transitional government should prepare Afghanistan for national elections. The Soviets did not insist that Najibullah or his colleagues participate in the transitional process. Having been cut adrift both materially and politically, Najibullah's faction torn government began to fall apart, and the city of Kabul fell to the Mujahideen factions in April 1992. In 2009, Russian President Dmitry Medvedev announced that he wanted to be more involved in Afghanistan, supporting development of infrastructure and the army. This came as relations between Afghan President Karzai and American President Obama reached a low. On 9 April 2022, the Russian Ministry of Foreign Affairs accredited Taliban appointee Jamal Nasir Gharwal as charge d'affaires of the Afghan Embassy in Moscow.
Armenia	3 April 1992	See Armenia–Russia relations Armenia's most notable recent foreign policy success came with 29 August treaty with Russia on friendship, cooperation and mutual assistance, in which Moscow committed itself to the defense of Armenia should it be attacked by a third party. Russia is the key regional security player, and has proved a valuable historical ally for Armenia. Although it appeared as a response to Aliyev's US trip, the treaty had probably long been under development. However, it is clear from the wider context of Armenian foreign policy that—while Yerevan welcomes the Russian security guarantee—the country does not want to rely exclusively on Moscow, nor to become part of a confrontation between Russian and US-led alliances in the Transcaucasus. Relations between Armenia and Russia have recently deteriorated significantly due to the Second Nagorno-Karabakh War, the September 2022 Armenia–Azerbaijan clashes, 2022 Russia's invasion of Ukraine, the 2022–2023 blockade of Nagorno-Karabakh, 2023 Azerbaijan's offensive in Nagorno-Karabakh, the exodus of Nagorno-Karabakh Armenians, and Armenia's application for EU membership.: Armenia has an embassy in Moscow and general consulates in Rostov-on-Don and Saint Petersburg and honorary consulates in Kaliningrad and Sochi.; Russia has an embassy in Yerevan and general consulate in Gyumri.; Russia recognized the Armenian Genocide in 1995.; Armenia joined the Russian-led Eurasian Economic Union in 2015.; It is estimated that there are between 2,500,000 and 2,900,000 Armenians in Russia.
Azerbaijan	4 April 1992	See Azerbaijan–Russia relations: Russia has an embassy in Baku.; Azerbaijan has an embassy in Moscow and consulate-general in Saint Petersburg. Azerbaijan also announced that it will open another consulate-general in Yekaterinburg.
Bahrain		See Bahrain–Russia relations Russia has an embassy in Manama, and Bahrain has an embassy in Moscow.
Bangladesh	1971	See Bangladesh–Russia relations
Cambodia	13 May 1956	See Cambodia–Russia relations: The relations between both countries were strong since the Soviet era.; Russia has an embassy in Phnom Penh.; Cambodia has an embassy in Moscow.; Both countries are full members of the East Asia Summit.
China	1949	See China–Russia relations: China has an embassy in Moscow and consulates-general in Irkutsk, Kazan, Khabarovsk, Saint Petersburg, Vladivostok and Yekaterinburg.; Russia has an embassy in Beijing and consulates-general in Guangzhou, Hong Kong, Shanghai and Shenyang.
Georgia	1 July 1992 (Suspended 2 September 2008)	See Georgia–Russia relations On 29 August 2008, in the aftermath of the 2008 South Ossetia war, Deputy Foreign Minister Grigol Vashadze announced that Georgia had broken diplomatic relations with Russia. He also said that Russian diplomats must leave Georgia, and that no Georgian diplomat would remain in Russia, while only consular relations would be maintained. Russian foreign ministry spokesman Andrei Nesterenko said that Russia regretted this step.
India		See India–Russia relations During the Cold War, India and the Soviet Union enjoyed a strong strategic, military, economic and diplomatic relationship. After the collapse of the USSR, India improved its relations with the West but it continued its close relations with Russia. India is the second-largest market for the Russian arms industry. In 2004, more than 70% of the Indian Military's hardware came from Russia, making Russia the chief supplier of arms. Since 2000 and the visit of Vladimir Putin in India, there has been an Indo-Russian Strategic Partnership also referred as "special and privileged strategic partnership" .: India has an embassy in Moscow and two consulates-general (in Saint Petersburg and Vladivostok).; Russia has an embassy in New Delhi and six consulates-general (in Chennai, Goa, Hyderabad, Kolkata, Mumbai, Thiruvananthapuram.
Indonesia	February 1950	See Indonesia–Russia relations Russia is represented in Indonesia especially an embassy in Jakarta. Russian ambassador to Indonesia Ludmilla Georgievna serves as the first female Russian ambassador to Indonesia, since 2018. Yudhoyono meeting Russian president Vladimir Putin to sign a defense deal in Jakarta, September 2007. The Soviet Union established diplomatic relations with Indonesia in 1950 and was one of the very few countries to recognize Indonesia's independence from the Netherlands after World War II. Early in the Cold War, both countries had very strong relations, with Indonesian president Sukarno visiting Moscow and Soviet leader Nikita Khrushchev visiting Jakarta. When Sukarno was overthrown by General Suharto, relations between the two states were significantly deteriorated, likely due to Indonesia's enforced anti-communist policy under Suharto following the 1965 unrest. Relations between the Soviet Union and Indonesia grew tense for 20 years, but a thaw began when Gorbachev came to power. However, unlike the relations with China during Suharto's rule, the diplomatic relations were not suspended and remained intact. Indonesia's negative views of the Soviet Union had significantly increased following the 1979 Soviet-Afghan War, with many Indonesians claiming it as a "communist crime against Muslims". During this time, Indonesia is also one of many countries that boycotted the 1980 Moscow Olympics. Indonesian President Suharto visited the Soviet Union in September 1989 for the first time since taking power more than two decades prior. Official talks between Suharto and Soviet leader Mikhail Gorbachev taking place in the Kremlin. The USSR under Gorbachev began to develop closer ties with Indonesia alongside other Southeast Asian countries, and relations between the two states were improving once again since the formation of the modern-day Russian Federation. Under Boris Yeltsin and later Vladimir Putin, relations were generally stable and continued until the invasion of Ukraine.
Iran		See Iran–Russia relations Relations between Russia and Persia (pre-1935 Iran) have a long history, as they officially commenced in 1521 with the Safavids in power. Past and present contact between Russia and Iran has always been complicated and multi-faceted, often wavering between collaboration and rivalry. The two nations have a long history of geographic, economic, and socio-political interaction. Their mutual relations have often been turbulent, and dormant at other times. Since 2019 however, their relationship has drastically improved and Russia and Iran are now strategic allies and form an axis in the Caucasus alongside Armenia. Iran has its embassy in Moscow and consulate generals in the cities of Kazan and Astrakhan. Russia has its embassy in Tehran, and consulate generals in the cities of Rasht and Isfahan.
Iraq	9 September 1944	See Iraq–Russia relations: The Soviet Union established diplomatic relations with the Kingdom of Iraq on 9 September 1944.
Israel	17 May 1948	See Israel–Russia relations and Russian language in Israel: in November 1947, the Soviet Union, together with the other Soviet bloc countries voted in favor of the United Nations Partition Plan for Palestine, which paved the way for the creation of the State of Israel. On 17 May 1948, three days after Israel declared its independence, the Soviet Union officially granted de jure recognition of Israel, becoming the second country to recognise the Jewish state (preceded by the United States' de facto recognition) and the first country to grant Israel de jure recognition.
Japan	7 February 1855	See Japan–Russia relations or Japan–Soviet Union relations Japan's relations with Russia are hampered by the two sides' inability to resolve their territorial dispute over the four islands that make up the Northern Territories (Kuriles), which the Soviet Union seized towards the end of World War II. The stalemate has prevented conclusion of a peace treaty formally ending the war. The dispute over the Kuril Islands exacerbated the Japan–Russo relations when the Japanese government published a new guideline for school textbooks on 16 July 2008 to teach Japanese children that their country has sovereignty over the Kuril Islands. The Russian public was outraged by the action. the Foreign Minister of Russia criticized the action while reaffirming its sovereignty over the islands.: Japan has an embassy in Moscow and consulates-general in Khabarovsk, Saint Petersburg, Vladivostok and Yuzhno-Sakhalinsk.; Russia has an embassy in Tokyo and consulates-general in Niigata, Osaka and Sapporo.; Japan is on Russia's list of unfriendly countries
Jordan	20 August 1963	See Jordan–Russia relations Russia has an embassy in Amman, while Jordan has an embassy in Moscow. Both countries had established diplomatic relations on 20 August 1963.
Kazakhstan		See Kazakhstan–Russia relations Kazakhstan has an embassy in Moscow, consulate-general in Saint Petersburg, Astrakhan and Omsk. Russia has an embassy in Astana and consulates in Almaty and Uralsk. Diplomatic relations between Russia and Kazakhstan have fluctuated since the fall of the Soviet Union but both nations remain particularly strong partners in regional affairs and major supporters of the Collective Security Treaty Organization, Shanghai Cooperation Organisation and Eurasian Economic Union. Kazakhstani-Russian relations have been strained at times by Astana's military and economic cooperation with the United States as well as negotiations over Russia's continued use of the Baikonur Cosmodrome, however the two nations retain high-level military and economic cooperation perhaps second among former Soviet states only to that between Russia and Belarus. Kazakhstan sells oil and gas to Russia at a significantly reduced rate and Russian businesses are heavily invested in Kazakhstan's economy.
Kyrgyzstan		See Kyrgyzstan–Russia relations Whereas the other Central Asian republics have sometimes complained of Russian interference, Kyrgyzstan has more often wished for more attention and support from Moscow than it has been able to obtain. For all the financial support that the world community has offered, Kyrgyzstan remains economically dependent on Russia, both directly and through Kazakhstan. In early 1995, Askar Akayev, the then President of Kyrgyzstan, attempted to sell Russian companies controlling shares in the republic's twenty-nine largest industrial plants, an offer that Russia refused.
Laos		See Laos–Russia relations: Laos has an embassy in Moscow.; Russia has an embassy in Vientiane.
Lebanon		See Lebanon–Russia relations: The "Artillery Square" in Beirut witnessed battles involving the Russian naval forces that were brought to the port of "St. George" to fight alongside the people who rose up against the Turkish rule. That was in 1773. What was the uprising of the people at that time as resistance to the "Ottoman occupation". The naval forces set up their artillery at Beirut Square, which still bears the name "Artillery Square" and buried its soldiers who fought the Turks with the Lebanese soldiers in the cemetery of the Orthodox Church of St.Meter in Achrafieh.; Diplomatic relations between the two countries began even before the Lebanese independence. In 1839, Russia opened its first consulate in Beirut.; The Soviet Union established diplomatic relations with Lebanon on 3 August 1944. Over the years, the two countries signed several agreements, including an agreement on trade and payments (30 April 1954 and 16 July 1970), on air traffic (8 February 1966), on cooperation in the tourism industry (8 June 1970), on procedures for forwarding of diplomatic mail without the escort of diplomatic couriers (2 February 1962, and 15–22 February 1971); At 1946, the Soviet Union, the first country in the world for the first time in the history of the UN veto-wielding to support Lebanon and Syria's total independence.; Lebanon has an embassy in Moscow.; Russia has an embassy in Beirut.
Malaysia	3 April 1967	See Malaysia–Russia relations Russia has an embassy in Kuala Lumpur, and Malaysia has an embassy in Moscow.
Mongolia	5 November 1921	See Mongolia–Russia relations Relations between Mongolia and the Russian Federation have been traditionally strong since the Communist era, when Soviet Russia was the closest ally of the Mongolian People's Republic. Russia has an embassy in Ulaanbaatar and two consulate generals (in Darkhan and Erdenet). Mongolia has an embassy in Moscow, three consulate generals (in Irkutsk, Kyzyl and Ulan Ude), and a branch in Yekaterinburg. Both countries are full members of the Organization for Security and Co-operation in Europe (Russia is a participating state, while Mongolia is a partner). After the disintegration of the former Soviet Union, Mongolia developed relations with the new independent states. Links with Russia and other republics were essential to contribute to stabilisation of the Mongolian economy. The primary difficulties in developing fruitful coordination occurred because these new states were experiencing the same political and economic restructuring as Mongolia. Despite these difficulties, Mongolia and Russia successfully negotiated both a 1991 Joint Declaration of Cooperation and a bilateral trade agreement. This was followed by a 1993 Treaty of Friendship and Cooperation establishing a new basis of equality in the relationship. Mongolian President Bagabandi visited Moscow in 1999, and Russian President Vladimir Putin visited Mongolia in 2000 in order to sign the 25-point Ulaanbaatar Declaration, reaffirming Mongol-Russian friendship and cooperation on numerous economic and political issues.
Myanmar		See Myanmar–Russia relations China and Russia once vetoed a U.N. Security Council resolution designed to punish Myanmar. Relations improved even more when relations with the west deteriorated, following the Rohingya crisis.
Nepal	1956	See Nepal–Russia relations Nepal and the Soviet Union had established diplomatic relations in 1956. After the collapse of the Soviet Union, Nepal extended full diplomatic recognition to the Russian Federation as its legal successor. Since then numerous bilateral meetings have taken place between both sides. Since 1992 numerous Nepalese students have gone to Russia for higher studies on a financial basis. In October 2005 the Foreign ministers of both countries met to discuss cooperation on a variety of issues including political, economic, military, educational, and cultural. Both countries maintain embassies in each other's capitals. Russia has an embassy in Kathmandu while Nepal has an embassy in Moscow.
North Korea	1948	See North Korea–Russia relations North Korean embassy in Moscow, Russia. Russian embassy in Pyongyang. Russia–DPRK relations are determined by Russia's strategic interests in Korea and the goal of preserving peace and stability in the Korean peninsula.
Pakistan	1948	See Pakistan–Russia relations Relations between these two countries have been strained in the past, because of Pakistan's close ties to America and its support for the Afghan rebels during the invasion by the USSR. However, the relations had improved since 1999 and become cordial in 2014. The Russian Army started their first ever joint-drill in 2016.
Palestine	1974	See Palestine-Soviet Union relations and Palestine-Russia relations The bilateral relations between the State of Palestine and Russia (and before 1991, the Soviet Union) have a complex history, deeply interwoven with Russian and Soviet relations with the Israeli enterprise, Palestinian nationalism, and Third World national liberation movements. Between 1956 and 1990, Soviet–Palestinian relations were part of the then-ongoing Soviet–American confrontation. Bilateral relations between Palestine and the Soviet Union were formally established in 1974. The PLO was recognized as the sole legitimate representative of Palestine that same year.
Philippines	2 June 1976	See Philippines–Russia relations
Qatar		See Qatar–Russia relations
Saudi Arabia	1926	See Russia–Saudi Arabia relations: Russia has an embassy in Riyadh.; Saudi Arabia has an embassy in Moscow.
Singapore	1 June 1968	See Russia–Singapore relations: Singapore maintains an embassy in Moscow and Russia has an embassy in Singapore.; Singapore and the Soviet Union (now Russia) entered into full diplomatic relations on 1 June 1968. The two nations engaged in trade and economic cooperation. After the start of Vladimir Putin's term, Singapore and Russia strengthened ties, participating in a number of regional meetings such as the ASEAN-Russia Summit and the ASEAN Regional Forum. Both Singapore and Russia are members of APEC.
South Korea	30 September 1990	See Russia–South Korea relations: Russian embassy in Seoul and a consulate-general in Busan.; South Korean embassy in Moscow and consulates-general in Irkutsk, Saint Petersburg, Vladivostok and a consular office in Yuzhno-Sakhalinsk.; South Korea is on Russia's list of unfriendly countries
South Ossetia	9 September 2008	See Russia–South Ossetia relations Russia and South Ossetia established diplomatic relations on 9 September 2008, when Russian Foreign Minister Sergey Lavrov and South Ossetian Minister of Foreign Affairs Murat Dzhioyev exchanged notes at the Russian Foreign Ministry in Moscow. On 25 September 2008, President Medvedev signed an ukaz appointing the first Russian Ambassador to South Ossetia, Elbrus Kargiyev, who presented his Letters of Credence to South Ossetian president Eduard Kokoity on 16 December 2008. Dmitry Medoyev, the plenipotentiary representative of the president of Republic of South Ossetia to Russia was appointed by Eduard Kokoity as South Ossetia's first ambassador to Russia on 13 January 2009. Medoyev presented his credentials to Russian president Dmitry Medvedev on 16 January 2009. Russian prime minister Vladimir Putin issued a directive to set up a Russian embassy in South Ossetia in 2009.
Sri Lanka		See Russia–Sri Lanka relations: During the war between the Sri Lanka Armed Forces (Government of Sri Lanka) and Tamil Tigers, Russia helped Sri Lanka by providing education on battle field tactics to Sri Lanka Army.; Sri Lanka also reacted in favor of Russia during its invasion of Ukraine, and acknowledged the concerns of Russia as justifiable.; Russia has an embassy in Colombo. Sri Lanka has an embassy in Moscow.
Syria		See Russia–Syria relations Russia has an embassy in Damascus and a consulate in Aleppo, and Syria has an embassy in Moscow. As with most of the Arab countries, Russia enjoys a historically strong and stable friendly relationship with Syria. Since 1971, Russia has leased port facilities in Tartus for its naval fleet. Between 1992 and 2008 these facilities were much in disrepair, however, works have commenced concurrent with the 2008 South Ossetia war to improve the port's facilities to support an increased Mediterranean presence of the Russian Navy. Russia is believed to have sent Syria dozens of Iskander missiles. Russia has been strongly supporting Syria in the Syrian civil war, especially since the start of an air campaign in 2015.
Tajikistan		See Russia–Tajikistan relations Until 2005, Russia had 11,000 border guards manning the Tajik frontier with Afghanistan. In September 2012, and after months of negotiating, Russia and Tajikistan have reached an agreement on what Russia will pay for its bases in Tajikistan and extended the lease to 20 or 29 years. The bases are used for 9,000 Russian troops of the 201st Motor Rifle Division. The new deal with Tajikistan makes it worthwhile for Russia to upgrade the four army camps and one air base they occupy. To get the long lease, Russia agreed to sell Tajikistan weapons and military equipment at a sharp discount and train Tajik officers in Russian schools, for free, for the duration of the deal. Tajikistan also promises to help keep the heroin out of Russia.
Thailand	1941	See Russia–Thailand relations Russia has an embassy in Bangkok and three honorary consulates in Phuket, Pattaya and Koh Samui. Thailand has an embassy in Moscow and two honorary consulates in Saint Petersburg and Vladivostok.
Timor-Leste		See Russia–Timor-Leste relations Russia was one of the first countries to recognise Timor-Leste's independence and took part in nearly all UN aid programs, providing food and relief personnel, including civil and transport aviation pilots. After the shooting of José Ramos-Horta (former president of Timor-Leste), the Russian ministry said; "The Russian side expresses its concern over the attempt on the life of the Timor-Leste president, and hopes political stability in Timor-Leste will be maintained, as a fundamental condition for a successful solution to the complicated problems it is facing. And in the interests of strengthening national unity and ensuring social and economic development." Russia is represented in Timor-Leste through its embassy in Jakarta (Indonesia).
Turkey		See Russia–Turkey relations: Russia has an embassy in Ankara and consulate-general in Antalya, Istanbul and Trabzon.; Turkey has an embassy in Moscow and consulate-general in Kazan, Novorossiysk and Saint Petersburg.
Turkmenistan		See Russia–Turkmenistan relations: Russia has an embassy in Ashgabat and a consulate-general in Türkmenbaşy.; Turkmenistan has an embassy in Moscow.; Recently, Russian-Turkmenistan relations have revolved around Russia's efforts to secure natural gas export deals from Turkmenistan. Russia is competing with China, the European Union, India and the United States for access to Turkmenistan's rich supply of hydrocarbons. The two countries often lock horns over price negotiations for gas exports to Russia. Turkmen president Gurbanguly Berdimuhamedow has agreed to help supply and expand the Russian-backed Pricaspiysky pipeline, however no action has yet occurred towards this goal.
United Arab Emirates	December 1971	See Russia–United Arab Emirates relations: Russia has an embassy in Abu Dhabi and a consulate-general in Dubai.; United Arab Emirates has an embassy in Moscow.
Uzbekistan	1992	See Russia–Uzbekistan relations: Uzbekistan has an embassy in Moscow; Russia has an embassy in Tashkent.; Uzbekistan was once a former Soviet Socialist republic. It still has strong ties to Russia and the West.; In the aftermath of the May 2005 unrest, Uzbekistan demanded that the United States leave the base at Karshi-Khanabad.; In November 2005, both presidents Islam Karimov and Vladimir Putin had signed a mutual cooperation agreement in Moscow.; Uzbekistan
Vietnam	30 January 1950	See Russia–Vietnam relations: On 30 January 1950 the Union of Soviet Socialist Republics established an embassy to North Vietnam. The USSR was traditionally one of Vietnam's strongest allies.

=== Europe ===
Country	Formal relations began	Notes
European Union		Main article: Russia–European Union relations: The European Union is on Russia's list of unfriendly countries
Albania	7 April 1924	See Albania–Russia relations: Albania has an embassy in Moscow.; Russia has an embassy in Tirana.; Albania–Soviet Union relations (7 April 1924 with Soviet Union); Albania is on Russia's list of unfriendly countries
Austria		See Austria–Russia relations: See Embassy of Austria in Moscow; See Embassy of Russia in Vienna; See Russians in Austria
Belarus		See Belarus–Russia relations The introduction of free trade between Russia and Belarus in mid-1995 led to a spectacular growth in bilateral trade, which was only temporarily reversed during the 1998 Russian financial crisis. President Alexander Lukashenko sought to develop a closer relationship with Russia. The framework for the Union of Russia and Belarus was set out in the Treaty On the Formation of a Community of Russia and Belarus (1996), the Treaty on Russia-Belarus Union, the Union Charter (1997), and the Treaty of the Formation of a Union State (1999). The integration treaties contained commitments to monetary union, equal rights, single citizenship, and a common defence and foreign policy.
Belgium		See Belgium–Russia relations Russia has an embassy in Brussels and a consulate-general in Antwerp, whilst Belgium has an embassy in Moscow and an honorary consulate in Saint Petersburg.
Bosnia and Herzegovina		See Bosnia and Herzegovina–Russia relations: Bosnia and Herzegovina has an embassy in Moscow.; Russia has an embassy in Sarajevo.; Bosnia is one of the countries where Russia has contributed troops for the NATO-led stabilization force. Others were sent to Kosovo and Serbia.
Bulgaria	1879-07-07	see Bulgaria–Russia relations: Bulgaria has an embassy in Moscow and 3 consulates general (in Saint Petersburg, Novosibirsk and Yekaterinburg).; Russia has an embassy in Sofia and 2 consulates general (in Ruse and Varna).; Russia was the first country to recognize Bulgaria, and greatly helped Bulgaria in its war of independence from Ottoman Turkey.
Croatia	1992-05-25	See Croatia–Russia relations: Croatia has an embassy in Moscow and an honorary consulate in Kaliningrad.; Russia has an embassy in Zagreb.; Croatia is on Russia's list of unfriendly countries; Croatian Ministry of Foreign Affairs: list of bilateral treaties with Russia
Czech Republic		See Czech Republic–Russia relations: Czech republic is on an 'unfriendly states list'.; Russia also has further reduced its oil deliveries to the Czech Republic.; The Czech Republic has an embassy in Moscow, and two consulate generals (in Saint Petersburg and Yekaterinburg).; The Russian Federation has an embassy in Prague, and two consulate generals in (Brno and Karlovy Vary).
Denmark	8 November 1493	See Denmark–Russia relations: Russia has an embassy in Copenhagen.; Denmark has an embassy in Moscow, - a consulate-general in Saint Petersburg.; Denmark is on Russia's list of unfriendly countries
Estonia	2 February 1920	See Estonia–Russia relations and Chechen–Estonia relations Russia recognised Estonia via the Tartu Peace Treaty on 2 February 1920. Russian-Estonian relations were re-established in January 1991, when presidents Boris Yeltsin of RSFSR and Arnold Rüütel of the Republic of Estonia met in Tallinn and signed a treaty governing the relations of the two countries after the anticipated independence of Estonia from the Soviet Union. The treaty guaranteed the right to freely choose their citizenship for all residents of the former Estonian SSR. Russia re-recognised the Republic of Estonia on 24 August 1991 after the failed Soviet coup attempt, as one of the first countries to do so. The Soviet Union recognised the independence of Estonia on 6 September. Estonia's ties with Boris Yeltsin weakened since the Russian leader's initial show of solidarity with the Baltic states in January 1991. Issues surrounding the withdrawal of Russian troops from the Baltic republics and Estonia's denial of automatic citizenship to persons who settled in Estonia in 1941-1991 and offspring ranked high on the list of points of contention.: The Estonian parliament in October 2022 voted in favour of officially recognising Russia as a terrorist state.
Finland		Main article: Finland–Russia relations Embassy of Finland in Moscow, Russia. Embassy of Russia in Helsinki, Finland.: Russia has an embassy in Helsinki, and a consulate-general in Mariehamn.; Finland has an embassy in Moscow.; Finland is on Russia's list of unfriendly countries; Finland was a part of the Russian Empire for 108 years, after being annexed from the Swedish empire. Discontent with Russian rule, Finnish national identity, and World War I eventually caused Finland to break away from Russia, taking advantage of the fact that Russia was withdrawing from World War I and a revolution was starting in earnest. Following the Finnish Civil War and October revolution, Russians were virtually equated with Communists and due to official hostility to Communism, Finno-Soviet relations in the period between the world wars remained tense. Voluntary activists arranged expeditions to Karelia (heimosodat), which ended when Finland and the Soviet Union signed the Treaty of Tartu in 1920. However, the Soviet Union did not abide by the treaty when they blockaded Finnish naval ships. Finland was attacked by the USSR in 1939. Finland fought the Winter War and the Continuation War against the Soviet Union in World War II. During these wars the Finns suffered 90,000 casualties and inflicted severe casualties on the Russians (120,000 dead in the Winter War and 200,000 in the Continuation War). Contemporary issues include airspace violations and suspected hybrid warfare by Russia towards Finland. Finland closed its eastern border in late 2023 following weaponized migration facilitated by Russia. The Finnish Defence Forces and Finnish Security Intelligence Service have suspected that Russians have made targeted land purchases near military and other sensitive installations for intelligence or special operations purposes. In recent times, Finland-Russia relations have been almost completely severed due to the Annexation of Crimea by the Russian Federation (which Finland regards as illegal), Russian invasion of Ukraine, and Finland's accession to NATO. Together with the rest of the European Union, Finland enforces sanctions against Russia that followed.
France		See France–Russia relations Russian President Vladimir Putin meets with French President Emmanuel Macron in Saint Petersburg, 25 May 2018 Right after the breakup of the USSR, bilateral relations between France and Russia were initially warm. On 7 February 1992, France signed a bilateral treaty, recognizing Russia as a successor of the USSR.
Germany		See Germany–Russia relations
Greece		See Greece–Russia relations: Greece has an embassy in Moscow and a consulate-general in Saint Petersburg.; Russia has an embassy in Athens and a consulate-general in Thessaloniki.; Greece is on Russia's list of unfriendly countries
Holy See	2009	See Holy See–Russia relations. Russia has an embassy in Rome accredited to the Holy See. Holy See–Russia relations are largely linked to ecumenical relations with the Russian Orthodox Church.
Hungary		See Hungary–Russia relations: Hungary has an embassy in Moscow and two consulate-generals (in Saint Petersburg and Yekaterinburg).; Russia has an embassy in Budapest and a consulate-general in Debrecen.; Both countries are full members of the Organization for Security and Co-operation in Europe.; Both countries legalized homosexuality while opposing same-sex marriages, and outlawed LGBT propaganda towards minors since 2013 (Russia) and 2021 (Hungary) respectively.; Hungary is on Russia's list of unfriendly countries
Iceland		See Iceland–Russia relations: Iceland had an embassy in Moscow from 1955 to 2023, which was closed in August 2023 due to the Russian invasion of Ukraine.; Russia has an embassy in Reykjavík.; Iceland is on Russia's list of unfriendly countries
Ireland		See Ireland–Russia relations: Ireland has an embassy in Moscow.; Russia has an embassy in Dublin.; Ireland is on Russia's list of unfriendly countries
Italy		See Italy–Russia relations Russia has an embassy in Rome and consulates in Genoa, Milan and Palermo, and Italy has an embassy in Moscow, a consulate in Saint Petersburg, two consulte generals (in Ekaterinburg and Kaliningrad), and two embassy branches in (Samara and Volgograd). Both countries are full members of the Organization for Security and Co-operation in Europe. Russia enjoys close relations with Italy. In 2006, Russia and Italy have signed a protocol of cooperation for fighting crime and defending civil liberties. There are close commercial ties between the two countries. Italy is Russia's second important commercial partner in the EU, after Germany. and its state-owned energy company, ENI, has recently signed a very important long-term contract with Gazprom, to import Russian gas into Italy. The relationship between Russia and Italy goes back a long way. Already in the 1960s, Italy's FIAT built a car-assembling plant in the Soviet city of Tolyatti (a city named after the Italian Communist Party's secretary Palmiro Togliatti). Russians have always visited Italy in great numbers. Many Russian students come to Italy each year to study arts and music. Unlike many other Western European countries, Italy has traditionally always maintained good relationships with Russia, even during the Soviet era. In particular, the Silvio Berlusconi Government (2001–2006) strengthened Italy's ties with Russia, due to his personal friendship with President Vladimir Putin. Cooperation extends also to the aviation sector, between Italy's Alenia and Russia's Sukhoi, who are jointly developing a new aircraft. Finally, for a long time Italy had the largest communist party in the Western world, with over 2 million members. .
Latvia	1920-10-04 and again 1991-10-04	See Latvia–Russia relations: Until 1917, Latvia had been part of the Russian empire. Following the Latvian declaration of independence, war broke out between Latvia and the Russian SFSR.; Diplomatic relations between the two countries were first established in 1920, following the conclusion of a Soviet-Latvian peace treaty on 11 August 1920. The treaty was ratified by the Latvian Constituent Assembly on 2 September, and by the Latvian government on 25 September. On the Russian side, it was ratified by the Pan Russian Central Executive Committee on 9 September. Ratification letters were exchanged between the two governments in Moscow on 4 October, the date on which in entered into effect. These relations lasted until the Soviet take over of Latvia in 1940.; Following the collapse of the Soviet Union, the Russian government recognized the independence of Latvia on 24 August 1991.; Russia expresses concern for how Latvia's language and naturalization laws effect Latvia's Russian-speaking population. Russians comprised 27.6% of the population in 2010. In turn, Latvia is interested in the welfare of ethnic Latvians still residing in Russia. The latest Russian census shows about 40,000 still living in Russia, but sources indicate that given the probability of an undercount, Latvians in Russia probably number about 50,000-60,000.
Liechtenstein	30 January 1994	See Liechtenstein–Russia relations: Liechtenstein is on Russia's list of unfriendly countries
Lithuania	12 July 1920 and again 27 July 1991	See Lithuania-Russia relations
Netherlands		See Netherlands-Russia relations: the Netherlands has an embassy in Moscow and consulate-general in Saint Petersburg.; Russia has an embassy in The Hague.; the Netherlands is on Russia's list of unfriendly countries.
Norway	30 October 1905	See Norway–Russia relations: The two countries established formal relations in 1905-10-30; Norway has an embassy in Moscow and a consulate-general in Saint Petersburg and a consulate in Murmansk.; Russia has an embassy in Oslo and consulates-general in Barentsburg and Kirkenes.; See also: Kola Norwegians; Norway is on Russia's list of unfriendly countries
Poland		See Poland–Russia relations In recent years, relations with Russia have worsened considerably. Poland responded with strong disapproval towards the 2008 Georgian Crisis, in which a military invasion of Georgia was led by Russia. Georgia is a former USSR republic, Poland was a member of the Eastern Bloc, and Poland stated its support for Georgia and condemned Russia's actions. The Polish believed the invasion was carried out by the Russians in an attempt to reestablish and reassert its dominance over its former republics. Since 2009, however, relations with Russia somewhat improved – despite the plane accident where the former Polish president died on what is still considered a controversial event. After the Annexation of Crimea by the Russian Federation the relations deteriorated again, as Poland strongly condemned Russian actions against Ukraine.: Poland has an embassy in Moscow and consulates-general in Irkutsk, Kaliningrad and Saint Petersburg.; Russia has an embassy in Warsaw and consulates-general in Gdańsk, Kraków and Poznań.; Poland is on Russia's list of unfriendly countries.
Portugal	1779	See Portugal–Russia relations: The countries are the easternmost and westernmost in Europe, and they both have very good relations with each other.; Portugal has an embassy in Moscow.; Russia has an embassy in Lisbon.
Romania	1878-10-12	See Romania–Russia relations: Romania has an embassy in Moscow and a consulate-general in Saint Petersburg; Russia has an embassy in Bucharest and a consulate-general in Constanța; Romania is on Russia's list of unfriendly countries.
Serbia	1838/1940	See Russia–Serbia relations: Serbia has an embassy in Moscow; Russia has an embassy in Belgrade and a liaison office to UNMIK in Pristina.; Diplomatic relations between the Kingdom of Yugoslavia and the Soviet Union were established on 24 June 1940, and Serbia and the Russian Federation recognize the continuity of all inter-State documents signed between the two countries. There are about 70 bilateral treaties, agreements and protocols signed in the past. Serbia and the Russian Federation have signed and ratified 43 bilateral agreements and treaties in diverse areas of mutual cooperation so far.
Slovakia	1993-01-01	See Russia–Slovakia relations: Russia opened its embassy in Bratislava in 1993.; Slovakia has an embassy in Moscow.; Slovakia is on Russia's list of unfriendly countries
Slovenia	1992-05-25	See Russia–Slovenia relations: Russia has an embassy in Ljubljana.; Slovenia has an embassy in Moscow and two honorary consulates (in Saint Petersburg and Samara).; Slovenia is on Russia's list of unfriendly countries
Spain		See Russia–Spain relations: Russia has an embassy in Madrid and a consulate-general in Barcelona.; Spain has an embassy in Moscow and a consulate-general in Saint Petersburg.; Spain is on Russia's list of unfriendly countries.
Sweden		See Russia–Sweden relations. Both countries had a history of war, and reastablishing diplomatic missions. Russia has an embassy in Stockholm and a consulate in Gothenburg, and Sweden has an embassy in Moscow and consulates in Saint Petersburg and Kaliningrad.
Switzerland	1816	See Russia–Switzerland relations Switzerland opened a consulate in Saint Petersburg in 1816, upgrading it to a legation 90 years later. The two countries broke off diplomatic relations in 1923, when Russia was going through a period of revolutionary turmoil – and they were not resumed until 1946. Russia has an embassy in Bern and a Consulate-General in Geneva. Switzerland has an embassy in Moscow and since 2006, a Consulate-General in Saint Petersburg.: Switzerland is on Russia's list of unfriendly countries
Ukraine	Diplomatic relations severed in February 2022	See Russia–Ukraine relations: Russia had an embassy in Kyiv and consulates-general in Kharkiv, Lviv and Odesa.; Ukraine had an embassy in Moscow and consulates-general in Rostov-on-Don, Saint Petersburg, Tyumen and Vladivostok.; Starting in November 2013, the decision by Ukrainian President Viktor Yanukovych to back out of signing an integration agreement with the European Union started a period of civil unrest between Ukrainians who favored integration with the European Union and those who wanted closer ties with Russia. This culminated in the 2014 Ukrainian Revolution.; Russia took advantage of this political instability to annex Crimea in March 2014, though Ukraine still claims sovereignty over the territory. Russia has also supported separatist forces in the war in Donbas.; In December 2015, Russian hackers reportedly hacked Ukraine's power grids leading to a blackout.; On 24 February 2022, Russia launched an invasion of Ukraine, which prompted Ukraine to break diplomatic ties with its northeastern neighbor.; Ukraine is on Russia's list of unfriendly countries
United Kingdom	20 April 1566	See Russia–United Kingdom relations Russia established diplomatic relations with the United Kingdom on 20 April 1566.: Russia maintains an embassy in London.; The United Kingdom is accredited to Russia through its embassy in Moscow, and a consulate in Yekaterinburg.; In March 2022, the United Kingdom was added to Russia's unfriendly countries list. Both countries share common membership of the G20, and the OSCE. Bilaterally the two countries have an Investment Agreement.

=== Oceania ===
Country	Formal relations began	Notes
Australia	1942	See Australia–Russia relations: The first Australian embassy in Moscow opened in 1943. Australia has an embassy in Moscow and two honorary consulates (in Saint Petersburg and Vladivostok).; Russia has an embassy in Canberra and a consulate-general in Sydney.; Australian Department of Foreign Affairs and Trade about the relation with Russia; Australia is on Russia's list of unfriendly countries
Nauru		See Nauru–Russia relations Russia is represented in Nauru through its embassy in Canberra (Australia). Russia's ambassador to Australia Alexander Blokhin serves concurrently as Russia's non-resident ambassador to Nauru (as well as to Fiji and Vanuatu). Nauru's banks are said to have provided services to the mafia in Russia during the 1990s; over the course of the 1990s, approximately 70 billion US dollars owned by Russian mafia were held in Nauru banks. In 2009, Nauru became the fourth country to recognize the states of Abkhazia and South Ossetia, breakaway regions of Georgia. Only three other UN member states have done so. Russia was reported to be giving Nauru $50M in humanitarian aid in exchange.
New Zealand	1943	See New Zealand–Russia relations: New Zealand has an embassy in Moscow and an honorary consulate in Vladivostok.; Russia has an embassy in Wellington.; Both countries are members of APEC.
Tonga	1976	See Russia–Tonga relations The Kingdom of Tonga and the Soviet Union established formal diplomatic relations in 1976. Tonga was the first Pacific Island country to establish relations with the USSR. The USSR was dissolved in 1991 and was succeeded by Russia as the successor state. On 2 October 2005, Minister of Foreign Affairs of the Russian Federation Sergey Lavrov and Minister of Foreign Affairs of the Kingdom of Tonga ST T. Tupou exchanged telegrams offering congratulations on the occasion of 30th anniversary of establishing diplomatic relations between the two nations. In his heads of foreign ministries of Russia and Tonga expressed confidence in further development of Russian-Tongan relations in the interests of the peoples of both countries and strengthen peace and security in the Asia-Pacific region. Russia has a non-resident ambassador based in Canberra, Australia.
Vanuatu	30 June 1986	See Russia–Vanuatu relations or Soviet Union–Vanuatu relations: In 1987, Vanuatu authorised Soviet vessels to fish within Vanuatu's Exclusive Economic Zone, in exchange for economic aid. The agreement lapsed the following year, and was not renewed, due to disagreements over the price to be paid for fishing rights by the USSR.

== Perception ==
=== Global opinion ===
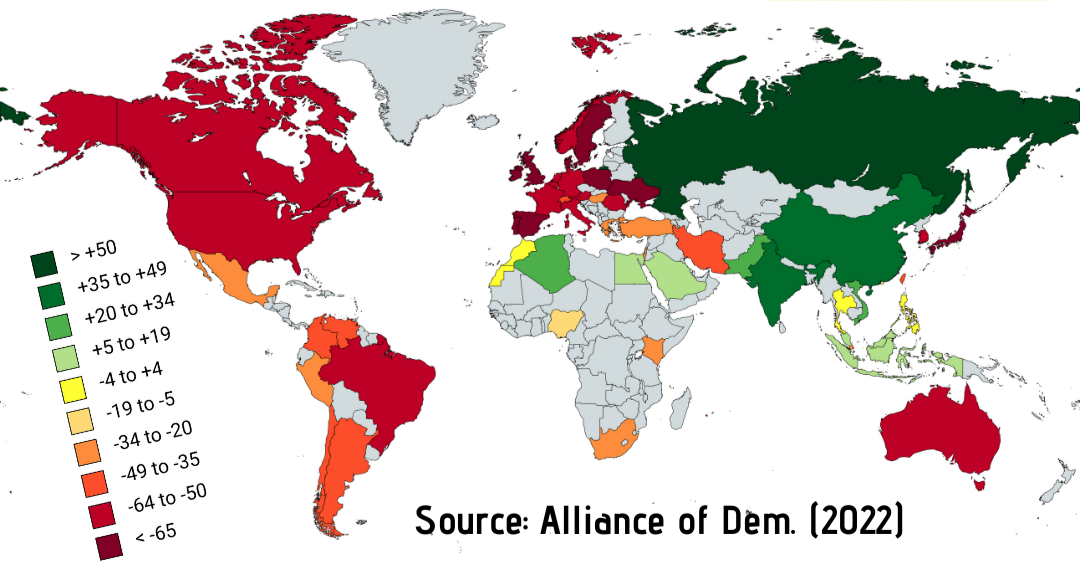
Public opinion on Russia (2022)

Pew Research Center indicated that (as of 2015) only four surveyed countries have a positive view (50% or above) of Russia. The top ten most approving countries are Vietnam (75%), Ghana (56%), China (51%), South Korea (46%), Lebanon (44%), Philippines (44%), India (43%), Nigeria (39%), Tanzania (38%), Ethiopia (37%), and Uganda (37%). The ten countries with the most negative views of Russia were Pakistan (12%), Turkey (15%), Poland (15%), United Kingdom (18%), Jordan (18%), Ukraine (21%), Japan (21%), United States (22%), Mexico (24%), and Australia (24%). Russians' own view of Russia was overwhelmingly positive at 92%.

== Multilateral ==
=== NATO and the European Union ===
Russia is a member of the Commonwealth of Independent States (CIS), Union of Russia and Belarus, Organization for Security and Cooperation in Europe (OSCE), Paris Club, and the North Atlantic Cooperation Council (NACC). It signed the NATO Partnership for Peace initiative on 22 June 1994. On 20 May 1997, NATO and Russia signed the NATO–Russia Founding Act, which the parties hoped would provide the basis for an enduring and robust partnership between the Alliance and Russia—one that could make an important contribution to European security architecture in the 21st century, though already at the time of its signing doubts were cast on whether this accord could deliver on these ambitious goals.

This agreement was superseded by the NATO–Russia Council that was agreed at the Reykjavík Ministerial and unveiled at the Rome NATO Summit in May 2002. On 24 June 1994, Russia and the European Union (EU) signed a partnership and cooperation agreement. European Union imposed sanctions on Russian businesses and individuals in 2014, regarding the annexation of Crimea and alleged support for separatists during War in Donbas.

Following the Russian invasion of Ukraine in 2022, non NATO/EU countries felt threatened by Russia with EU candidate status being granted to Bosnia and Herzegovina, Ukraine and Moldova in 2022, EU negotiations speeding up for Albania and North Macedonia and Finland joining NATO in 2023 with Sweden joining in 2024.

=== Former Soviet Republics and Warsaw Pact ===
The non-Russian countries that were once part of the USSR have been termed the 'near abroad' by Russians. More recently, Russian leaders have been referring to all 15 countries collectively as "Post-Soviet Space," while asserting Russian foreign policy interest throughout the region. After the USSR was dissolved by the presidents of Russia, Ukraine and Belarus, Russia tried to regain some sort of influence over the post-Soviet space by creating, on 8 December 1991, a regional organization – the Commonwealth of Independent States. The following years, Russia initiated a set of agreements with the Post-Soviet states which were designed to institutionalize the relations inside the CIS. However, most of these agreements were not fulfilled and the CIS republics began to drift away from Russia, which at that time was attempting to stabilize its broken economy and ties with the West.

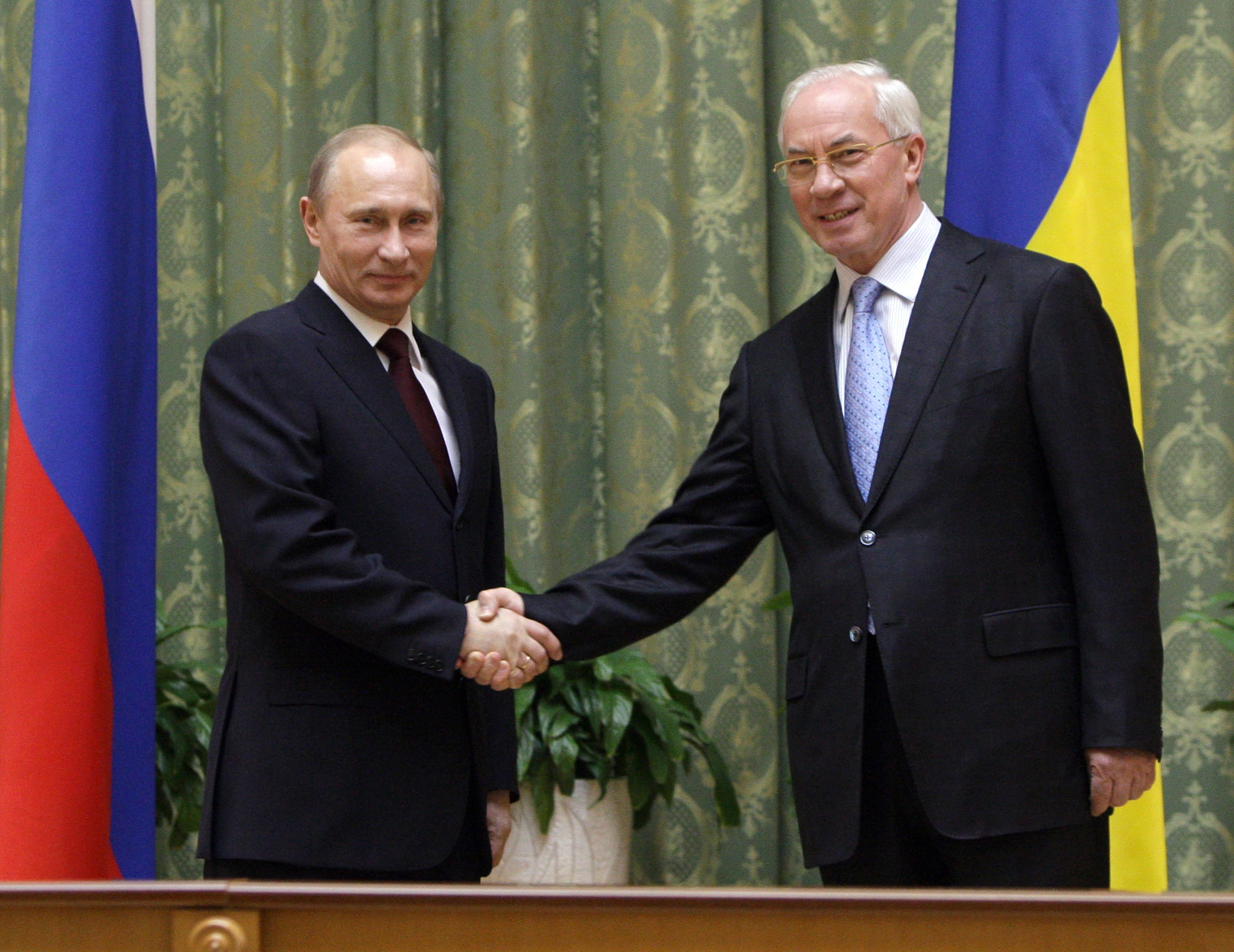
Vladimir Putin and the Ukrainian Prime Minister Mykola Azarov, 12 April 2011

One of the major issues which had an influence on the foreign relations of Russia in FSU was the remaining large Russian minority populations in many countries of the near abroad. This issue has been dealt with in various ways by each individual country. They have posed a particular problem in countries where they live close to the Russian border, such as in Ukraine and Kazakhstan, with some of these Russians calling for these areas to be absorbed into Russia. By and large, however, Russians in the near-abroad do not favor active intervention of Russia into the domestic affairs of neighboring countries, even in defense of the interests of ethnic Russians. Moreover, the three Baltic states (Estonia, Latvia, and Lithuania) have clearly signaled their desire to be outside any claimed Russian sphere of influence, as is reflected by their joining both the NATO alliance and the European Union in 2004.

Close cultural, ethnic and historical links exist between Russia, Belarus and Ukraine. The traditional Russian perspective is that they are one ethnic group, with Russians called 'Great Russians', Belarusians 'White Russians' and Ukrainians 'Little Russians'. This manifested itself in lower levels of nationalism in these areas, particularly Belarus and Ukraine, during the disintegration of the Soviet Union. However, few Ukrainians accept a "younger brother" status relative to Russia, and Russia's efforts to insert itself into Ukrainian domestic politics, such as Putin's endorsement of a candidate for the Ukrainian presidency in the last election, are contentious.

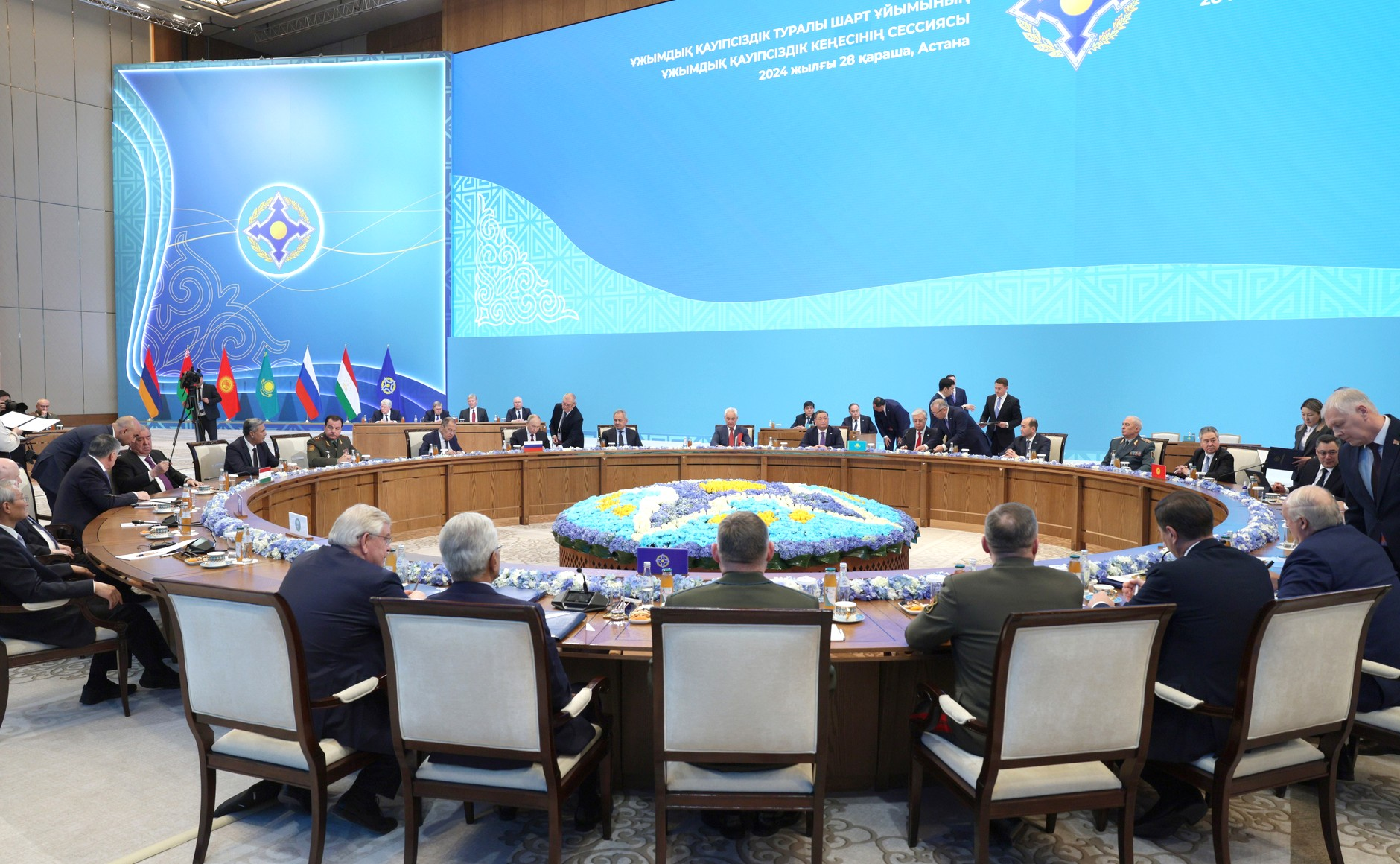
Meeting of the Russian-led military alliance Collective Security Treaty Organization (CSTO) in Astana, Kazakhstan on 28 November 2024

Russia maintains its military bases in Armenia, Belarus, Kyrgyzstan, the Transnistria region of Moldova, the occupied South Ossetia region of Georgia and Tajikistan. Russia's relationships with Georgia are at their lowest point in modern history due to the Georgian-Russian espionage controversy and due to the 2008 Russo-Georgian war, Georgia broke off diplomatic relations with Russia and has left the Commonwealth of Independent States.

Russia's relations with Ukraine, since 2013, are also at their lowest point in history as a result of the pro-Western Euromaidan revolution in Ukraine, the annexation of Crimea and the pro-Russian insurgency in Ukraine's Donetsk and Luhansk regions. Ukraine withdrew from the Commonwealth of Independent States in 2018, with Moldova following in 2022 after Russia invaded Ukraine.

Russia maintains diplomatic relations with most countries that were once part of the former Warsaw Pact, and furthermore, Albania. Russia also continues to maintain friendly relations with Cuba as well as third world and non-aligned countries of Afghanistan, Angola, Benin, Congo, Egypt, Ethiopia, Grenada, Guinea-Bissau, India, Iraq, Mozambique, Serbia and the former Southern part of Yemen.

=== International membership ===
Membership in International Organizations:

Russia holds a permanent seat, which grants it veto power, on the Security Council of the United Nations (UN). Prior to 1991, the Soviet Union held Russia's UN seat, but, after the breakup of the Soviet Union the Russian government informed the United Nations that Russia will continue the Soviet Union's membership at the United Nations and all other UN organs.

Russia is an active member of numerous UN system organizations, including:

- UN General Assembly and Security Council
- Food and Agriculture Organization
- United Nations Conference on Trade and Development
- UN Educational, Scientific and Cultural Organization
- UN Office of the High Commissioner for Refugees
- United Nations Industrial Development Organization
- United Nations Economic Commission for Europe

Russia also participates in some of the most important UN peacekeeping missions, including:

- United Nations Mission in Sierra Leone
- United Nations Iraq–Kuwait Observation Mission
- United Nations Institute for Training and Research
- United Nations Mission in Bosnia and Herzegovina
- United Nations Operation in Côte d'Ivoire
- United Nations Mission in Ethiopia and Eritrea
- United Nations Mission of Observers in Prevlaka
- United Nations Observer Mission in Georgia
- United Nations Transitional Administration in East Timor
- United Nations Truce Supervision Organization
- United Nations Mission for the Referendum in Western Sahara
- United Nations Organization Mission in the Democratic Republic of the Congo

Russia also holds memberships in:

- Asia-Pacific Economic Cooperation
- Association of Caribbean States (observer)
- Bank for International Settlements
- Black Sea Economic Cooperation
- European Organization for Nuclear Research (observer, suspended as of March 2022)
- Commonwealth of Independent States
- Collective Security Treaty Organisation
- Euro-Atlantic Partnership Council
- Economic and Social Commission for Asia and the Pacific
- Group of 20
- International Atomic Energy Agency
- International Civil Aviation Organization
- International Red Cross and Red Crescent Movement
- International Development Association
- International Finance Corporation
- International Hydrographic Organization
- International Labour Organization
- International Monetary Fund
- International Maritime Organization
- International Mobile Satellite Organization
- International Criminal Police Organization
- International Olympic Committee
- International Organization for Migration (observer)
- International Organization for Standardization
- International Telecommunication Union
- Latin American Integration Association (observer)
- Non-Aligned Movement (observer)
- Nuclear Suppliers Group
- Organization of American States (observer)
- Organisation of Islamic Cooperation (observer)
- Organisation for the Prohibition of Chemical Weapons
- Organization for Security and Co-operation in Europe
- Permanent Court of Arbitration
- Partnership for Peace
- Shanghai Cooperation Organisation
- World Tourism Organization
- Universal Postal Union
- World Customs Organization
- World Federation of Trade Unions
- World Health Organization
- World Intellectual Property Organization
- World Meteorological Organization
- World Trade Organization
- Zangger Committee

== Mediation in international conflicts ==
Russia has played an important role in helping mediate international conflicts and has been particularly actively engaged in trying to promote a peace following the Transnistrian war and the Kosovo conflict and the Proposed Russian annexation of South Ossetia. Russia's foreign minister claimed on 25 February 2008 that NATO and the European Union have been considering using force to keep Serbs from leaving Kosovo following the 2008 Kosovo declaration of independence.

Russia is a co-sponsor of the Middle East peace process and supports UN and multilateral initiatives in the Persian Gulf, Myanmar, Angola, the former Yugoslavia, and Haiti. Russia is a founding member of the Contact Group and (since the Denver Summit in June 1997) a member of the G8. In November 1998, Russia joined the Asia-Pacific Economic Cooperation Forum (APEC). Russia has contributed troops to the NATO-led stabilization force in Bosnia and has affirmed its respect for international law and OSCE principles. Russia has accepted UN and OSCE involvement in instances of regional conflict in neighboring countries, including the dispatch of observers to Georgia, Moldova, Tajikistan, and the former Republic of Artsakh, where in October 2023 Russian troops failed to withstand the incursion of the Azeri army.

Russia supported, on 16 May 2007, the set up of the international tribunal to try the suspects in the murder of the Lebanese Prime Minister, Rafiq Hariri.

== Territorial disputes ==
- The dispute between Russia and Latvia regarding the Pytalovo (Abrene) area of Pskov Oblast, Russia, was settled in 27 March 1997 border treaty.
- Disputes over the boundary with the People's Republic of China were finally resolved on 21 July 2008. On that day the Foreign Ministers of the two countries signed an agreement in Beijing. Under the agreement, Russia ceded approximately 174 km^{2} of territory to China. The territory transferred comprised Tarabarov Island and approximately half of Bolshoy Ussuriysky Island. The area transferred was largely uninhabited. The settlement of their border dispute followed over 40 years of negotiations. The final settlement was the result of the Treaty of Good-Neighborliness and Friendly Cooperation which was concluded on 2 June 2005 and signed by Chinese Foreign Minister Li Zhaoxing and his Russian counterpart, Sergei Lavrov. This followed talks in Vladivostok. There is now no border dispute between Russia and China along their 4300 km border.
- Caspian Sea boundaries are not yet determined among all littoral states. Issues between Russia and the states bordering it – Azerbaijan and Kazakhstan – were settled in 2003. Russia has no common land or Caspian-sea border with Turkmenistan and Iran, which do not agree with the Caspian Sea settlements.
- Russia has made no territorial claim in Antarctica, despite being a state that has first discovered that continent (but has reserved the right to make these claims), and does not recognize the claims of any other nation. The Soviet Union signed the Antarctic Treaty in 1960.
- De jure Taiwan asserts that its territory includes all former lands of the Qing empire including Tuva, a part of Russia since 1944. Taiwan does not actively pursue its claim as it lacks any official relationship with Russia, which does not recognize Taiwan as a sovereign nation.

=== Unresolved ===
As of January 2023, Russian President Vladimir Putin cited recognition of Russia's sovereignty over the annexed territories (pictured) as a condition for peace talks with Ukraine.

- The Kuril Islands dispute concerns the islands of Iturup, Kunashir, and Shikotan and the Khabomai group, all of which had belonged to the Japanese Empire from 1855 until the Soviet–Japanese War when the Soviet Union occupied them and the southern part of the Sakhalin island since Japan has lost the war. The Russian SFSR, then part of the USSR, got them at the end of the Second World War during the 1945 Yalta Conference, when the Allies agreed to the cession of the islands to the USSR. However, this stipulation was not included in the treaty of Capitulation of Japan which later gave Japan a chance to demand the return of the "controversial northern territories". However, the disputed territory is currently administered by the Russian Federation, and the majority of inhabitants of the disputed territory are supportive of Russian administration, because all the Japanese inhabitants were expelled from the islands in 1946.
- Territorial issues between Estonia and Russia regarding some territories of Pskov and Leningrad Oblast of Russia are still unresolved. The 2005 treaty on Estonia–Russia border was not ratified by the Russian side. Negotiations were reopened in 2012 and the Treaty was signed in February 2014, but ratification is still pending. In March 2022, President Putin sent the Estonian-Russia Border Agreement to the Russian-State Duma to be ratified, but nothing has come of it as of July 2022.
- Disputes over the boundary with Georgia relating to Russia's recognition of Georgian regions, South Ossetia and Abkhazia as independent states, due to the 2008 South Ossetia war and which has led to the severance of all diplomatic relations between them.
- Following the breakup of the Soviet Union, the Russian Federation refused to recognize Ukrainian sovereignty over Sevastopol as well as over the surrounding Crimean Oblast, using the argument that the city was never practically integrated into the Ukrainian SSR because of its military status. This claim was relinquished in the bilateral Peace and Friendship Treaty, which confirmed that both the Crimea and Sevastopol belong to Ukraine. A separate treaty established the terms of a long-term lease of land and resources in and around Sevastopol by Russia. In the Annexation of Crimea by the Russian Federation of early 2014 Crimea was annexed by Russia. Since then status of the Crimea and of the city of Sevastopol is currently under dispute between Russia and Ukraine; Ukraine and the majority of the UN members consider Crimea to be an autonomous republic of Ukraine and Sevastopol to be one of Ukraine's cities with special status, while Russia and other UN members, on the other hand, consider Crimea to be a federal subject of Russia and Sevastopol to be one of Russia's federal cities. On 31 March 2014 the State Duma approved the denunciation of the above-mentioned Peace and Friendship Treaty and long-term lease of land in Sevastopol. Russia officially does not recognize "Crimea question" as a ground for any territorial disputes.
- Donetsk oblast of Ukraine, currently occupied and claimed by Russia.
- Luhansk oblast of Ukraine, currently occupied and claimed by Russia.
- Kherson and Zaporizhzhia oblasts, partially occupied and claimed by Russia.

== See also ==
- Arctic policy of Russia
- Foreign policy of Vladimir Putin
- Foreign relations of the Soviet Union
- Foundations of Geopolitics
- List of diplomatic missions in Russia
- List of diplomatic missions of Russia
- Visa requirements for Russian citizens
- BRICS
- History of Russia (1991–present)
