= List of diplomatic missions in Russia =

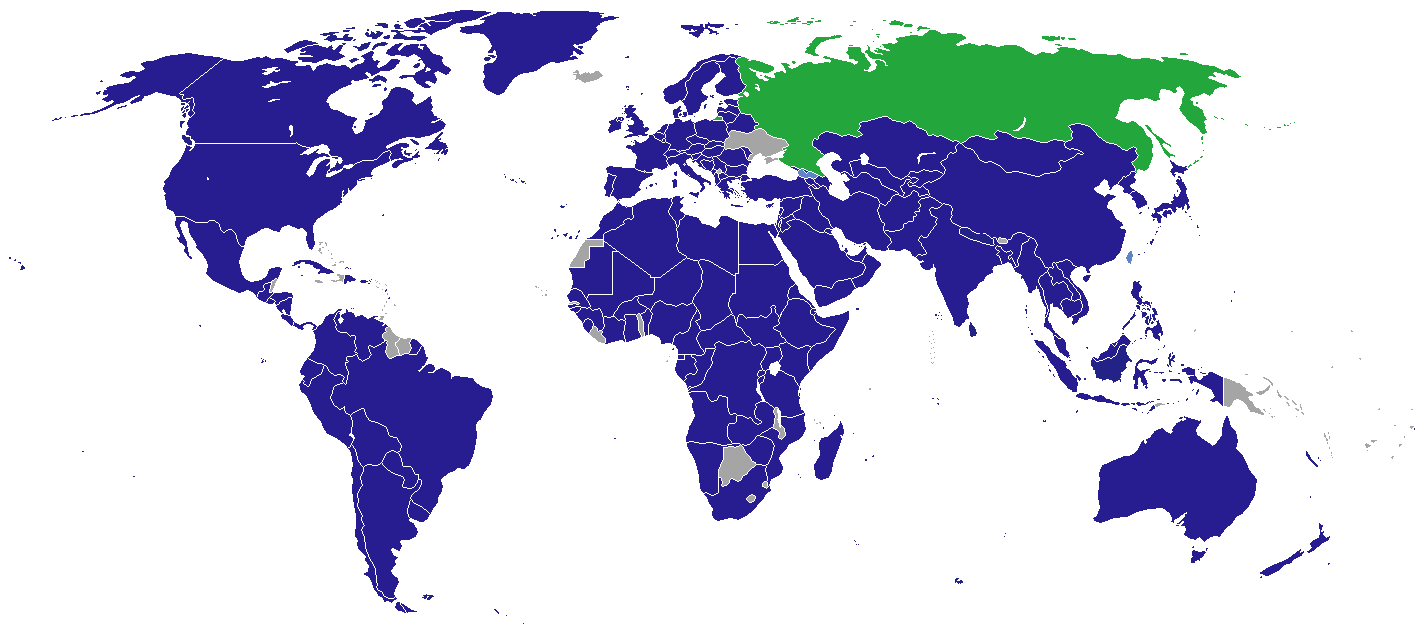
Countries with diplomatic missions in Russia

This is a list of diplomatic missions in Russia that are foreign embassies and consulates in Russia. As the world's largest country by land area, and a major great power, as well as what some analysts describe as a potential superpower, the Russian Federation is a permanent member of the United Nations Security Council. Russia is the successor state to the Soviet Union, and hosts a large diplomatic community in its capital city of Moscow. Moscow hosts 148 embassies, with numerous countries maintaining consulates general and consulates in Saint Petersburg and other cities throughout the country.

== Diplomatic missions in Russia ==
=== Embassies in Moscow ===
Delegation	Link to embassy article	Year established	District	Photo	Website
Abkhazia	Embassy	2009	Tverskoy		link
Afghanistan	Embassy		Presnensky		link
Albania	Embassy	1991	Yakimanka		link
Algeria	Embassy		Tverskoy		link
Angola	Embassy		Ramenki		link
Argentina	Embassy	1947	Yakimanka		link
Armenia	Embassy		Basmanny		link
Australia	Embassy		Tagansky		link
Austria	Embassy	1955	Khamovniki		link
Azerbaijan	Embassy	1992	Presnensky		link
Bahrain	Embassy	1991	Yakimanka		link
Bangladesh	Embassy		Khamovniki		link
Belarus	Embassy	1993	Basmanny		link
Belgium	Embassy		Arbat		link
Benin	Embassy		Tverskoy		-
Bolivia	Embassy		Danilovsky		-
Bosnia and Herzegovina	Embassy		Ramenki		-
Brazil	Embassy		Presnensky		link
Brunei	Embassy	2001	Dorogomilovo		link
Bulgaria	Embassy		Ramenki		link
Burkina Faso	Embassy		Yakimanka		link
Burundi	Embassy		Yakimanka		link
Cambodia	Embassy		Khamovniki		-
Cameroon	Embassy		Arbat		link
Canada	Embassy	1943	Arbat		link
Central African Republic	Embassy		Troparyovo-Nikulino		-
Chad	Embassy		Yakimanka		-
Chile	Embassy		Khamovniki		link
China	Embassy		Ramenki		link
Colombia	Embassy		Khamovniki		link
Democratic Republic of the Congo	Embassy		Nagorny		
Republic of the Congo	Embassy		Yakimanka		-
Costa Rica	Embassy	1975	Krylatskoye		-
Croatia	Embassy	1992	Khamovniki		link
Cuba	Embassy		Yakimanka		link
Cyprus	Embassy		Arbat		link
Czech Republic	Embassy		Presnensky		link
Denmark	Embassy		Khamovniki		link
Djibouti	Embassy				-
Dominican Republic	Embassy	2007	Krylatskoye		-
Ecuador	Embassy	1970	Basmanny		link
Egypt	Embassy		Khamovniki		link
El Salvador	Embassy	2012			-
Equatorial Guinea	Embassy	1981	Yakimanka		-
Eritrea	Embassy	1996	Yakimanka		-
Estonia	Embassy		Presnensky		link
Ethiopia	Embassy		Meshchansky		-
Finland	Embassy		Khamovniki		link
France	Embassy		Yakimanka		link
Gabon	Embassy		Arbat		-
Gambia	Embassy	2016			-
Germany	Embassy		Ramenki		link
Ghana	Embassy	1960	Presnensky		link
Grenada	Embassy	2017	Presnensky		link
Greece	Embassy		Presnensky		link
Guatemala	Embassy	1994	Yakimanka		-
Guinea	Embassy		Yakimanka		-
Guinea-Bissau	Embassy		Nagorny		-
Holy See	Apostolic Nunciature	1990	Tverskoy		link
Honduras	Embassy	2013	Yakimanka		-
Hungary	Embassy		Ramenki		link
India	Embassy	1947	Tagansky		link
Indonesia	Embassy		Zamoskvorechye		link
Iran	Embassy		Basmanny		link
Iraq	Embassy		Khamovniki		link
Ireland	Embassy	1973	Meshchansky		link
Israel	Embassy	1991	Yakimanka		link
Italy	Embassy		Khamovniki		link
Ivory Coast	Embassy		Khamovniki		link
Japan	Embassy	1956	Krasnoselsky		link
Jordan	Embassy		Tverskoy		-
Kazakhstan	Embassy		Basmanny		link
Kenya	Embassy		Khamovniki		link
Kuwait	Embassy		Ramenki		-
Kyrgyzstan	Embassy		Yakimanka		link
Laos	Embassy		Presnensky		link
Latvia	Embassy	1991	Basmanny		link
Lebanon	Embassy		Tverskoy		-
Libya	Embassy	1962	Ramenki		-
Lithuania	Embassy		Arbat		link
Luxembourg	Embassy		Khamovniki		link
Madagascar	Embassy	1976	Khamovniki		link
Malaysia	Embassy		Ramenki		link
Mali	Embassy		Zamoskvorechye		-
Malta	Embassy		Yakimanka		link
Mauritania	Embassy		Khamovniki		-
Mauritius	Embassy	2003	Tagansky		-
Mexico	Embassy	1864	Khamovniki		link
Moldova	Embassy		Meshchansky		link
Mongolia	Embassy		Arbat		link
Montenegro	Embassy	2007	Yakimanka		-
Morocco	Embassy		Arbat		link
Mozambique	Embassy		Yuzhnoportovy		-
Myanmar	Embassy		Presnensky		-
Namibia	Embassy		Yakimanka		-
Nepal	Embassy	1961	Khamovniki		link
Netherlands	Embassy		Presnensky		link
New Zealand	Embassy	1973	Presnensky		link
Nicaragua	Embassy		Ramenki		-
Niger	Embassy		Ramenki		link
Nigeria	Embassy	1962	Presnensky		link
North Korea	Embassy		Ramenki		-
North Macedonia	Embassy		Akademichesky		link
Norway	Embassy		Arbat		link
Oman	Embassy	1987	Yakimanka		-
Pakistan	Embassy		Presnensky		link
Palestine	Embassy	1981	Khamovniki		link
Panama	Embassy		Ramenki		-
Paraguay	Embassy		Yakimanka		link
Peru	Embassy		Khamovniki		link
Philippines	Embassy	1977	Arbat		link
Poland	Embassy		Presnensky		link
Portugal	Embassy		Meshchansky		-
Qatar	Embassy	1989	Yakimanka		
Romania	Embassy		Ramenki		link
Rwanda	Embassy		Ramenki		link
Saudi Arabia	Embassy	1990	Khamovniki		link
Senegal	Embassy		Yakimanka		link
Serbia	Embassy		Ramenki		link
Sierra Leone	Embassy	1965	Krylatskoye		-
Singapore	Embassy	1971	Arbat		link
Slovakia	Embassy	1993	Presnensky		link
Slovenia	Embassy	1992	Tverskoy		link
Somalia	Embassy		Nagorny		-
South Africa	Embassy		Presnensky		link
South Korea	Embassy	1990	Khamovniki		link
South Ossetia	Embassy	2009	Khamovniki		link
South Sudan	Embassy		Yakimanka		link
Spain	Embassy		Presnensky		link
Sri Lanka	Embassy	1957	Meshchansky		link
Sudan	Embassy		Tverskoy		-
Sweden	Embassy		Ramenki		link
Switzerland	Embassy	1946	Basmanny		link
Syria	Embassy	1946	Khamovniki		-
Tajikistan	Embassy		Presnensky		link
Tanzania	Embassy		Zamoskvorechye		link
Thailand	Embassy		Krasnoselsky		link
Tunisia	Embassy		Presnensky		-
Turkey	Embassy		Khamovniki		link
Turkmenistan	Embassy		Arbat		link
Uganda	Embassy	1964	Yakimanka		link
United Arab Emirates	Embassy	1987	Ramenki		link
United Kingdom	Embassy		Arbat		link
United States	Embassy	1934	Presnensky		link
Uruguay	Embassy		Zamoskvorechye		link
Uzbekistan	Embassy		Yakimanka		link
Venezuela	Embassy		Tverskoy		link
Vietnam	Embassy	1969	Khamovniki		link
Yemen	Embassy		Khamovniki		-
Zambia	Embassy	1965	Meshchansky		-
Zimbabwe	Embassy	1985	Khamovniki		-

=== Consulates in Saint Petersburg ===
Delegation	Mission type	Year established	District	Photo	Website
Armenia	Consulate-General	2000	Admiralteysky		-
Azerbaijan	Consulate-General	2004	Tsentralny		link
Belarus	Branch		Tsentralny		-
Bulgaria	Consulate-General	1974	Tsentralny		link
China	Consulate-General	1986	Admiralteysky		link
Cyprus	Consulate-General	2003	Tsentralny		link
Czech Republic	Consulate-General	1974	Tsentralny		link
Denmark	Consulate-General	1992	Petrogradsky		link
Finland	Consulate-General	1967	Tsentralny		link
France	Consulate-General	1972	Tsentralny		link
Germany	Consulate-General	1972	Tsentralny		link
Greece	Consulate-General	1996	Tsentralny		link
Hungary	Consulate-General	1978	Tsentralny		-
India	Consulate-General	1993	Tsentralny		link
Italy	Consulate-General	1990	Admiralteysky		link
Japan	Consulate-General	1971	Tsentralny		link
Kazakhstan	Consulate-General	2004	Admiralteysky		link
Netherlands	Consulate-General	1992	Tsentralny		link
North Macedonia	Consulate-General	?	?		link
Norway	Consulate-General	1993	Tsentralny	View from Kazanskaya Street	link
Pakistan	Consulate-General	1996	Tsentralny		link
Romania	Consulate-General	2003	Tsentralny		link
South Korea	Consulate-General	2006	Tsentralny		link
Spain	Consulate-General		Tsentralny		link
Switzerland	Consulate-General	2006	Tsentralny		link
Tajikistan	Consulate-General				link
Turkey	Consulate-General	2007			link

=== Consulates in Yekaterinburg ===
Delegation	Type	Date established	Photo	Website
Azerbaijan	Consulate-General	2009		-
Belarus	Branch	2001		-
China	Consulate-General	2009		link
Cyprus	Consulate-General			link
Czech Republic	Consulate-General	2002		link
France	Consulate-General	2008		link
Germany	Consulate-General	2005		link
Hungary	Consulate-General	2007		link
Kazakhstan	Consulate-General			
Kyrgyzstan	Consulate-General	2002		link
Tajikistan	Consulate-General	2009		link
United Kingdom	Consulate-General	1997		link
Vietnam	Consulate-General	2007		link

=== Consulates in the remainder of Russia ===
Delegation	City	Type	Date established	Photo	Website
Armenia	Rostov-on-Don	Consulate-General			-
Belarus	Kaliningrad	Branch			-
Belarus	Khabarovsk	Branch			-
Belarus	Krasnodar	Branch			-
Belarus	Nizhniy Novgorod	Branch			-
Belarus	Novosibirsk	Branch			-
Belarus	Smolensk	Branch	2010		-
Belarus	Tyumen	Branch			-
Belarus	Ufa	Branch			-
Belarus	Vladivostok	Branch	2021		-
China	Irkutsk	Consulate-General	2009		link
China	Khabarovsk	Consulate-General			link
China	Vladivostok	Consular-General	2005		link
China	Kazan	Consulate-General	2017		link
Cyprus	Krasnodar	Consulate-General			link
Cyprus	Samara	Consulate-General			link
India	Vladivostok	Consulate-General	1992		-
Iran	Astrakhan	Consulate-General	2001		link
Iran	Kazan	Consulate-General	2007		link
Japan	Khabarovsk	Consulate-General	1993		link
Japan	Vladivostok	Consulate-General	1967 (Note: The Consulate-General of Japan was located in Nakhodka from 1967 until April 1993, when it was relocated to Vladivostok.)		link
Japan	Yuzhno-Sakhalinsk	Consulate-General	2001		link
Kazakhstan	Astrakhan	Consulate-General	2002		
Kazakhstan	Kazan	Consulate-General			
Kazakhstan	Omsk	Consulate-General	2005		[
Kyrgyzstan	Novosibirsk	Vice-Consulate	2005		-
Lithuania	Kaliningrad	Consulate-General	1994		link
Lithuania	Sovetsk	Consulate	2003		link
Mongolia	Irkutsk	Consulate-General	1971		link
Mongolia	Kyzyl	Consulate-General	2002		-
Mongolia	Ulan-Ude	Consulate-General			-
North Korea	Khabarovsk	Consular Office	2005		-
North Korea	Nakhodka	Consulate-General	1958		-
Romania	Rostov-on-Don	Consulate-General	2006		-
South Korea	Irkutsk	Consulate-General	2009		link
South Korea	Vladivostok	Consulate-General	1992		link
Tajikistan	Novosibirsk	Consulate-General			link
Tajikistan	Ufa	Consulate-General			link
Turkey	Kazan	Consulate-General	1992		link
Turkey	Krasnodar	Consulate-General	2024		link
Turkmenistan	Astrakhan	Consulate	2013		link
Uzbekistan	Novosibirsk	Consulate-General	2007		-
Vietnam	Vladivostok	Consulate-General	1989 (Note: The Consulate-General of Vietnam was located in Nakhodka from September 1989 until November 1996, when it was relocated to Vladivostok.)		link

== Other missions ==
- European Union (Delegation)
- Georgia (Interests Section in Swiss Embassy)
- Sahrawi Arab Democratic Republic (Representative Office)
- Sovereign Military Order of Malta (Delegation)
- Republic of China (Taiwan) (Representative Office)

== Closed missions ==
Host city	Sending country	Mission	Year closed	Photo	Ref.
Moscow	Georgia	Embassy	2008		
Moscow	Ukraine	Embassy	2022		
Moscow	Iceland	Embassy	2023		
Irkutsk	Poland	Consulate-General	2025		
Kaliningrad
Kaliningrad	Sweden	Consulate-General	2009		
Kaliningrad	Latvia	Consular section chancery	2022		
Kaliningrad	Germany	Consulate-General	2023		
Kaliningrad	Poland	Consulate-General	2025		
Murmansk	Norway	Consulate-General	2022		
Murmansk	Finland	Consulate-General	2023		
Nakhodka	Japan	Consulate-General	1993		
Novorossiysk	Greece	Consulate-General	2023		
Novosibirsk
Novosibirsk	Germany	Consulate-General	2023		
Petrozavodsk	Finland	Consulate-General	2023		
Pskov	Estonia	Consulate-General Chancery	2022		
Pskov	Latvia	Consulate	2022		
Smolensk	Poland	Consulate-General Branch	2023		
Sochi	Armenia	Consular Station	2023		
Saint Petersburg	Iran	Consulate-General	1993		
Saint Petersburg	Belgium	Consulate-General	2007		
Saint Petersburg	United Kingdom	Consulate-General	2018		
Saint Petersburg	United States	Consulate-General	2019		
Saint Petersburg	Estonia	Consulate-General	2022		
Saint Petersburg	Latvia	Consulate-General	2022		
Saint Petersburg	Lithuania	Consulate-General	2022		
Saint Petersburg	Sweden	Consulate-General	2023		
Saint Petersburg	Poland	Consulate-General	2025		
Saint Petersburg	Romania	Consulate-General	2026		
Saint Petersburg	Germany	Consulate-General	2026		
Vladivostok	United States	Consulate-General	2020		
Yekaterinburg	United States	Consulate-General	2020		

== Non-Resident Embassies ==
Resident in Berlin, Germany

- Cape Verde
- Haiti
- Jamaica
- Lesotho
- Maldives
- Malawi
- Togo

Resident in Brussels, Belgium

- Andorra
- Liechtenstein
- Monaco
- Saint Kitts and Nevis
- Saint Lucia
- Saint Vincent and the Grenadines
- San Marino
- São Tomé and Príncipe

Resident in London, United Kingdom

- Antigua and Barbuda
- Belize
- Dominica
- Guyana
- Papua New Guinea
- Seychelles
- Trinidad and Tobago

Resident in Tokyo, Japan

- Fiji
- Marshall Islands
- Palau
- Samoa

Resident in elsewhere

- Botswana (Stockholm)
- Eswatini (Geneva)
- Suriname (The Hague)

== Embassies to open ==
- Timor-Leste

== States with no relations ==
- Bhutan
- Georgia
- Micronesia
- Solomon Islands
- Ukraine

== See also ==
- Ministry of Foreign Affairs of Russia
- Foreign minister of Russia
- Foreign relations of Russia
- List of Russian diplomats
- Diplomatic missions of Russia
- Visa requirements for Russian citizens
