= Embassy of Cuba, Moscow =

Coordinates: 55°43′55″N 37°37′26″E

Embassy of Cuba in Moscow
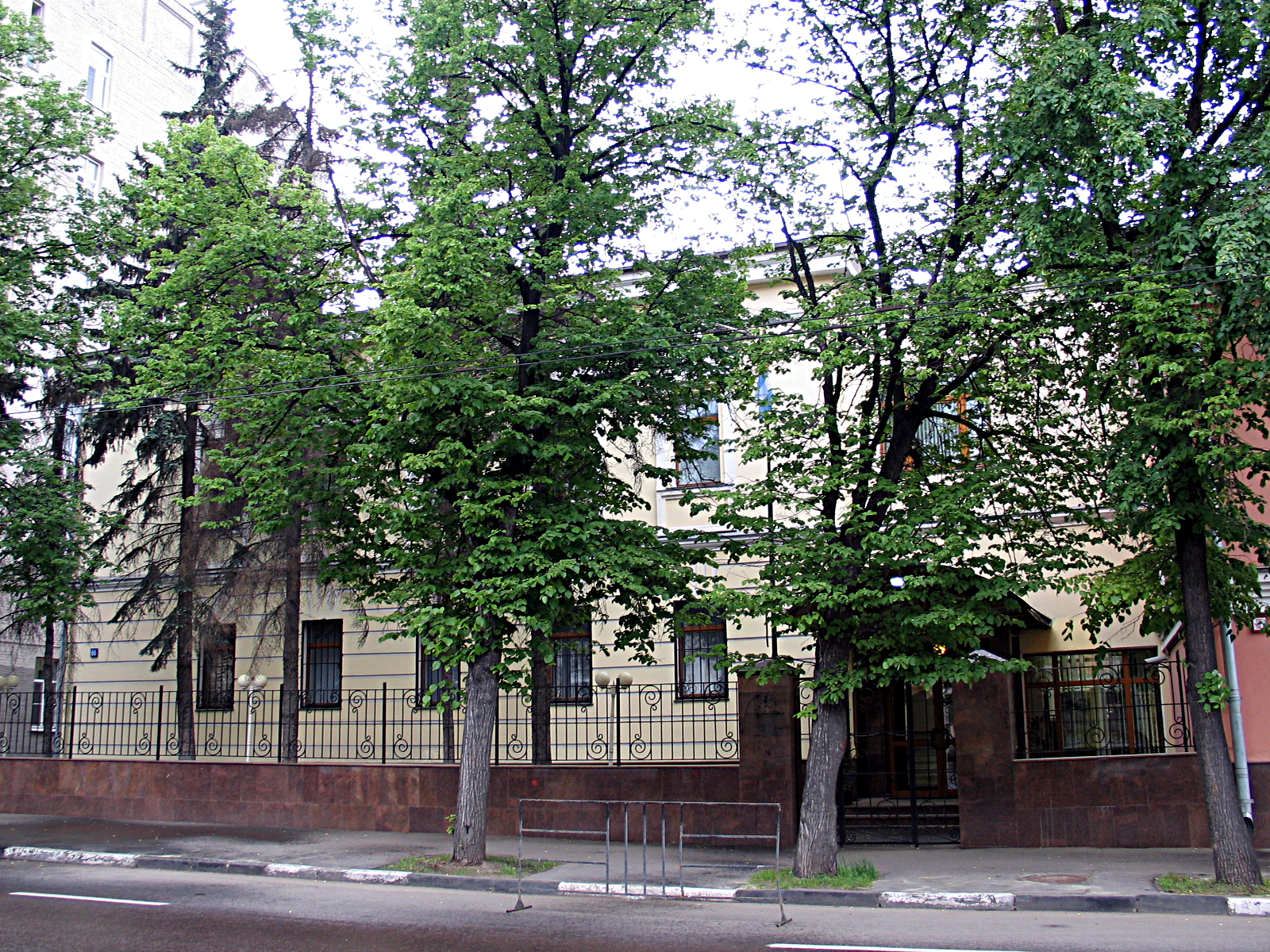
- Location: Moscow

The Embassy of Cuba in Moscow is the diplomatic mission of Cuba in the Russian Federation. It is located at 66 Bolshaya Ordynka Street (Russian: Б. Ордынка, 66) in the Yakimanka District of Moscow.

== See also ==
- Cuba–Russia relations
- Diplomatic missions in Russia
