= Embassy of Argentina, Moscow =

Moscow

Embassy of Argentina in Moscow Посольство Аргентины в Москве Embajada de Argentina en Moscú
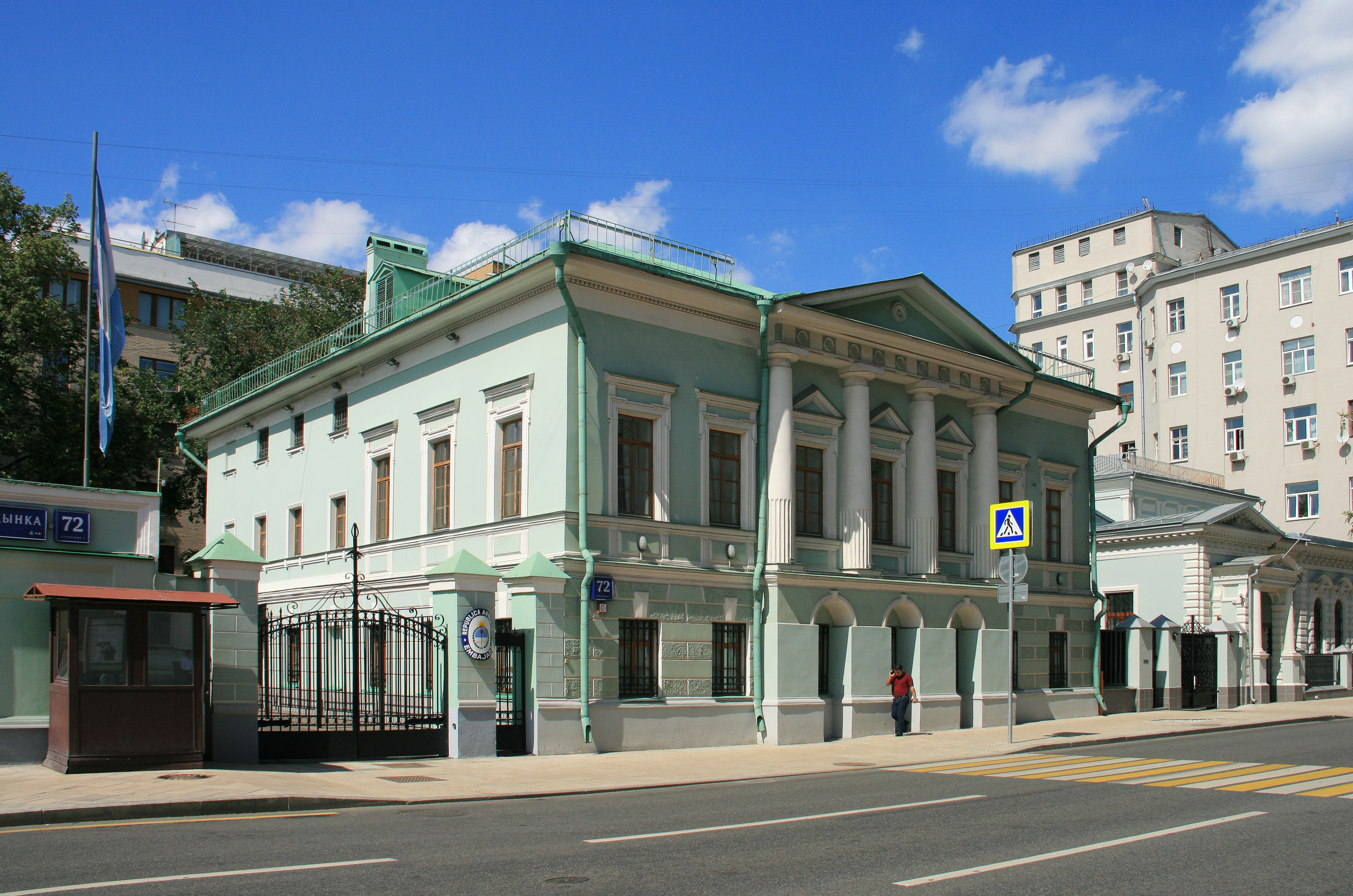
- Location: Moscow
- Address: 72 Bolshaya Ordynka Street
- Coordinates: 55°43′51″N 37°37′26″E
- Ambassador: Ricardo Ernesto Lagorio

The Embassy of Argentina in Moscow is the diplomatic mission of the Argentine Republic to the Russian Federation. It is located at 72 Bolshaya Ordynka Street (Russian: ул. Большая Ордынка, 72) in the Yakimanka District of Moscow.

The Empire style building was completed in 1823–1824 as tradeswoman Nadezhda Lobanova's home. Lobanova lived here until 1835; subsequent owners also belonged to the merchant estate. The Pugovkin family, who owned the house after 1859, altered the façade in line with eclecticism of the period.

Prior to housing the embassy of Argentina, the building was home to the embassy of Rwanda. The Embassy of Argentina moved here from the historic List House in the early 2000s.

== See also ==
- Argentina–Russia relations
