= Korea–Russia relations =

Korea–Russia relations may refer to bilateral foreign relations between the Russian Federation and the two Korean states:

- North Korea–Russia relations
- Russia–South Korea relations
