= Wynjones Kisamba =

Tanzanian retired Lieutenant General and diplomat

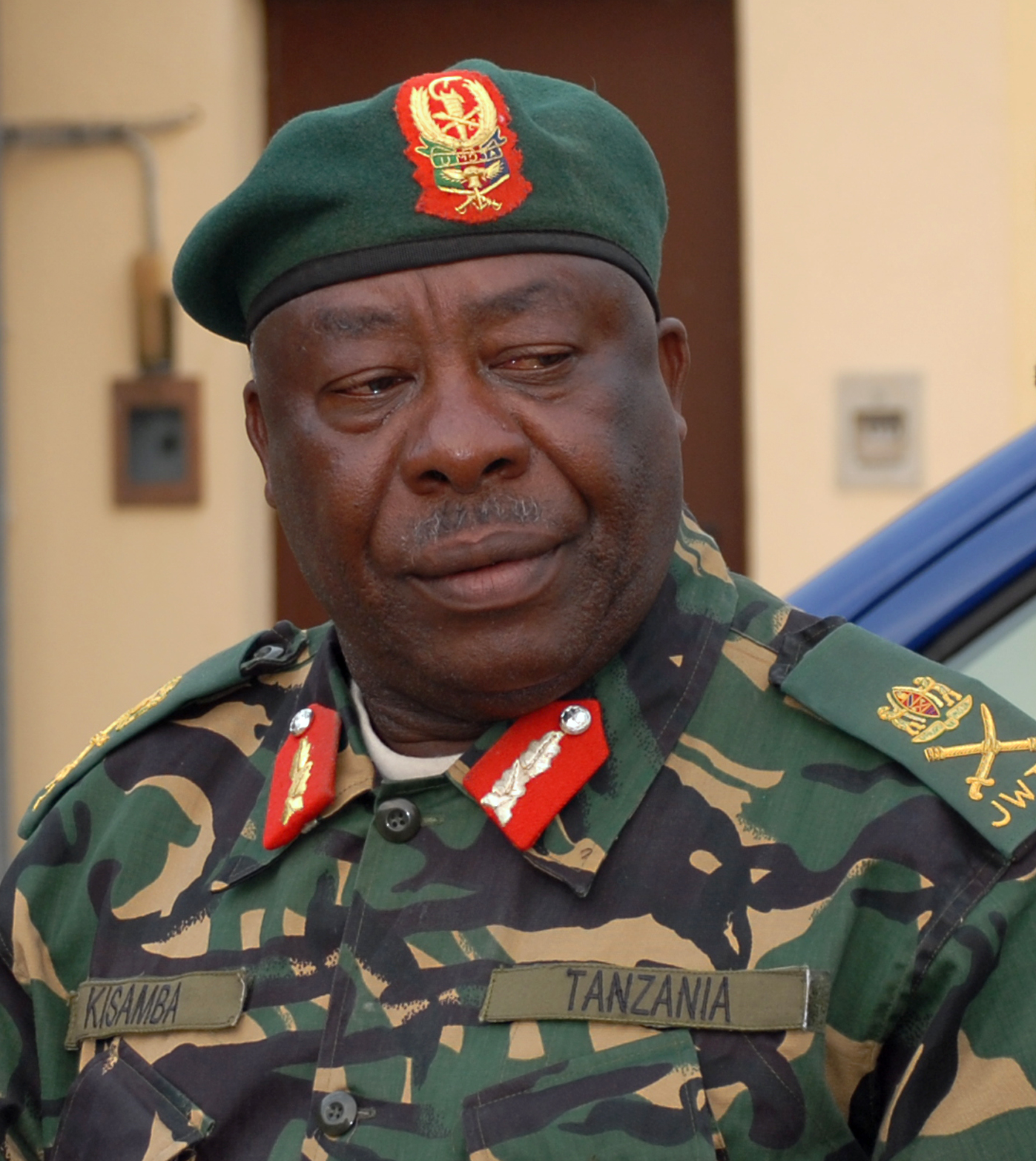

Ambassador of Tanzania to Russia
- Incumbent
- Assumed office November 2014
- Appointed by: Jakaya Kikwete
- Preceded by: Jaka Mwambi

Personal details
- Born: 5 March 1953 (age 73)
- Children: 3
- Education: NDU Nairobi

Military service
- Allegiance: United Rep. of Tanzania
- Branch/service: Tanzanian Army
- Years of service: 1976–2014
- Rank: Lieutenant General
- Commands: TPDF Land Forces
- Battles/wars: AU Operation Democracy

Wynjones Mathew Kisamba (born 5 March 1953) is a Tanzanian retired Lieutenant General and diplomat.

He served as the Deputy Force Commander of the African Union – United Nations Hybrid Operation in Darfur (UNAMID).

== Honours ==
Order	Country	Year
Medal for Long Service	Tanzania	
Medal for Exemplary Service	Tanzania	
War Medal	Tanzania	1979
Kagera Medal	Tanzania	
