= Embassy of South Korea, Moscow =

Coordinates: 55.7379°N 37.5750°E

Embassy of the Republic of Korea to Russia
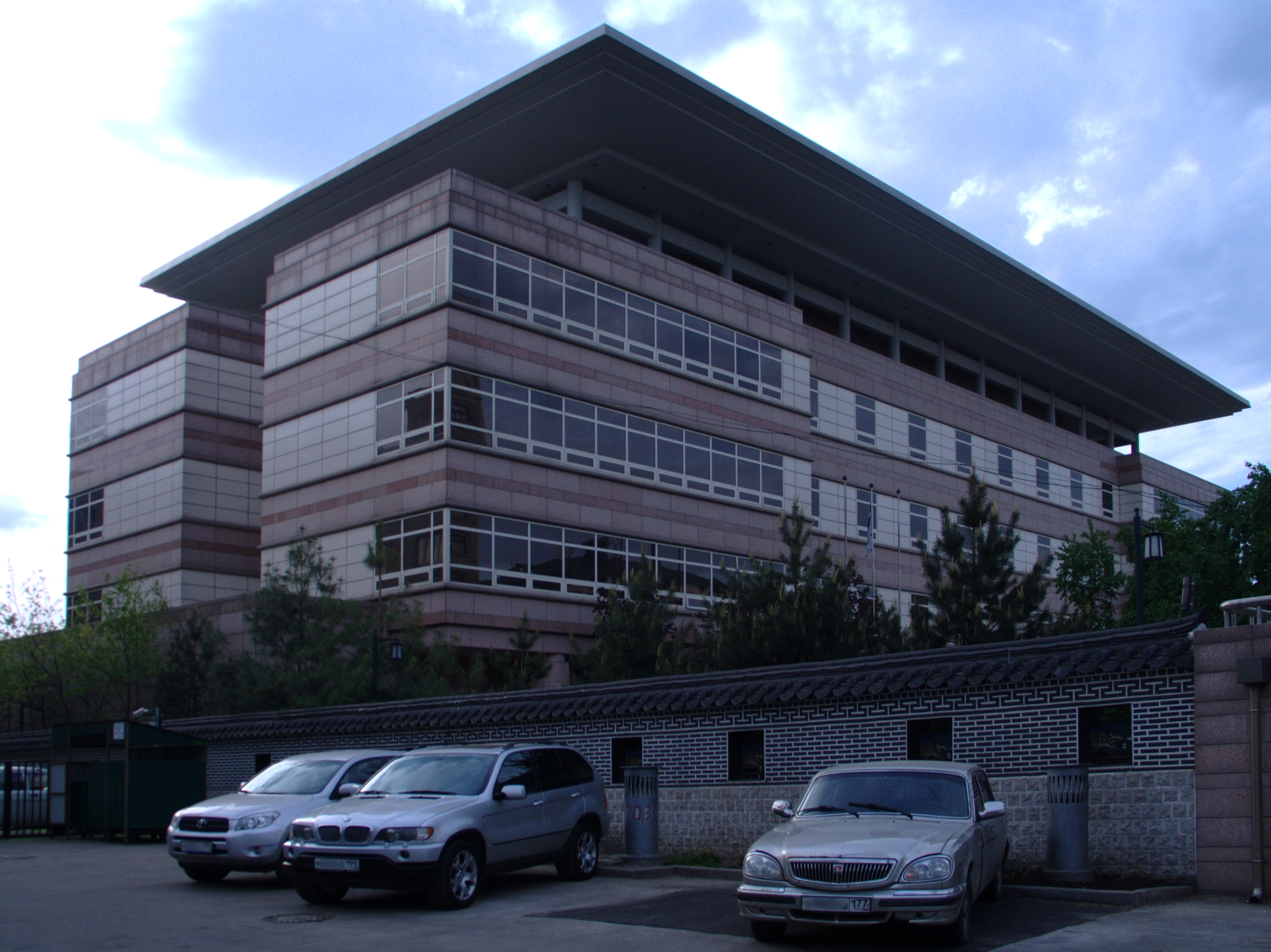
- Location: Moscow, Russia
- Address: 56 Plyushchikha Street, Khamovniki District
- Ambassador: Lee Do Hoon
- Jurisdiction: Russia, Armenia
- Website: https://overseas.mofa.go.kr/ru-ru/index.do

Korean name
- Hangul: 주러시아 대한민국 대사관
- Hanja: 駐러시아大韓民國大使館
- RR: Jureosia Daehanminguk daesagwan
- MR: Churŏsia Taehanmin'guk taesagwan

The Embassy of the Republic of Korea in Moscow is the chief diplomatic mission of South Korea in the Russian Federation. It is located at 56 Plyushchikha Street (Russian: ул. Плющиха, 56) in the Khamovniki District of Moscow.

== Organization ==
The embassy consists of the following sections:

- Political Section
- Management Section
- Economic Affairs Section
- Public Affairs Section
- Consular Section
- Consulate General
  - Consulate General of the Republic of Korea in Vladivostok
  - Consulate General of the Republic of Korea in Saint Petersburg
  - Consulate General of the Republic of Korea in Irkutsk

== Ambassadors ==
Relations between Russia and Korea dates back to 1896, when Min Yŏnghwan was appointed as the special minister to the Russian Empire in Saint Petersburg. Russo-Korean relations ceased in 1905 after Korea was effectively annexed and became a protectorate to the Empire of Japan under the Japan–Korea Treaty of 1905.

In 1990, along with the concept of Nordpolitik, South Korea and the Soviet Union decided to re-establish diplomatic ties.

Since 1990, South Korea decided to install an embassy in Moscow, followed with different consulate generals in Vladivostok, Saint Petersburg, and Irkutsk.

The first ambassador to Russia was Gong Ro-Myung. The position of Republic of Korea Ambassador to Russia is currently appointed to Lee Seok-bae, who held the same position during the Moon Jae-in administration.

== See also ==
- Russia–South Korea relations
- Diplomatic missions in Russia
- Embassy of Russia, Seoul
  - Consulate-General of Russia, Busan

== Gallery ==
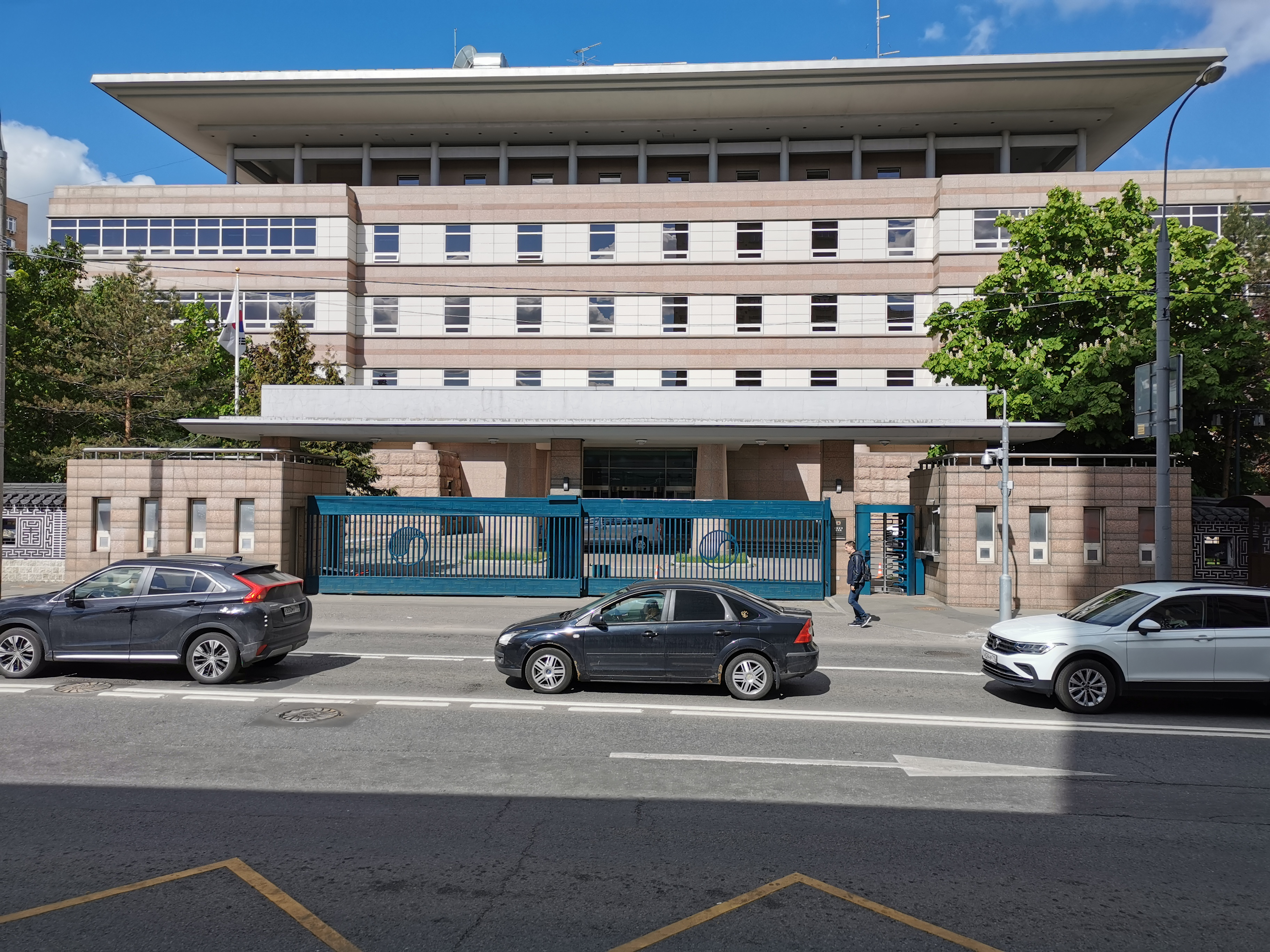
Korean embassy front view

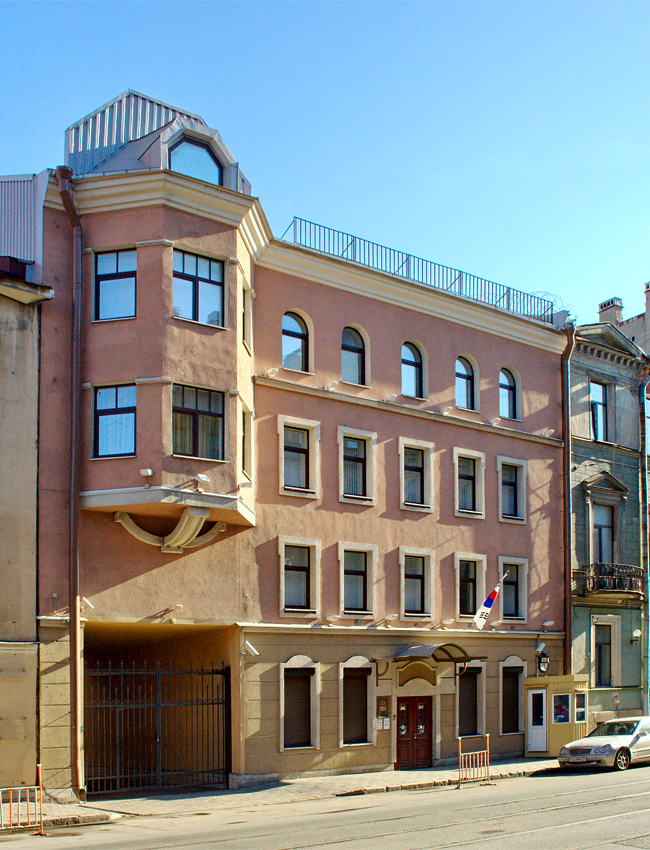
Consulate General of South Korea in St.Petersburg
