= Embassy of Tanzania, Moscow =

Coordinates: 55°44′22″N 37°37′43″E

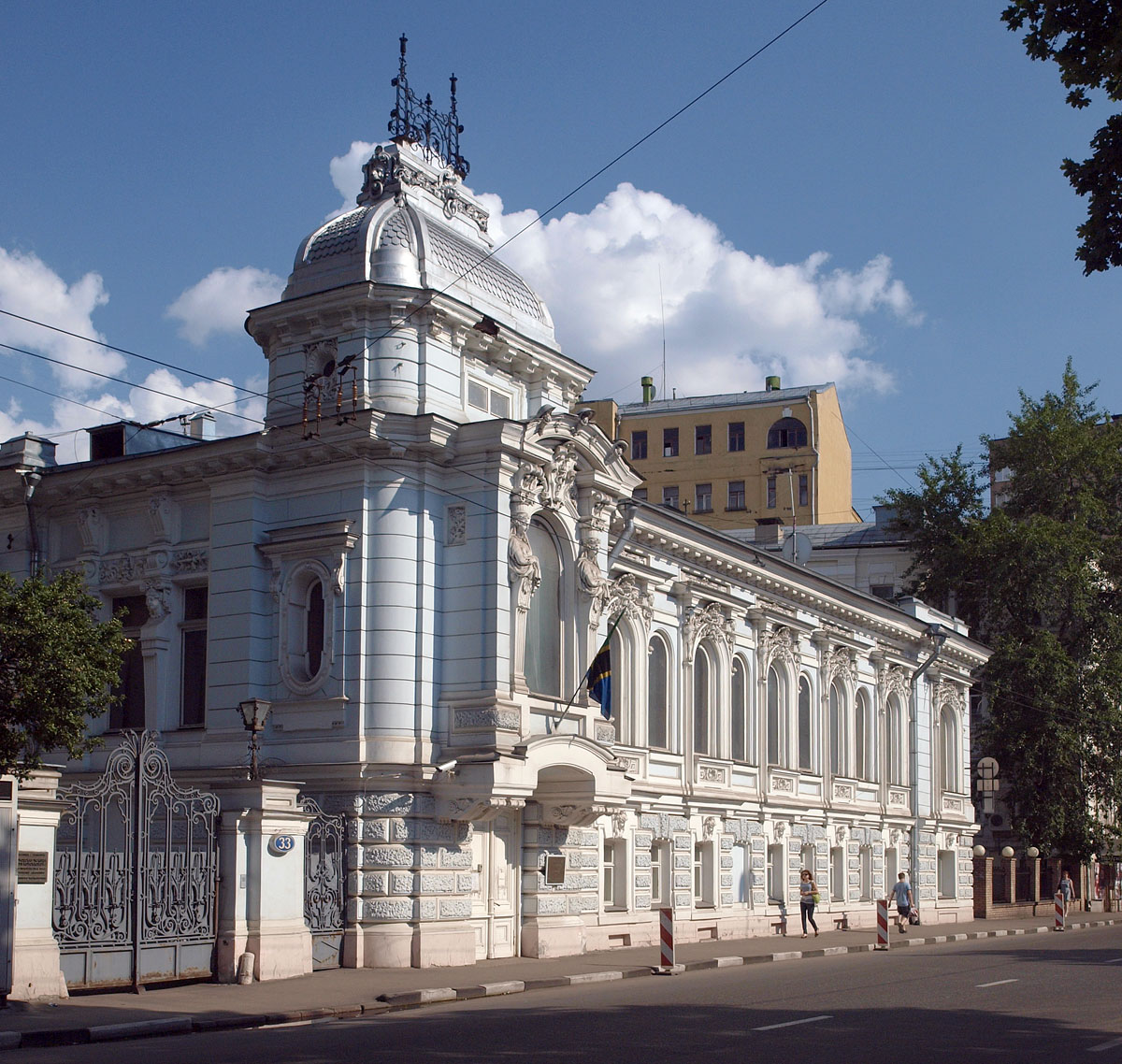
- Location: Zamoskvorechye District
- Address: 33 Pyatnitskaya Street
- Ambassador: Wynjones Kisamba
- Website: www.tanzania.ru

The Embassy of the United Republic of Tanzania in Moscow is the diplomatic mission of Tanzania in the Russian Federation. It is located in embassy quarter on Bol'shaya Nikitskaja Str., house #51, that was previously occupied by the embassy of Morocco. Prior to 2013, the Tanzanian embassy was located at 33 Pyatnitskaya Street (Russian: Пятницкая ул., 33) in the Zamoskvorechye District of Moscow.

The old Embassy occupied a listed memorial building - Korobkova House - built in two stages in 1890s. The oldest, northern part of the building contains a two-story core, built in 1866 and rebuilt in ornate late eclecticism by Lev Kekushev (1890–1894). In the same decade, the owners acquired an adjacent southern lot and hired Sergey Schutzmann to expand the building from Kekushev's 21×23 to 30×23 meters. The annex, completed in 1899, corresponds to the three southernmost windows on the main facade. Instead of expanding Kekushev's original artwork to the south annex, Schutzmann completely redesigned the facade, radically changing its appearance.

For a short period following relocation of Academy of Sciences from Leningrad to Moscow (1934) the building was a residence of the academy's Presidents Alexander Karpinsky (1935–1936) and Vladimir Komarov (1936–1945). Korobkova House was most recently renovated in 2000–2001.

== See also ==
- Russia–Tanzania relations
- Diplomatic missions in Russia
- Diplomatic missions of Tanzania
