= Embassy of Turkmenistan, Moscow =

Diplomatic mission of Turkmenistan to the Russian Federation

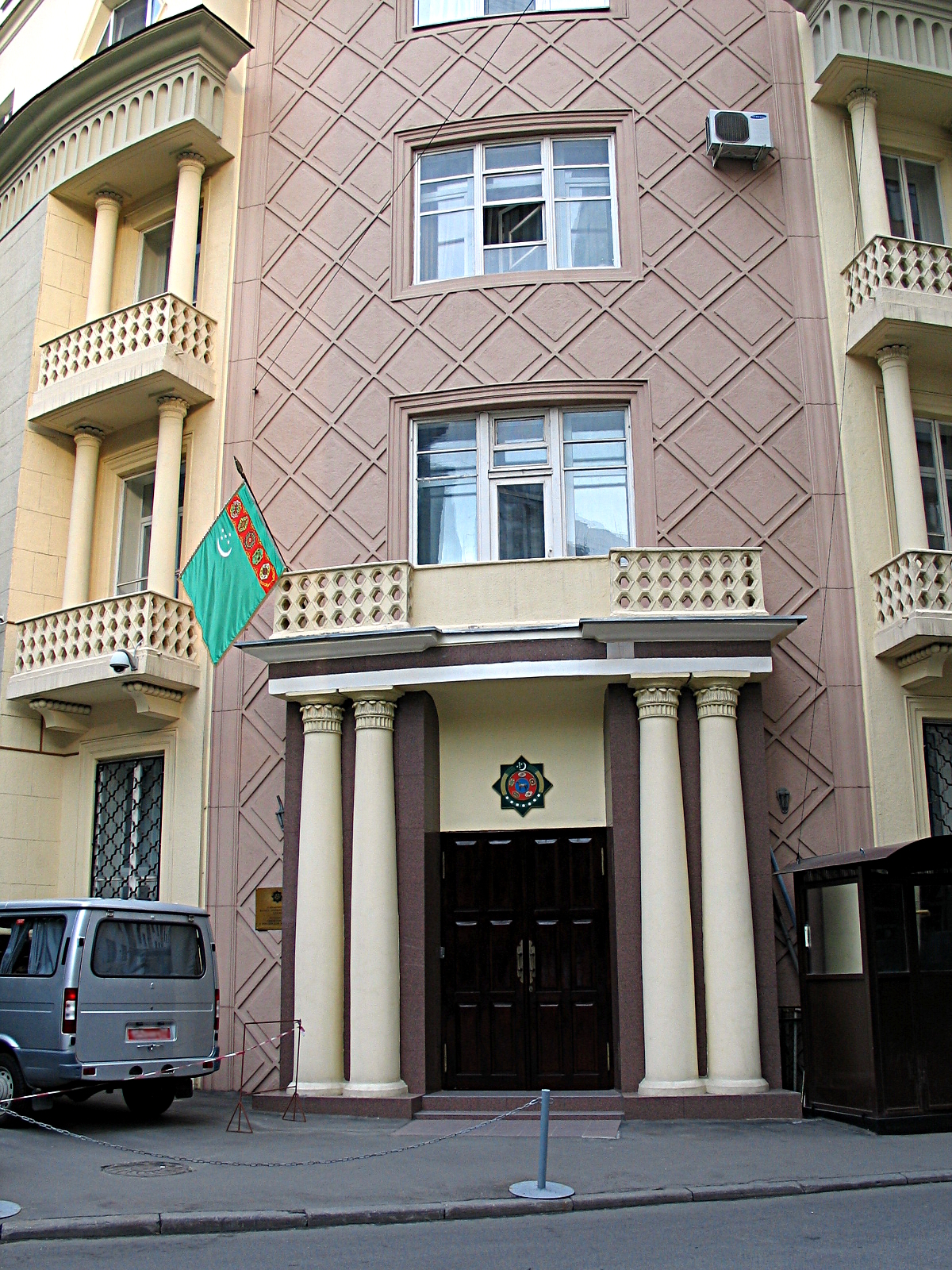
- Location: Moscow
- Address: Moscow, Filippovskiy lane 22
- Coordinates: 55.7394°N 37.6287°E
- Ambassador: Esen Muhammedowiç Aýdogdyýew
- Website: https://russia.tmembassy.gov.tm/

The Embassy of Turkmenistan in Moscow (Turkmen: Türkmenistanyň Russiýadaky ilçihanasy) is the diplomatic mission of Turkmenistan to the Russian Federation. It is located at Moscow, Filippovskiy lane 22. The current Ambassador is Esen Aýdogdyýew.

The building was constructed in 1908 as an apartment house (architect Georgy Evlanov) and was later rebuilt.

== History ==
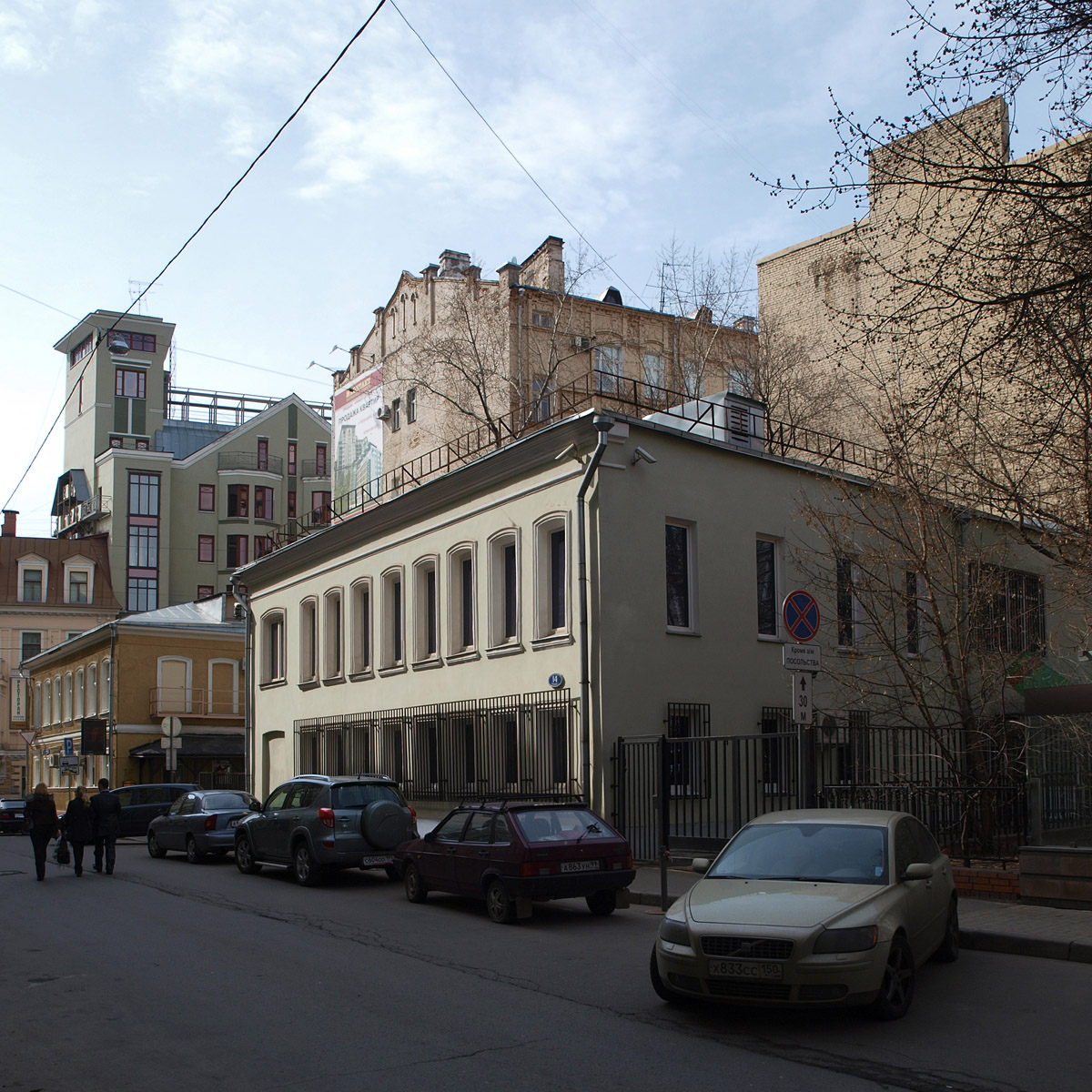
Consulate of Turkmenistan in Moscow

Diplomatic relations between Turkmenistan and the Russian Federation were established on April 8, 1992.

== Ambassadors ==
- Khalnazar Agakhanov (1999–2012)
- Berdymurad Rejepov (2012–2016)
- Batyr Niyazliev (2016–2023)
- Esen Aýdogdyýew (since 2023)

== Outside Moscow ==
In 2013, Turkmenistan opened a consulate in Astrakhan.

The Consulate General of Turkmenistan in Kazan was opened in 2020.

== See also ==
- Russia–Turkmenistan relations
- Diplomatic missions in Russia
- Diplomatic missions of Turkmenistan
- Embassy of Russia in Turkmenistan
