= Consulate General of Japan, Saint Petersburg =

Diplomatic mission of Japan to Russia

Consulate-General of Japan in Saint Petersburg Генеральное консульство Японии в Санкт-Петербурге 在サンクトペテルブルク日本国総領事館
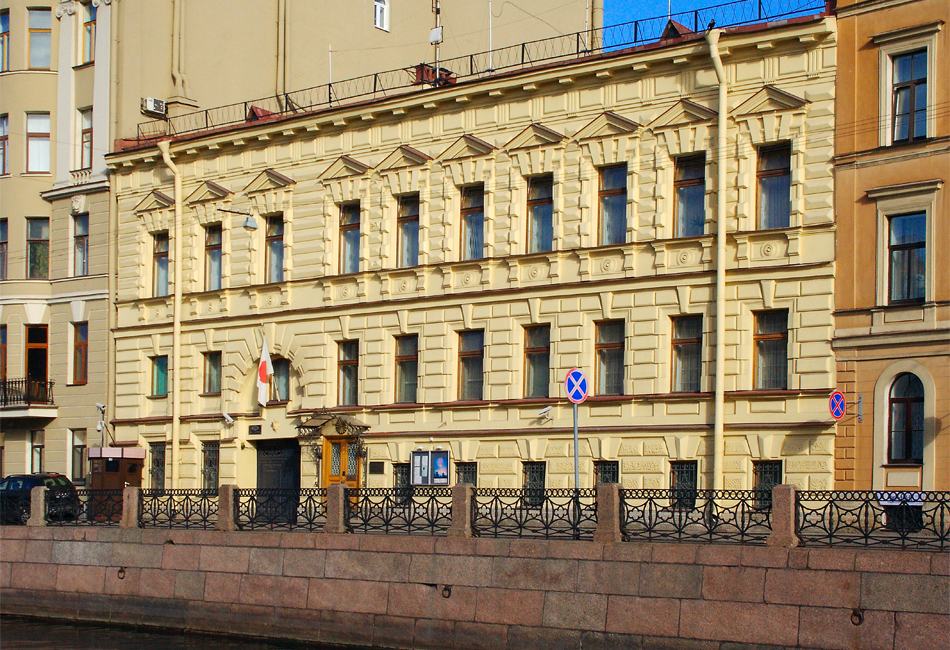
- Location: Saint Petersburg
- Address: 29 Nabereznaya Reki Moiki
- Coordinates: 59°56′29.043″N 30°19′12.777″E

The Consulate-General of Japan in Saint Petersburg is the consulate of Japan in Saint Petersburg, Russia. It is located at 29 Nabereznaya Reki Moiki (Russian: Набережная реки Мойки, 29) in the Tsentralny district of Saint Petersburg.

The building was constructed in 1851 for Aleksey Lobanov-Rostovsky, with reconstructions and extensions in 1868 and 1875.

The decision to open a consulate-general in Leningrad, as it was then named, was taken by the Japanese cabinet following a bill passed in the Diet. This happened on 30 March 1971 with effect from April 1. This was part of a consular agreement in which consulates were also opened in Osaka, Sapporo and Nakhodka.

== See also ==
- Japan–Russia relations
- Diplomatic missions in Russia
