= All-Russian Research Institute for Civil Defense and Emergencies of the Ministry of Emergency Situations =

Research institute in Russia

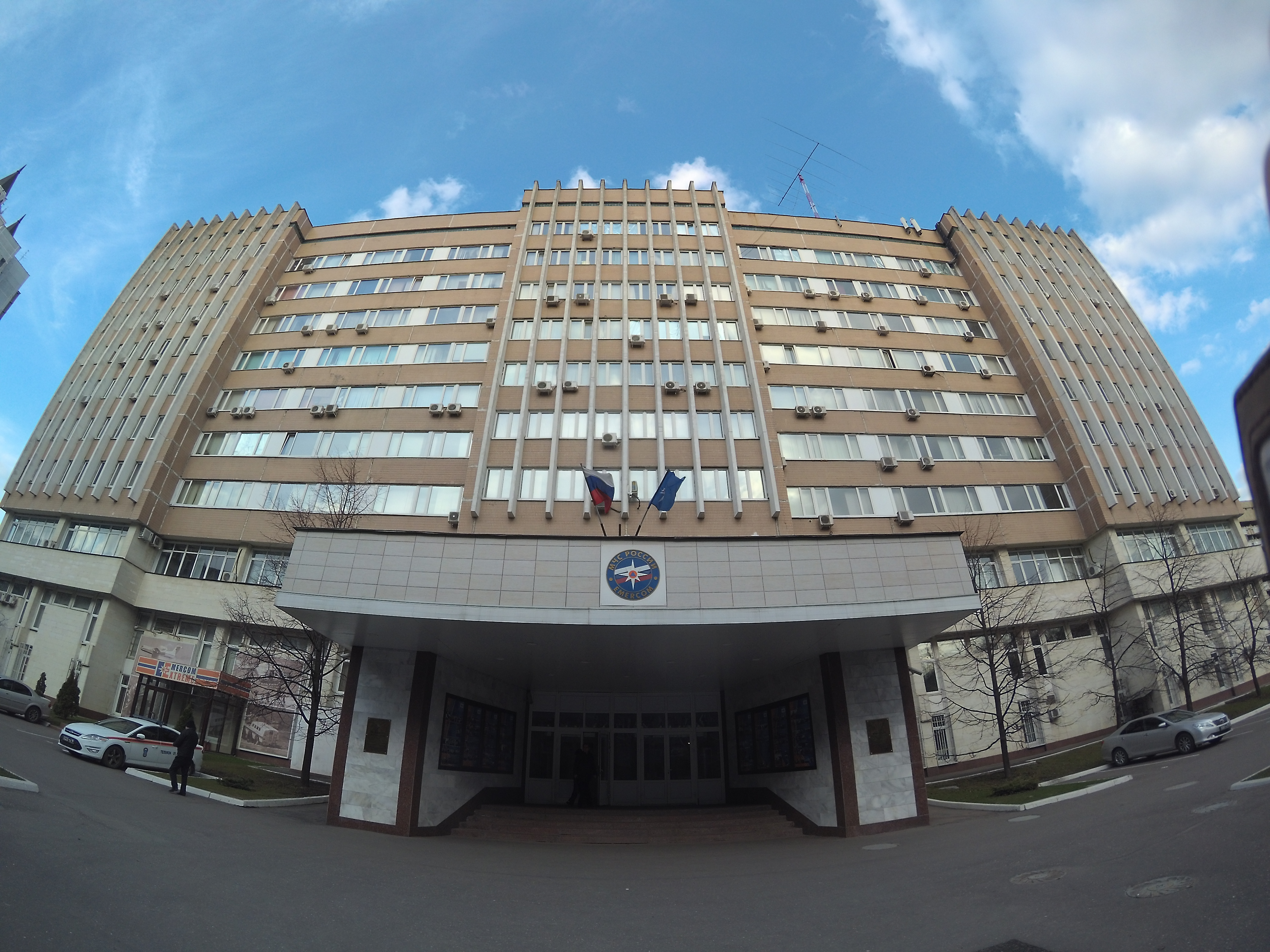
- Owner: Russian Ministry of Emergency Situations
- Address: 7 Davydovskaya str.
- Location: Moscow, Russia
- Coordinates: 55°43′30″N 37°28′46″E

All-Russian Research Institute for Civil Defense and Emergencies of the Ministry of Emergency Situations of Russia (Russian: Всероссийский научно-исследовательский институт по проблемам гражданской обороны и чрезвычайных ситуаций МЧС России) is a federal state budgetary institution, successor of the All-Union Scientific Research Institute of Civil Defense. It is the leading organization in Russia for scientific support of work related to civil defense, prevention and elimination of consequences of emergency situations. It is located in 7 Davydovskaya street in Ramenki District, Moscow.

== History ==
The institute was established on December 1, 1976, by resolution of the Central Committee of the Communist Party of the Soviet Union and the Council of Ministers of the Soviet Union dated March 18, 1976, for the purpose of conducting scientific research on the problems of increasing the sustainability of the functioning of the national economy of the country in wartime. In pursuance of the order of the Minister of Defense of the USSR, the Chief of the Civil Defense of the Soviet Union (Russian: Начальник войск ГО) issued an order on October 16, 1976, on the formation of the All-Russian Research Institute of Civil Defense.

In February 1978, by order of the head of the Civil Defense of the USSR, the Scientific and Technical Council was created and its personnel was determined. In order to perform the functions of coordinating scientific research on the problems of increasing the sustainability of the functioning of the national economy of the country in wartime, by order of the head of the Civil Defense of the USSR in 1978, the "Regulation on the Interdepartmental Coordinating Scientific and Technical Council" was put into effect, and a list of the ministries and departments of the USSR and union republics coordinated by the Scientific and Technical Council was announced. In 1979, the postgraduate and full-time graduate programs were created and staffed.

To a certain extent, many activities were implemented through control by the USSR State Planning Committee with the participation of the Civil Defense Headquarters of the country and the institute over the development of special sections of five-year plans for the social and economic development of industries and union republics. The current situation in the country, associated with the accident at the Chernobyl Nuclear Power Plant, required a certain reorientation of the directions of scientific research. This was reflected in the plan for nationwide comprehensive research for 1986-1990 and in subsequent additions to it. The main feature of the period of scientific and production activity of the institute under consideration is the direct participation of its employees in the liquidation of the consequences of the accident at the Chernobyl Nuclear Power Plant.

After a number of serious disasters, mainly the Chernobyl nuclear power plant accident (1986) and the 1988 Armenian earthquake the efforts of the scientific team of the institute were aimed at developing measures to protect the population from the consequences of accidents, catastrophes and natural disasters, as well as methods for organizing and conducting civil defense in these conditions. Following the dissolution of the Soviet Union and in accordance with the Resolution of the Government of Russia of December 29, 1992 No. 968, the institute became the leading scientific organization of the Ministry of Emergency Situations of Russia on issues of civil defense, prevention and elimination of emergency situations. The institute was entrusted with the tasks of developing the theoretical foundations of the safety of the population and territories, assessing the complex risk of emergency situations, developing federal target and scientific and technical programs aimed at preventing and eliminating emergency situations, developing tactical and technical requirements for technical means and technologies for conducting emergency rescue and other urgent work.

In 2002, the institute was awarded the status of a federal center of science and high technology (Resolution of the Government of the Russian Federation of August 20, 2002, No. 619).
