= Jaka Mwambi =

Tanzanian politician and diplomat (1950–2019)

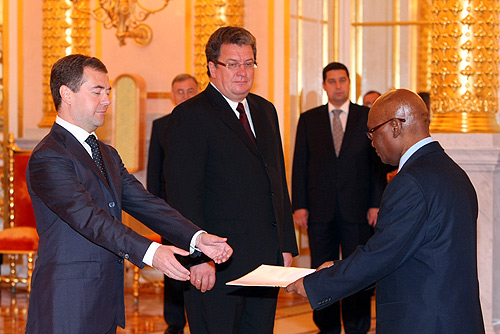
- Presenting his credentials to President Medvedev

Tanzanian Ambassador to Russia
- In office July 2008 – 2014
- Appointed by: Jakaya Kikwete
- Succeeded by: Wynjones Kisamba

Personal details
- Born: 21 August 1950 Mgeta, Morogoro, Tanganyika Territory
- Died: 7 December 2019 (aged 69) Dar es Salaam
- Party: CCM
- Children: 5
- Education: UDSM

Jaka Mgwabi Mwambi was a Tanzanian politician and diplomat.

== Career ==
Mwambi is a former Regional Commissioner of Rukwa Region, Tanga Region and Iringa Region and was Deputy Secretary-General of the Chama Cha Mapinduzi party, until he was replaced by George Mkuchika, a Member of Parliament from Newala district, in November 2007.

Mwambi was appointed as the Ambassador of the United Republic of Tanzania to the Russian Federation, and presented his credentials to the Russian Ministry of Foreign Affairs on 24 July 2008, and to President Dmitry Medvedev on 18 September 2008.
