= Russia–Tanzania relations =

- Russia: Tanzania

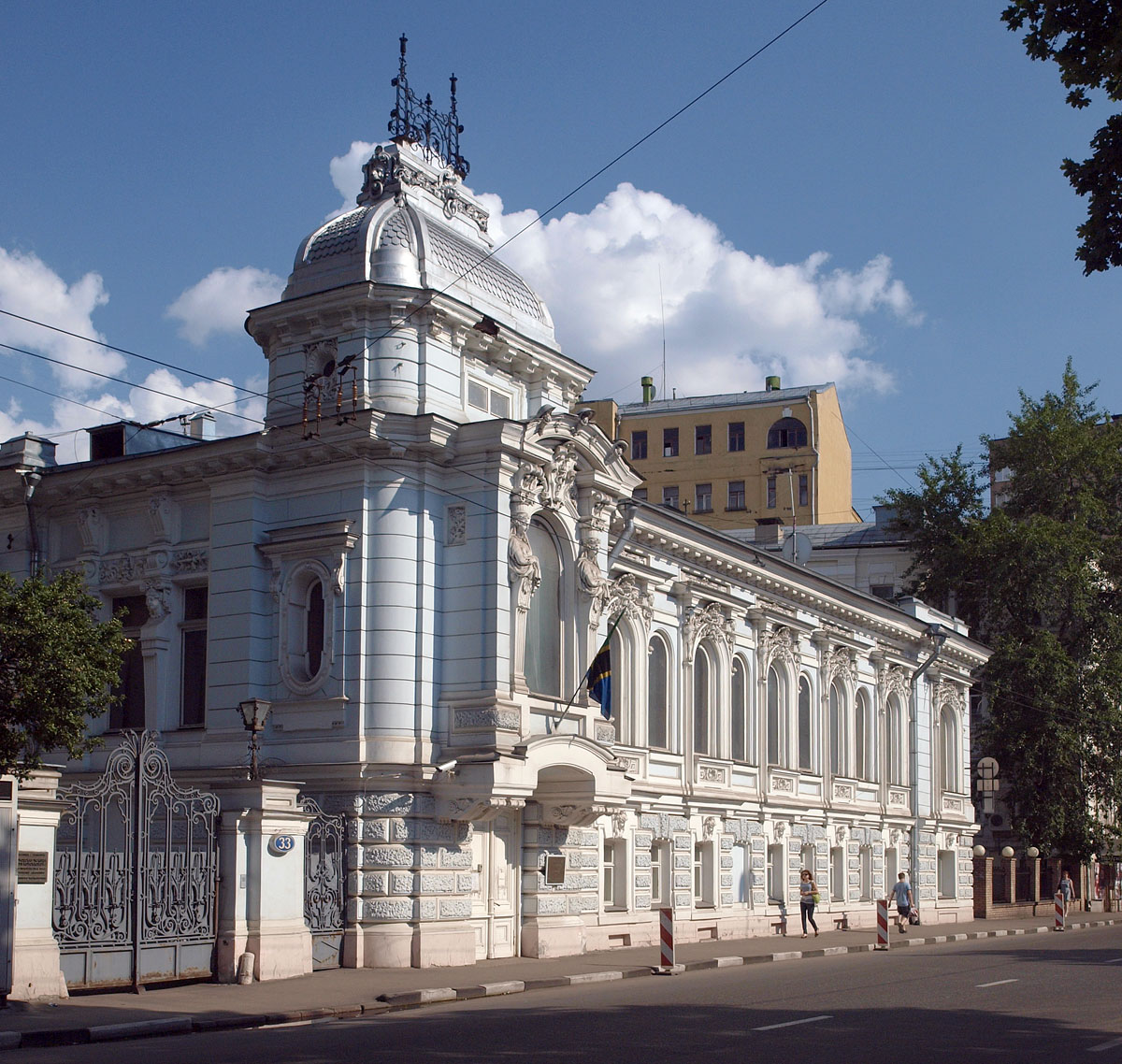
Embassy of Tanzania in Moscow

Russia–Tanzania relations (Russian: Российско-танзанийские отношения) are the bilateral relations between Russia and Tanzania. Both countries established diplomatic relations on December 11, 1961. Russia has an embassy in Dar es Salaam, and Tanzania has an embassy in Moscow.

== Diplomatic interactions ==
In June 1995, a protocol on ministerial consultations, the next round of which was held in May 2009 in Dar es Salaam. In July 2008, on the sidelines of the G8 Summit in Japan, President Dmitry Medvedev and President Jakaya Kikwete held a brief conversation.

On 9 February 2026, ambassador Mahmoud Thabit Kombo of Tanzania's Ministry of Foreign Affairs and East African Cooperation, travelled to Moscow on a diplomatic mission to deepen strategic collaboration between the two countries. During the visit, Minister Kombo met with Maxim Reshetnikov, the Minister of Economic Development, and Sergey Lavrov, the Russian Foreign Minister, to discuss growing trade and investment between Tanzania and Russia in important economic areas. The mission's main goal was to deliver a special message from President Samia Suluhu Hassan to President Vladimir Putin to reaffirm Tanzania's commitment to strengthening bilateral ties.

== Economics ==
In March 2005, an agreement on cooperation between the Chambers of Commerce of both nations.

== Military/security ==
In 2007, ten employees of the Ministry of Public Security of Tanzania were trained in educational courses of the Russian Interior Ministry.

== Ambassadors ==
=== Ambassadors of Tanzania to Russia ===
- Isaac Abraham Sepetu (1982-1989)
- William Lucas Mbago (1989-?)
- Eva Lilian Nzaro (1998-2002)
- Patrick Chokala (since 2002)

=== Russian/Soviet Ambassadors to Tanzania ===
- Andrey Timoshchenko (1962-1969)
- Vyacheslav Ustinov (1969-1972)
- Sergey Slipchenko (1972-1980)
- Yuri Yukalov (1980-1985)
- Sergei Illarionov (1985-1989)
- Andrey Fialkovsky (1989)
- Vladimir Kuznetsov (1989-1992)
- Kenesh Kulmatov (1992-1997)
- Doku Zavgayev (1997-2004)
- Leonid Safonov (2004-2010)
- Alexander Early (since 2010)

== See also ==
- Foreign relations of Russia
- Foreign relations of Tanzania
