= List House =

Building in Moscow, Russia

Coordinates: 55°44′39″N 37°35′11″E

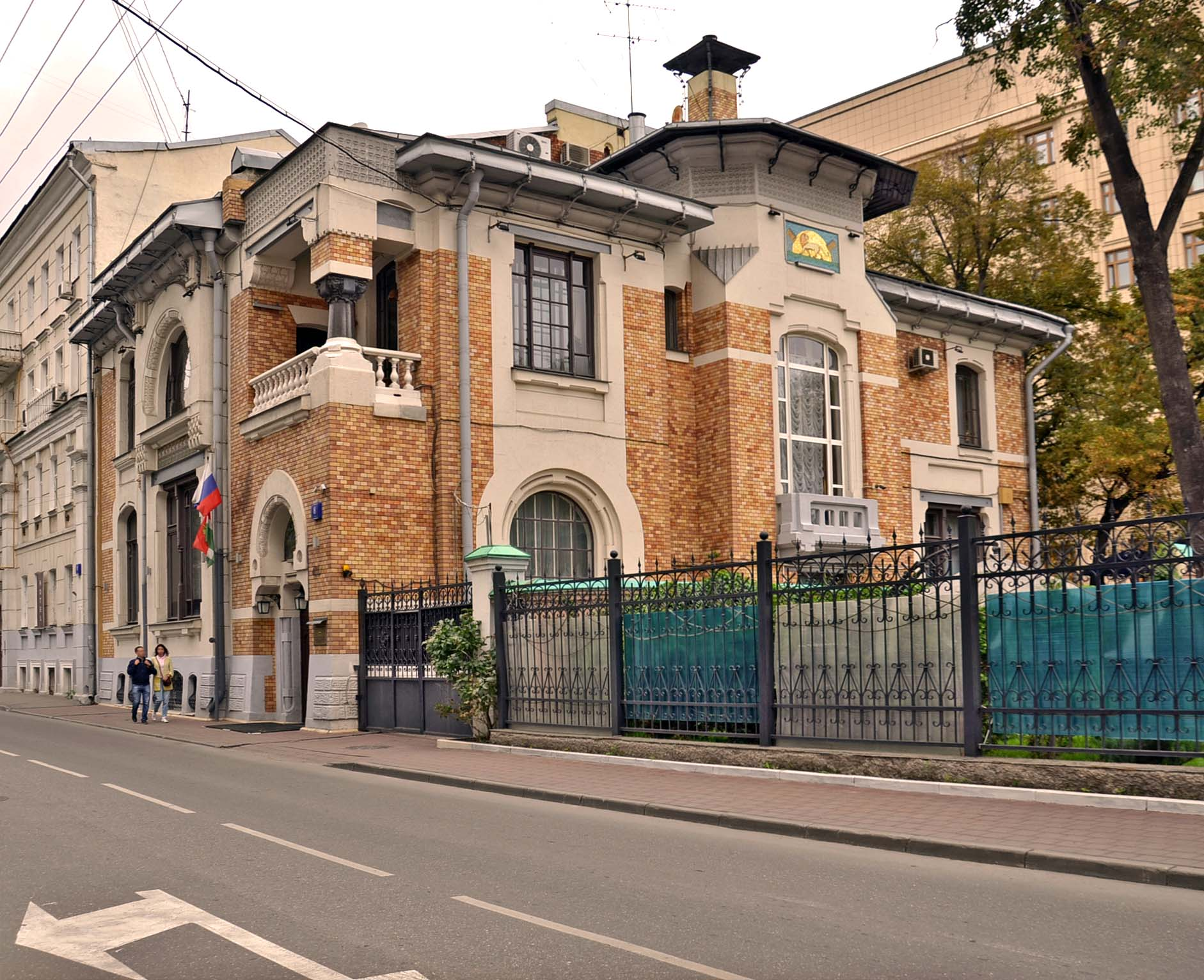
The List House in Moscow

The List House is a residence in Moscow constructed in 1898–1899 by the Russian architect Lev Kekushev. Located at 10 Glasovsky Lane, it was one of the first houses in Moscow built in the Style Moderne, the Russian term for Art Nouveau. It is classified as an historical cultural monument of the Russian Federation.

== History ==
Kekushev had originally designed and built the house as his own home, but sold it in 1900 to Otto Adolfovich List, a Russian industrialist of German ancestry. Sometime after 1910, the house was purchased by Serge Koussevitzky and his wife Nataliya, and it was frequently used for concerts and musical events. Many notable musicians and artists came to the house, including Claude Debussy, Sergei Rachmaninov, Alexander Glazunov, Sergei Prokofiev, Feodor Chaliapin, and the writer Boris Pasternak.

Early in the 20th century, the house was purchased by a Russian industrialist, Aleksey Meshchersky. Following the Russian Revolution in 1917, it was nationalized, and was originally used as school or children's shelter. It then became the Embassy of Argentina. Presently it is occupied by the representative of Kaluga Oblast to the Government of the Russian Federation.

== Decoration ==
Kekushev was familiar with the Art Nouveau houses work of Victor Horta in Brussels, such as the Hotel Tassel, and the facade of List House shows a similar treatment of volume, and the use of a highly decorated staircase as a central element. The facades feature floral mosaic decoration by the British architect and decorator William Walcot. Over the decades and many different owners, much of the original interior decoration has disappeared, but restoration of the grand stairway and other features has been undertaken since the 1990s.

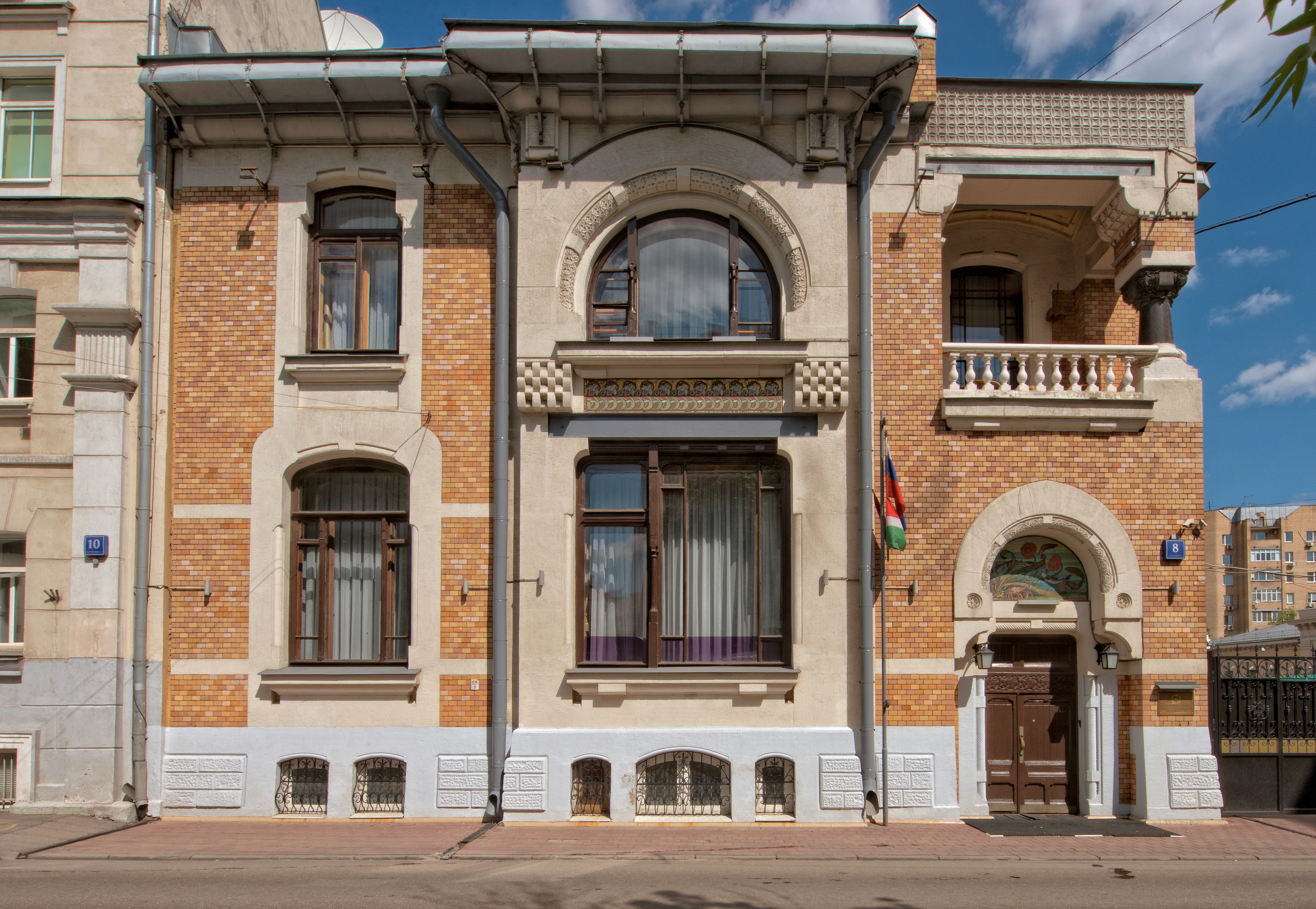
Facade of the List House

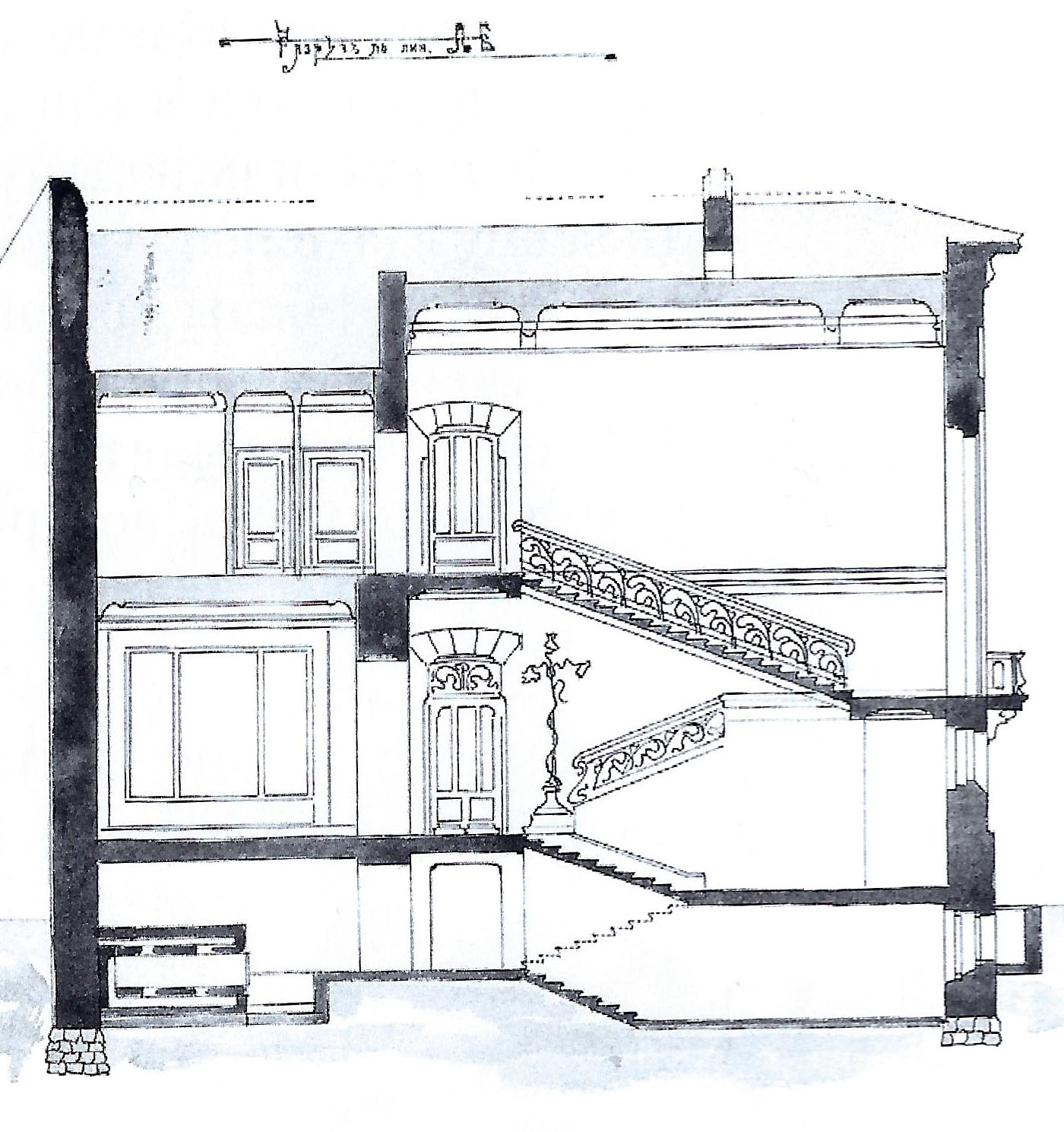
Plan of the interior stairway

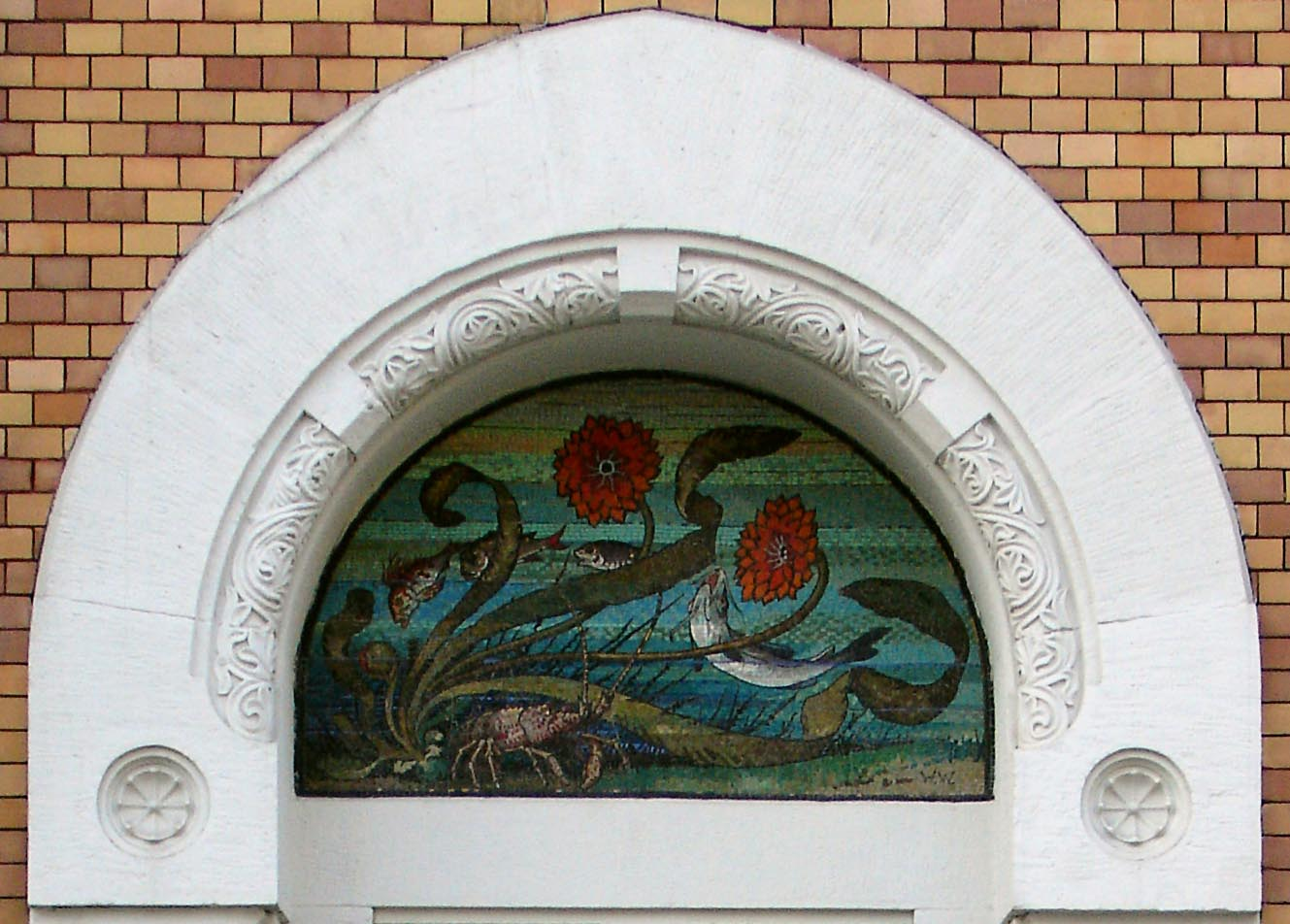
Sculptural decoration over door by William Walcot

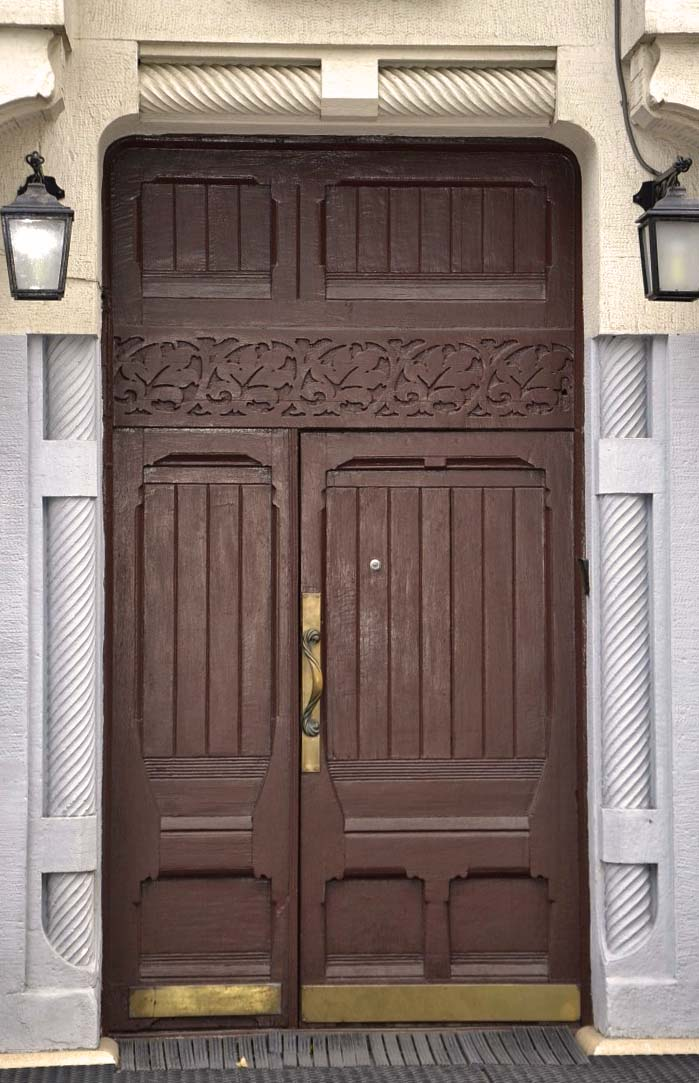
Decoration over the front door

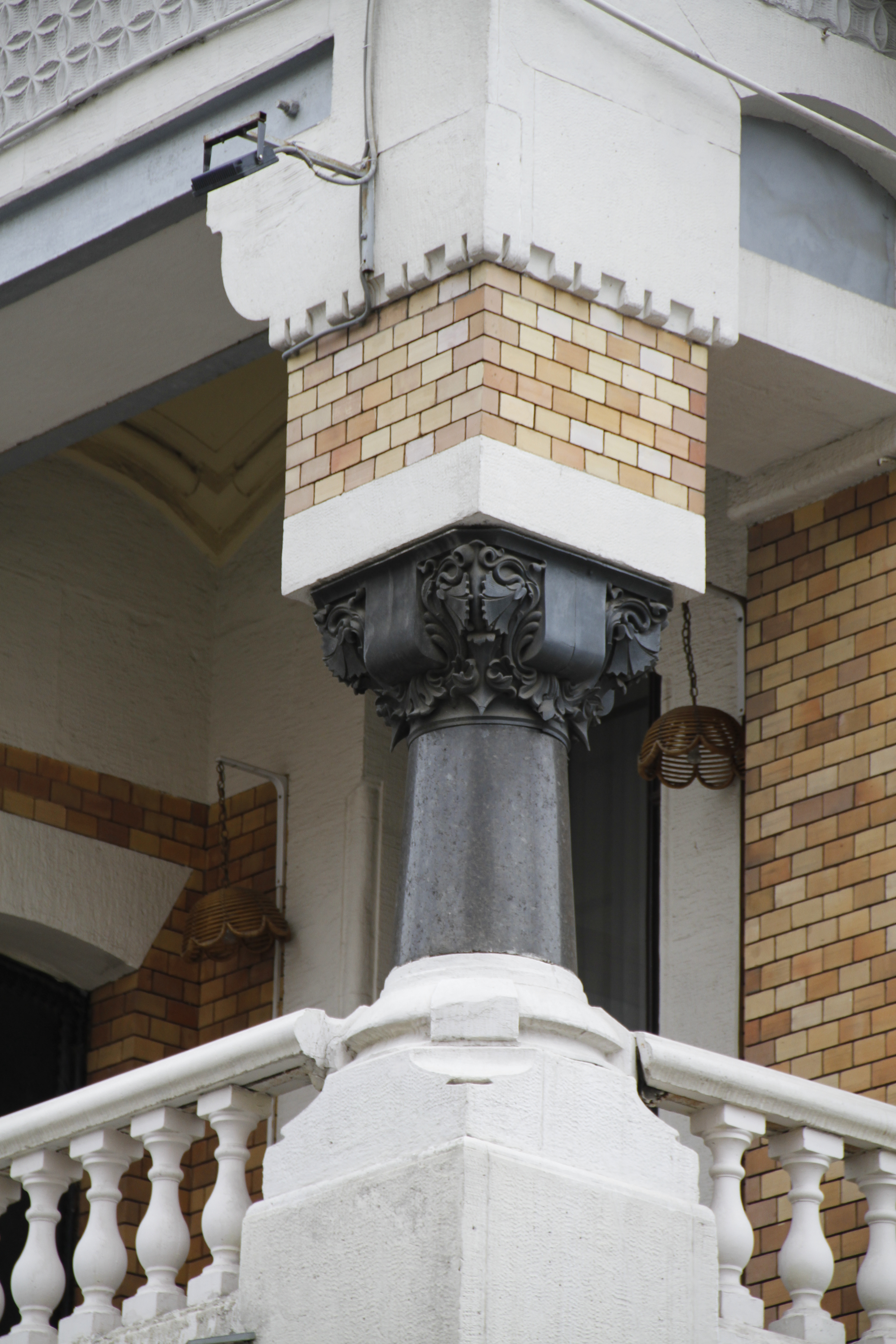
Balcony corner

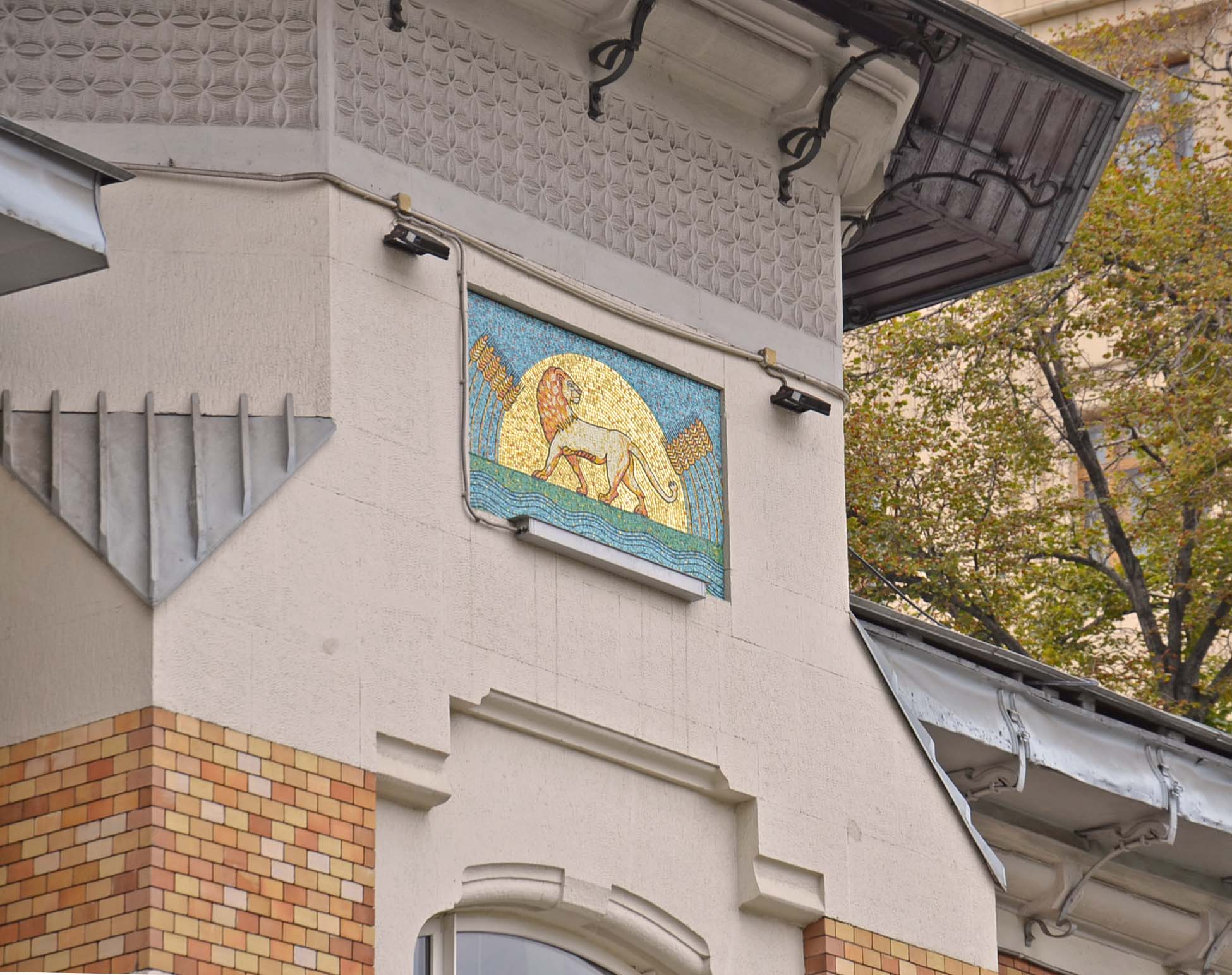
Corner detail with "Lev", or lion, after archirect's name

== Bibliography ==
- William Craft Brumfield, "The Origins of Modernism in Russian Architecture", University of California Press, 1991 contents chapter 3

== See also ==
- Art Nouveau architecture in Russia
