= Russia–South Korea relations =

- Russia: South Korea

Diplomatic mission
- Embassy of Russia, Seoul: Korean Embassy, Moscow

Envoy
- Ambassador Georgy Zinoviev: Ambassador Lee Seok-bae(Appointed)

Russia–South Korea relations (Russian: Российско-южнокорейские отношения, Rossiisko-yuzhnokoreyskie otnosheniya, Korean: 한러 관계, hanreo gwangye) or Russian–South Korean relations are the bilateral foreign relations between Russia and South Korea. Modern relations between the two countries began on September 30, 1990. Due to the 2022 Russian invasion of Ukraine, relations became very tense after South Korea imposed sanctions against Russia. Russia placed South Korea on a list of "unfriendly countries", Immediately following Japan's 1910-1945 colonial rule of Korea, the Cold War between the Soviet Union and the United States created the division of Korea into North and South states. Thereafter, since the two sides were separated by North Korea and opposing ideologies, there was little contact until the dissolution of the Soviet Union.

Since the 1990s, there has been greater trade and cooperation between the two nations. The total trade volume between South Korea and Russia in 2003 was 4.2 billion US dollars, which increased to 24.8 billion US dollars in 2018.

== History ==
=== Russian Empire ===
The Russian Empire and Korea first established formal diplomatic relations in 1884, after which Russia exerted considerable political influence in Korea. In particular, in 1896, the Korean royal family took refuge from pro-Japanese factions in Seoul at the Russian diplomatic compound. After the defeat of Russia in the Russo-Japanese War, however, Russian influence in Korea fell to near zero.

=== Soviet Union ===
South Korea–Soviet Union relations
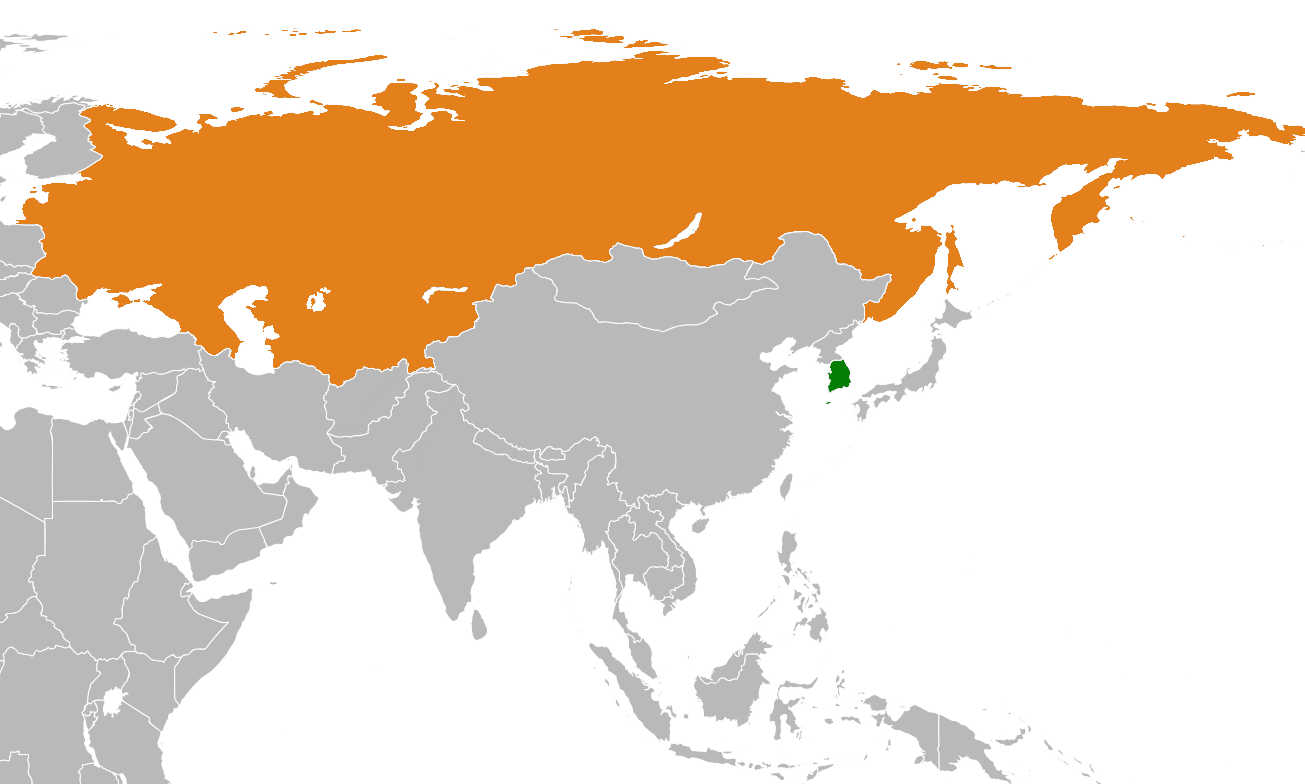

- South Korea: Soviet Union

Soviet Russia and later the Soviet Union had diplomatic assistance to the Provisional Government of the Republic of Korea, the forerunner to the present day Republic of Korea, which served as a government in exile during the Japanese occupation of the country. As they resisted the Japanese, its manpower diminished when they attempted to reorganize their forces in Svobodny, Amur Oblast. The Bolsheviks believed them to be a liability to the Soviet Russia during the Russian Civil War when the Japanese joined forces with the White Army and forced them disarm and join the Red Army. But they refused and the Red Army massacred them at Svobodny.

During the Cold War, until 1970, relations between the two countries were generally hostile, due to the Soviet Union supporting China and North Korea during the Korean War. The United States maintained military bases and nuclear weapons in South Korea, which the Soviet Union viewed as a threat to its security. In September 1983, a Soviet fighter jet shot down Korean Air Lines Flight 007 as it veered into Soviet airspace by mistake.

South Korea had been seeking to trade with the Soviet Union even before Gorbachev came to power. Gorbachev desired foreign capital and high technology, as well as Seoul's help in alleviating the Soviet economic crisis through direct investment, joint ventures, and trade. As early as May 1979, South Korea signed an agreement obtaining Finnish assistance in exporting to the Soviet Union and Eastern Europe.

In the 1980s, South Korean President Roh Tae-woo's Nordpolitik and Mikhail Gorbachev's "New Thinking" were both attempts to reverse their nations' recent histories. Gorbachev had signaled Soviet interest in improving relations with all countries in the Asia-Pacific region, including South Korea, as explained in his July 1986 Vladivostok and August 1988 Krasnoyarsk speeches.

The natural resources Seoul increasingly needed—oil, metals, timber, and fish—are abundant in the Soviet Far East. Trade with the Soviet Union, Eastern Europe, and China would also alleviate South Korea's apprehension over the United States' increasing trade protectionism. South Korea's expanding trade with Eastern Europe and the Soviet Union initially was encouraged by the United States, although Washington later became increasingly concerned over possible high-technology transfers.

Improved Seoul-Moscow relations were planned in three related stages: sports, trade, and political relations. The 1988 Seoul Olympics was a major catalyst. Moscow sent more than 6,000 Soviets to South Korea and Soviet tourist ships came to Busan and Incheon and Aeroflot planes landed in Seoul.

On November 10, 1988, the Soviet Politburo, for the first time, reconsidered its relationship with South Korea. Because of the lack of diplomatic relations, most South Korean-Soviet trade initially was indirect; Eastern Europe, Hong Kong, Japan, and Singapore served as intermediaries. With an increasing volume of trade, Seoul and Moscow began trading directly, using facilities near Vladivostok and Busan. The Korea Trade Promotion Corporation (KOTRA) and the Soviet Chamber of Commerce and Industry exchanged a trade memorandum in 1988 pledging mutual assistance in establishing trade offices in 1989. Seoul's trade office in Moscow opened in July 1989; Moscow's trade office in Seoul opened in April 1989. Several major South Korean businesses including Daewoo, Sunkyong, and Lucky-Goldstar traded directly with the Soviet Union in 1990.

South Korea's new-found wealth and technological prowess had been attracting the interest of a growing number of socialist nations. In initiating Nordpolitik, Roh's confidential foreign policy adviser was rumored to have visited Moscow to consult with Soviet policymakers. Kim Young Sam visited Moscow from June 2 to June 10, 1989, as the Kremlin announced that it would allow some 300,000 Soviet-Koreans who had been on the Soviet island of Sahkalin since the end of World War II to return permanently to South Korea. Moscow even arranged Kim's meeting with the North Korean ambassador to the Soviet Union.

In June 1990, Roh held his first summit with President Gorbachev in San Francisco and diplomatic relations between the two countries officially began on September 30, 1990.

=== Russian Federation ===
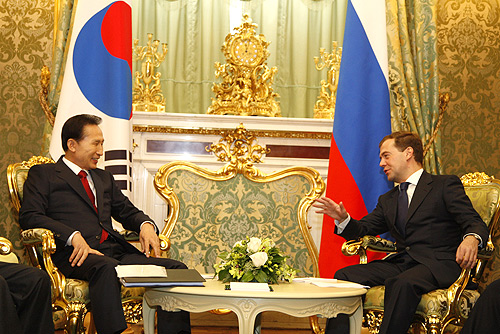
Dmitry Medvedev meeting Lee Myung-bak at the Kremlin

After the collapse of the Soviet Union, South Korea and Russia established diplomatic ties in 1991. On November 20, 1992 Russia and South Korea signed a protocol providing for regular visits of defence officials and naval vessels between the two countries.

On July 23, 1997, during a visit of Russian Foreign Minister Yevgeny Primakov to Seoul, a "hot line" agreement was signed providing for the establishment of a special communications link between the official residences of the Russian and South Korean presidents.

Russian president Vladimir Putin visited Seoul in February 2001, while South Korean president Roh Moo-hyun visited Moscow in September 2004.

South Korea and Russia are participants in the six-party talks on the North Korea's nuclear proliferation issue.

In October 2013, South Korean president Park Geun-hye proposed the "Eurasian Initiative", which projected a unified transport, energy and trade networks across the Eurasian continent, with the goals of enhancing economic cooperation, improving interpersonal ties, building trust, and improving inter-Korean relations through shared prosperity. In November 2013, Russia and South Korea signed a visa exemption agreement.

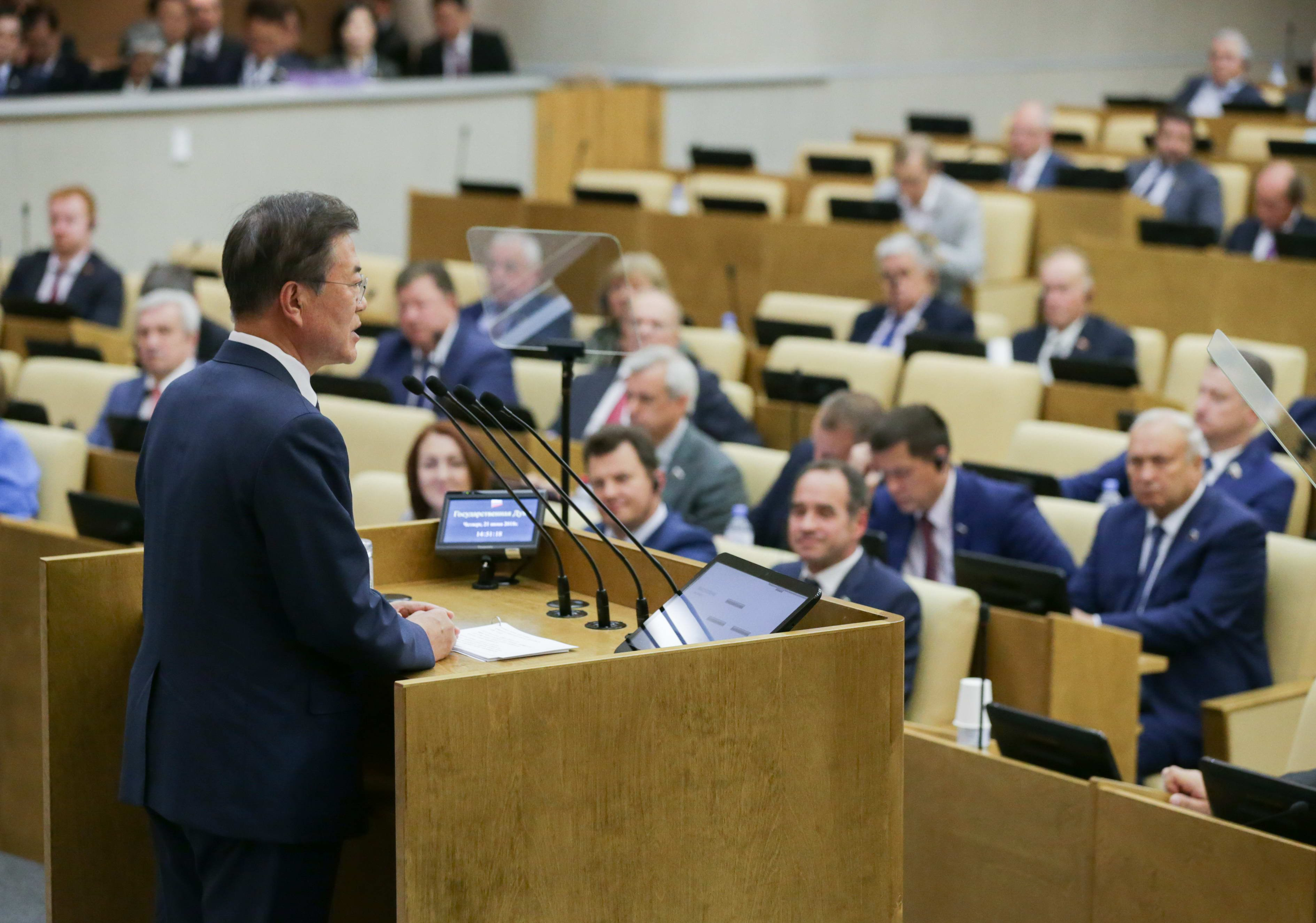
President Moon Jae-in speaks at the State Duma

South Korean president Moon Jae-in paid a state visit to Russia in 2018. On June 21, he addressed the State Duma, the lower house of the Russian Federal Assembly. He became the first South Korean leader to speak in the Russian Parliament. On June 22, Russian President Vladimir Putin held talks with Moon Jae-in in Moscow. Leaders signed a document for foundation of free trade area.

Moon initiated the New Northern Policy that aimed to find new economic growth drivers and reduce South Korea's reliance on traditional major trading partners like the U.S. and China by expanding into new Eurasian markets and aimed to build trust and foundation for future inter-Korean economic cooperation, with projects like connecting the Trans-Siberian Railway with a cross-border inter-Korean railway. Progress on the policy was significantly hindered by the international sanctions regime on North Korea, which made most large-scale, trilateral infrastructure projects involving Pyongyang impossible to implement.

On August 28, 2018, Vice Defense Minister Suh Choo-suk met with Russian counterpart Alexander Fomin and reached an agreement to install a direct communication line between their air forces of two countries.

In March 2022, Russia placed South Korea on its unfriendly countries list during the 2022 Russian invasion of Ukraine.

In June 2024, as part of a Russian state visit to North Korea, the two countries signed a mutual defense pact. Following this, South Korea stated it would consider supplying Ukraine with military equipment. Putin warned South Korea not to provide military support to Ukraine, or he would make "decisions which are unlikely to please the current leadership of South Korea". On June 22, South Korea summoned Russia's ambassador to protest the mutual defense pact.

South Korea has called in the Russian ambassador to express strong concerns over North Korea allegedly sending troops to support Russia in Ukraine, labeling it a breach of UN resolutions. Reports indicate that North Korean special forces have been trained in Russia, with footage emerging of them receiving military uniforms.

In December 2024, the Financial Times reported that leaked Russian documents outlined plans for Russia to attack South Korea in the event of a wider conflict.

== Diplomatic relations ==
The Soviet Union and South Korea did not have diplomatic relations until September 30, 1990. This relation continued after the breakup of the Soviet Union in 1991, with the Russian Federation being a legal successor to the USSR.

As of 2023, Russia has an embassy in Seoul and consulate general in Busan. South Korea has an embassy in Moscow, and three consulates general: in Saint Petersburg, Irkutsk and Vladivostok.

== Economic cooperation ==
South Korea and Russia are working together on construction of a bilateral industrial complex in the Nakhodka Free Economic Area in Russia's Far East and gas-fields development in Irkutsk. The two sides also agreed to cooperate on reconnecting a planned inter-Korean railroad with the Trans-Siberian Railway. Russia has expressed interest in becoming a conduit for South Korean exports to Europe, which now go by ship, by linking the Korean railroad to the Trans-Siberian Railway.

Russia reportedly offered to repay its $1.7 billion debt to South Korea through joint investments in North Korea, such as the railroad project.

== Space program ==
In 2004, the ROK and Russia signed an agreement on space cooperation. Russia helped Korea create the first stage of the "KSLV" light launch vehicle. South Korea sent its first cosmonaut on board a Soyuz flight to the International Space Station in April 2008. South Korea made domestic satellite launches in 2009 and 2010, both with Russian assistance. The first South Korean satellite was successfully launched in 2013 with extensive Russian assistance and a Russian first stage.

== North Korean nuclear threat ==
After the nuclear test on May 25, 2009 for which North Korea was facing much censure from many countries, Pyongyang has threatened to attack South Korea after it joined a U.S.-led plan to check vessels suspected of carrying equipment for weapons of mass destruction. Many news agencies in Moscow were fearing that this move may lead to nuclear war. North Korea also threatened many other countries such as the US and other federations across the world. A few days later, South Korean President Lee Myung-bak and Russian President Dmitry Medvedev agreed in a phone call that a strong international response was needed, including U.N. action, Lee's office said. Russia said that it will work with Seoul on a new U.N. Security Council resolution and to revive international talks on the North Korean nuclear issue.

== Human migration ==
Koryo-saram is the name, which most ethnic Koreans in the Post-Soviet states use to refer to themselves. These communities can be traced back to the Koreans who were living in the Russian Far East during the late 19th century. Most of them took refuge in Russia after Japanese occupation of Korea in 1910. Most of Koryo-saram were deported to Soviet Central Asia (Uzbekistan and Kazakhstan) in 1937 as part of Stalin's policy of "frontier cleansing".

Currently, there are ca 500,000 Koryo-saram in the former USSR, primarily in Uzbekistan and Kazakhstan. After 1990, a large number of Koryo-saram returned to Russia or to South Korea. Currently, large communities of Koryo-saram live in southern Russia (around Volgograd), the Caucasus, and southern Ukraine.

There is also a separate ethnic Korean community on the island of Sakhalin, typically referred to as Sakhalin Koreans. Some may identify as Koryo-saram, but many do not. Unlike the communities on the Russian mainland, which consist mostly of immigrants from the late 19th and early 20th centuries, the ancestors of the Sakhalin Koreans came as immigrants from Gyeongsang and Jeolla provinces in the late 1930s and early 1940s, forced into service by the Japanese government to work in coal mines in order to fill labour shortages caused by World War II.

Russians in Korea began arriving as early as 1885; however, virtually all of the current Russian community in South Korea, estimated at 10,000 people, is composed of recent migrants.

Since 2014, Korea citizens holding Korea passports can enter Russia without a visa for 60 days, and Korea has also granted visa-free entry for 60 days to Russia citizens holding Russia passports. As a result, the Korea passport is one of the very few passports in developed countries that allows visa-free entry to Russia.

== Cultural exchange ==
There have been cases of cultural exchange between the two countries before the official diplomatic recognition. The introduction of Korean literature to the Russophone area was relatively active until the 1970s mainly through Korean classical stories.

As of 2018, Korean is the third most popular foreign language in Russia. The country has the fourth largest number of university-level Korean language and Korean studies classes and programs.

== See also ==
- Foreign relations of Russia
- Foreign relations of South Korea
