= Ramenki District =

Ramenki District район Раменки (Russian)
- District
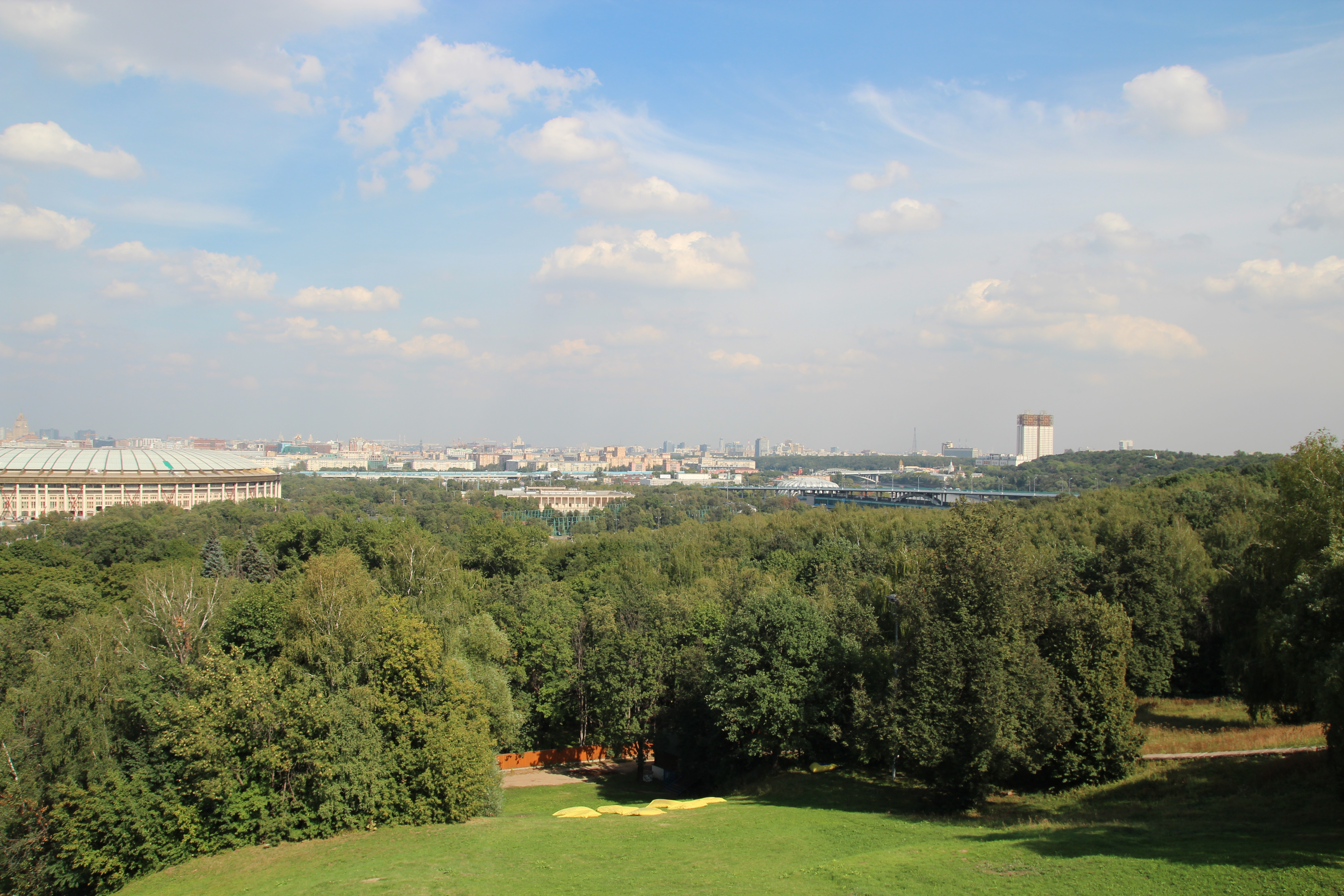
- Park at Moscow State University, Ramenki District

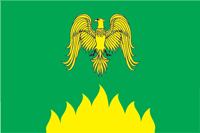
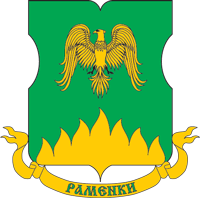
- Flag Coat of arms
- Location of Ramenki District in Moscow
- Coordinates: 55°42′24″N 37°31′00″E
- Country: Russia
- Federal subject: Moscow

Area
  - Total: 18.76 km^{2} (7.24 sq mi)

Population (2010 Census)
  - Total: 125,128
  - Estimate (2017): 126,000
  - Density: 6,670/km^{2} (17,280/sq mi)
  - Urban: 100%
  - Rural: 0%
- Time zone: UTC+
- OKTMO ID: 45325000
- Website: https://ramenki.mos.ru/

Ramenki District (Russian: район Раменки) is a district in the Western Administrative Okrug of the federal city of Moscow, Russia, located approximately in the middle-southwest of the city.

The Ramenki District's border runs along the axis of the Third Ring Road from the north, along the track of the Kiyevsky suburban railway line and along the axis of Lobachevskogo Street from the west, the middle of the 50th Anniversary of October Park from the south, and along Vernadsky Avenue from the east. Ramenki is home to the Moscow State University, 16 embassies, and Mosfilm.

The area of the district is 18.76 square kilometres (7.24 sq mi). Population: 126,000 (2017 est.) 125,128 (2010 census); 101,485 (2002 census).

== History ==
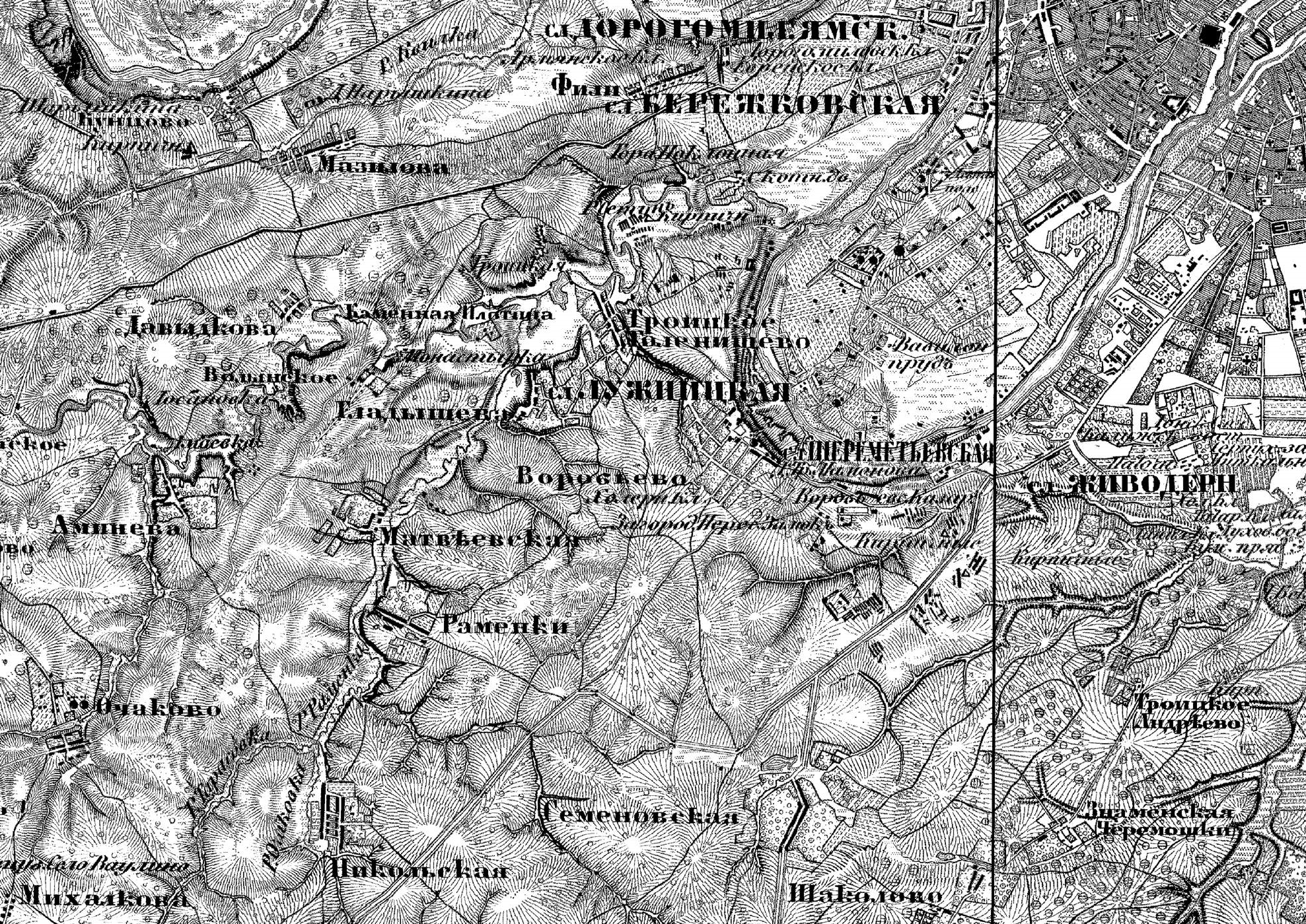
Fragment of a map of Moscow Oblast, 1860

The modern district received its name from the village of the same name, which was located on the district's territory; in turn, the village received its name from the Ramenka River (currently partially enclosed in an underground collector), which is the largest tributary of the Setun. Ramenka is a derivative of "ramenya"; its definition in different sources differs slightly, but usually means a dense forest, a forest adjacent to fields; the following etymologies have also been given:

- the Old East Slavic word "rama", meaning "border adjacent to the forest";
- "ramen'" ("ramenye"), the name of timber for construction and shipbuilding;
- "ramenye", a spruce forest in the European part of the USSR;
- "ramenye", "forest bordering a field". In the Central Russian region, the term is widely represented in the hydronyms of the Oka basin - the name of rivers and streams flowing out of the forest or flowing near it.

The year of the founding of the village of Ramenki is considered to be 1389 (in 1989, the 600th anniversary of the settlement was celebrated in the district). The main street of the village ran in a straight line, located perpendicular to the modern Michurinsky Prospekt and in the place where Ramenki Street currently connects with Michurinsky Prospekt. The village was not large — in 1902, only 441 residents lived there, mostly peasants. After the revolution, collective farms were established on the territory, and later vegetable plots (the remains of which could be seen in the early 1990s and even in the 2000s).

Ramenki was located outside Moscow until the early 1960s, although already in the late 1950s it was located near the border of the city. On the east side of the village there was the old Borovskoye Highway (formerly Borovskaya Road), which went from Vorobyovy Gory through Ramenki and further towards the modern highway of the same name. A significant change in the architectural landscape of this area was brought about by the General Plan for the Reconstruction of Moscow of 1935, according to which, in particular, in the 50-60s, Vernadsky Avenue and Michurinsky Avenue were built (initially, according to the project, they were called "Eastern Ray" and "Western Ray", respectively).

The village of Ramenki was incorporated into Moscow in 1958 and subsequently the village buildings were replaced by city blocks. However, the territory of the district still contains buildings dating back to the 1950s, to the stage when the village began to actively expand and renew itself. In particular, during the construction of the main building of Moscow State University (1940–50s), a university construction town was located near the village of Ramenki. Two-story houses, a canteen, and the Vysotnik Community Center (which still stands today) were built.

There were also several other settlements on the territory of the modern district, but the largest and most famous was the village of Vorobyovo, which was located on a vast hill on the east bank of the Moskva, which received the name Sparrow Hills (Russian: Воробьёвы го́ры, Vorobyovy Gory) after the village. The village of Vorobyovo was first mentioned in surviving documents in the will of 1453 by the widow of the Grand Duke Vasily I of Moscow, Sophia of Lithuania. Sophia bequeathed Vorobyovo and Semyonovskoye to her grandson Yuri Vasilyevich, the Prince of Dmitrov.

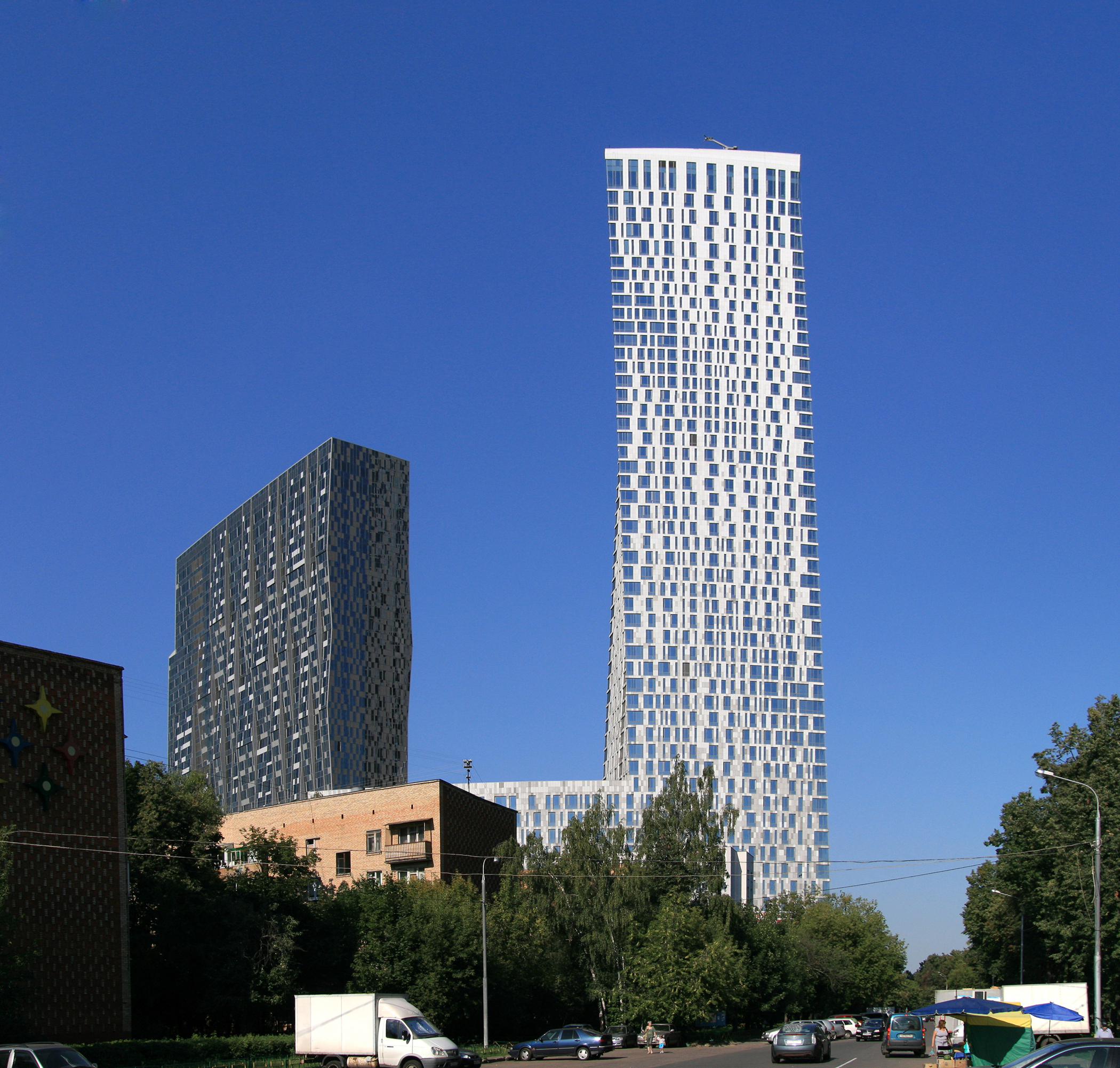
House on Mosfilmovskaya

The municipal districts of Mosfilmovsky and Ramenki were created during the administrative reform of 1991 on part of the territory of the former Gagarinsky District and were part of the Western Administrative Okrug. After the adoption of the law "On the territorial division of the city of Moscow" in 1995, Mosfilmovsky and Ramenki received the status of Moscow districts. However, in 1997, following a proposal by the prefect of the Western Administrative District, the territory of Mosfilmovsky District became part of the Ramenki District. Since 2002, the territory of Russia's largest university, Moscow State University, has also been assigned to Ramenki, as are the All-Russian Academy of Foreign Trade, the All-Russian Research Institute for Civil Defense and Emergencies of the Ministry of Emergency Situations, and the film studio Mosfilm.
