= Bolshaya Ordynka Street =

Thoroughfare in Moscow, Russia

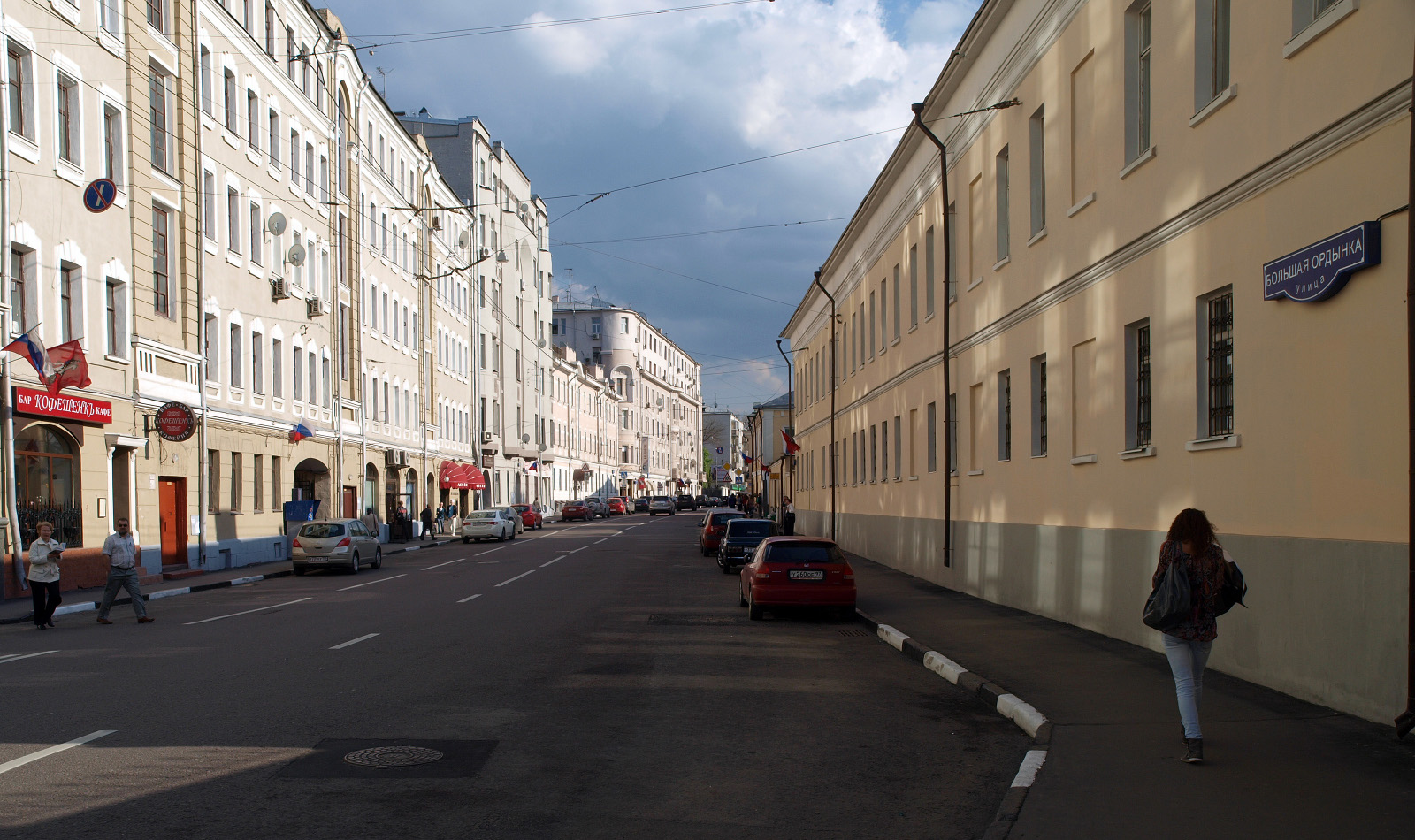
Bolshaya Ordynka in May 2009

Bolshaya Ordynka (Russian: Большая Ордынка) is a historical street in Central Administrative Okrug of Moscow, Russia. A number of landmark buildings, many of which are national heritage sites, are located by the street.

== Etymology ==
While it is agreed that the name of the street is associated with the word orda in reference to the Golden Horde or Mongol Empire, the exact derivation is disputed.
