= Kazakhstan–Russia relations =

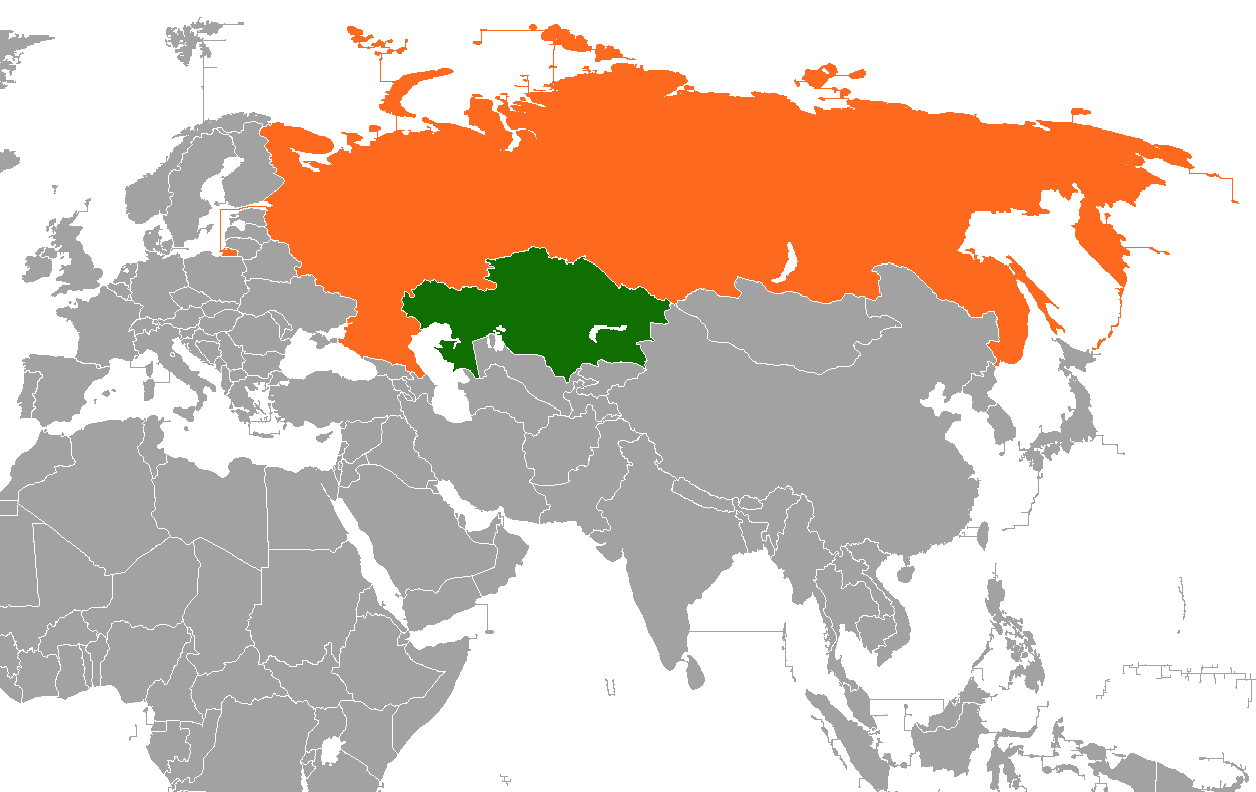

- Kazakhstan: Russia

Diplomatic mission
- Embassy of Kazakhstan, Moscow: Embassy of Russia, Astana

Kazakhstan–Russia relations are the bilateral foreign relations between Kazakhstan and the Russian Federation.

== Overview ==
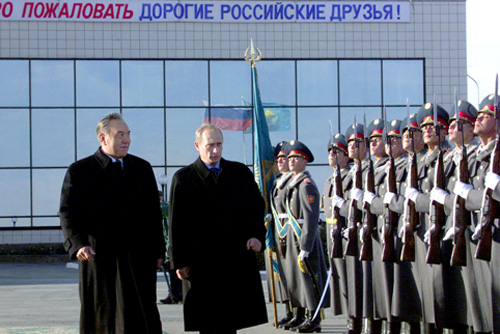
Vladimir Putin in Kazakhstan, October 2000.

The Russian government considers Kazakhstan a reliable ally and strategic partner.

Kazakhstan and Russia are both founding members of the Shanghai Cooperation Organisation, the Collective Security Treaty Organization, and are additionally part of the Euro-Atlantic Partnership Council and the Commonwealth of Independent States. Both also founded the Eurasian Economic Union with Belarus. Following the collapse of the USSR, the issue of nuclear weapons was central to diplomatic relations between Kazakhstan and Russia, the West, and the broader international community.

In recent years, Kazakhstan has attempted to balance ties between both sides by selling petroleum and natural gas to its northern neighbor at artificially low prices, allowing heavy investment from Russian businesses, and concluding an agreement over the Baikonur Cosmodrome, while simultaneously assisting the West in the war on terror.

According to a survey conducted by the Central Asia Barometer between 2017 and 2019, 87% of Kazakhs have a favorable view of Russia, with 8% holding an unfavorable view. The survey also found that 88% support closer relations with Russia, compared to 6% who do not. According to a poll conducted by Demoscope, in November 2022, 22% of respondents expressed support for Ukraine and 13% of respondents expressed support for Russia, down from 39% in March 2022.

In 2023, a poll found that 15% of Kazakhs thought Russia may invade Kazakhstan, up from 8.3% in a previous poll.

== History ==
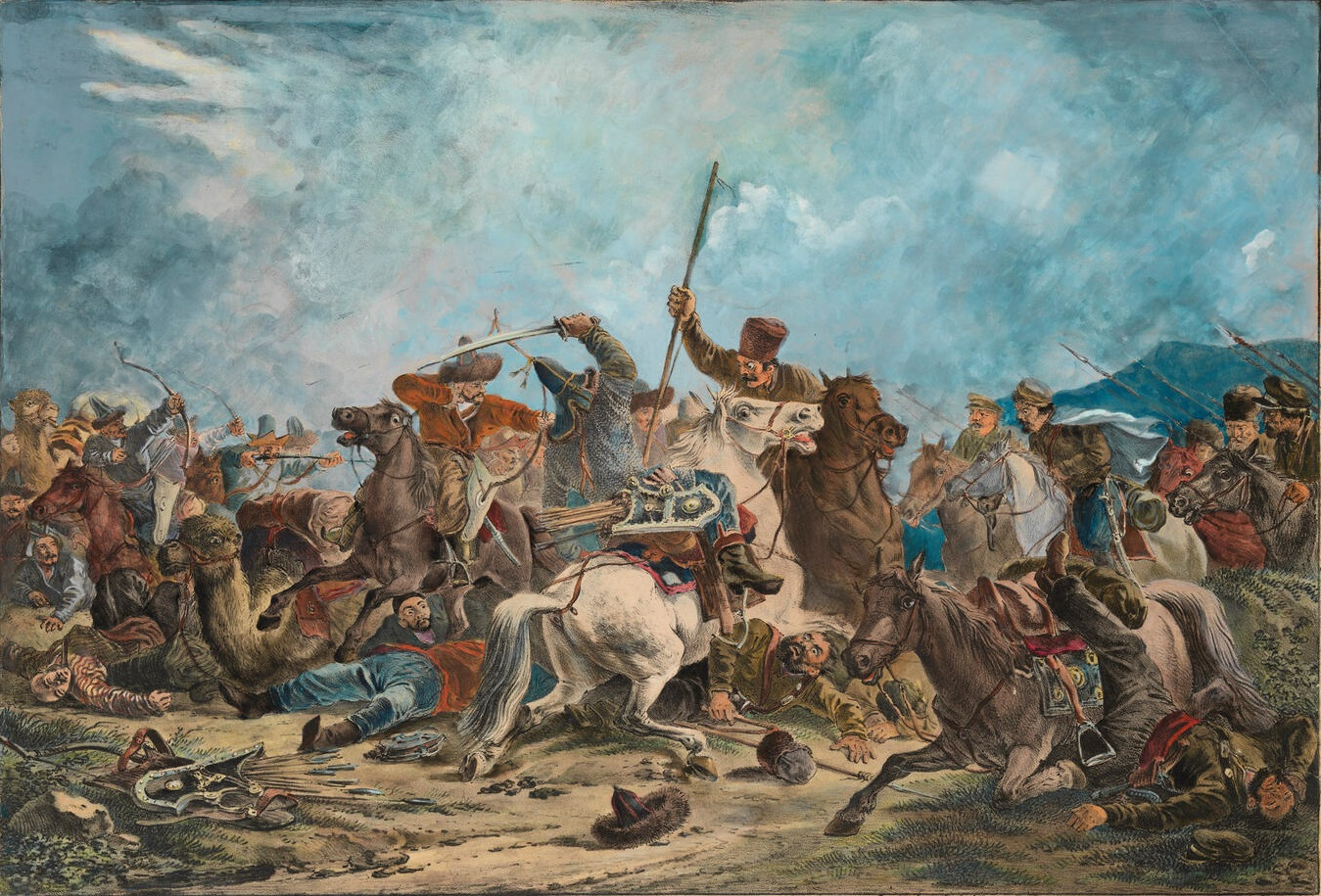
Ural Cossacks skirmish with Kazakhs

During the reign of Kasym Khan from 1511 to 1521, the Tsardom of Russia became the first major state to establish diplomatic relations with the Kazakh Khanate. In the first half of the 18th century, the Russian Empire constructed the Irtysh line, a series of forty-six forts, including Omsk (1716), Semipalatinsk (1718), Pavlodar (1720), Orenburg (1743) and Petropavlovsk (1752), to prevent Kazakh and Dzungar nomads from raiding Russian territory.

With Russian expansion to the south and east, it came under Russian influence and the three hordes of the khanate submitted to the Russians in the 18th century. After the final destruction of the rule of the Kazakh khans, Russian Turkestan was established in 1868, which encompassed most of present-day Kazakhstan. The Russian government settled numerous Russians and Ukrainians in the area, who were allocated land belonging to the indigenous nomadic tribes. A series of uprisings against foreign rule and Russian colonisation were put down by the Tsar.

=== 20th century ===
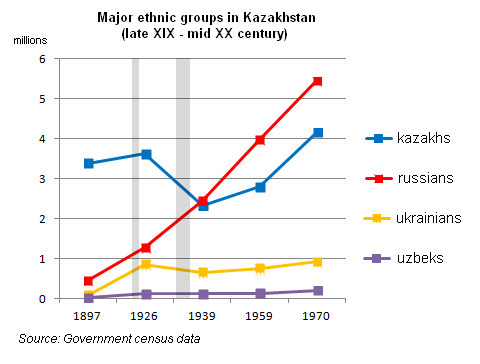
Ethnic groups in Kazakhstan (1897–1970)

In 1906, the Trans-Aral Railway between Orenburg and Tashkent was completed, further facilitating Russian colonisation of the fertile lands of the Zhetysu region. Between 1906 and 1912, many Russian farms were established as part of Russian Interior Minister Pyotr Stolypin's reforms, which put massive pressure on the traditional Kazakh way of life through the utilisation of pastureland and scarce water resources. Out of hunger and because of the expulsions from their land, many Kazakhs joined the Central Asian revolt of 1916 against conscription into the Russian imperial army, which the Tsar ordered in July 1916 as part of the war against the Central Powers in the First World War. At the end of 1916, the Russian armed forces brutally crushed the armed resistance against the seizure of land and the conscription of the Central Asians. Thousands of Kazakhs were killed and many more fled to China and Mongolia. The Russian defeat in the First World War enabled the Kazakhs to establish the autonomous region of Alash Orda from 1917 to 1920, which became a theatre of the Russian Civil War, which the Communists were able to win. The effects of the civil war led to a famine in Kazakhstan, which killed between a fifth and a third of the population.

==== Soviet Kazakhstan ====
Flag of the Kazakh SSR

The Kirghiz Autonomous Socialist Soviet Republic, founded in 1920, was renamed the Kazakh Autonomous Soviet Socialist Republic in 1925, when the Soviet government officially distinguished the Kazakhs from the Kyrgyz. Although the Russian Empire recognised the ethnic difference between the two groups, it called them both "Kyrgyz" to avoid confusion between the terms "Kazakhs" and "Cossacks". At the end of the 1920s, the Soviet dictator Josef Stalin had the Kazakh ruling class executed or deported to gulags. The Soviets launched a programme of forced sedentarisation and expropriation of the nomadic population as part of dekulakisation and deprived the nomads of the livestock they needed to survive. The resulting famine cost around 1.3 to 1.5 million lives between 1929 and 1933. In the 21st century, this catastrophe led to discussions in Kazakhstan as to whether the famine constituted genocide. The famine and the fact that Stalin had numerous groups classified as politically unreliable deported to Kazakhstan (such as the Kazakhstan Germans) changed the demographic composition of the country permanently. The proportion of ethnic Kazakhs fell from 58.5% in 1926 to 37.8% in 1939. Another demographic shock came with the Second World War, when another tenth of the population died.

After the end of the war, nuclear weapons tests were carried out at the Semipalatinsk test site from 1949 onwards. The Kazakh SSR was the second largest union republic within the USSR and had a comparably high level of economic development thanks to its large deposits of raw materials (including oil, coal, natural gas and uranium). Kazakhstan also played an important role in the Soviet space program thanks to the Baikonur Cosmodrome. However, most of the profits from the raw material deposits flowed to other republics of the Union. The Kazakhs remained a minority in Kazakhstan and most of the higher economic and technical positions were held by Russians. When Mikhail Gorbachev came to power in 1985, Kazakh nationalism increased and the Sheltoksan protests broke out in 1986. In March 1991, 95% of the population voted in the 1991 Soviet Union referendum in favour of the Kazakh SSR remaining part of the USSR and the adoption of a new union constitution, which would have granted autonomy to the Soviet republics. After the failed August coup in Moscow, the Soviet Union collapsed and the Kazakh SSR was the last union republic to declare its independence in December 1991.

When the USSR dissolved in 1991, it left a Soviet biological weapons program and a Soviet nuclear weapons program, Semipalatinsk Test Site, in Russia, Kazakhstan, Uzbekistan, Georgia, Azerbaijan, and Ukraine. Seeing a large peace dividend, the Bush administration passed such legislation as the Soviet Nuclear Threat Reduction Act of 1991 and over the next 15 years spent more than $400 million on the Nunn–Lugar Cooperative Threat Reduction and Biological Threat Reduction program, of which the Stepnogorsk Scientific and Technical Institute for Microbiology was a large recipient.

===== Aftereffects =====
Following the dissolution of the Soviet Union, the legacy of Soviet-era space activity in Kazakhstan had long-lasting implications for Kazakh-Russian relations. A notable example was the 1972 launch of the Venus-bound Soviet space probe Cosmos 482 from the Baikonur Cosmodrome, located in what was then the Kazakh Soviet Socialist Republic. Due to a malfunction, the probe failed to escape Earth orbit and remained in a decaying elliptical trajectory for over five decades. In May 2025 it was expected to re-enter Earth's atmosphere, with some components potentially surviving reentry due to its durable titanium shell designed for the harsh conditions of Venus.

=== Since 2000 ===
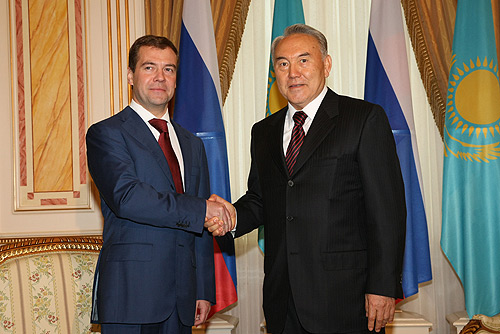
Kazakhstani President Nursultan Nazarbayev with Russian President Dmitry Medvedev

In January 2005 President of Russia Vladimir Putin and Kazakh President Nursultan Nazarbayev signed an agreement approving an official map of the border. On 23 May 2009, the two countries placed their first boundary marker on the 7,591 km (4,717 mi) border between Kazakhstan's Atyrau and Russia's Astrakhan provinces. The demarcation is expected to take 10 to 15 years to complete.

==== Putin's 2013 comments on Kazakh statehood ====
In 2013, President Vladimir Putin raised controversy when he claimed that "Kazakhs had never had statehood", in what seemed to be an apparent response to growing nationalism among Kazakhstanis. Putin's remarks on the matter led to a severe response from President Nazarbayev, who announced that the country would celebrate the 550th anniversary of the Kazakh Khanate, which effectively refutes Putin's claim that a Kazakh nation has never existed. He also threatened to withdraw from the Eurasian Economic Union, saying that the independence of the country is his "most precious treasure" and that Kazakhs "will never surrender" their independence.

In December 2020, Putin's derogatory comments were repeated by at least two Russian lawmakers.

==== 2022 anti-government protests ====
At the request of Tokayev government, Russia participated in the CSTO Peacekeeping Force effort to quell the anti-government protests on 6 January 2022. The Russian forces included units of the Airborne Troops and the air transport of the Russian Aerospace Forces. On 13 January the CSTO forces began to withdraw. On 19 January the withdrawal was complete. There are roughly 1,000 Russian troops in Kazakhstan according to Ukraine's Main Directorate of Intelligence of Ukraine's Ministry of Defense.

==== 2022 Russian invasion of Ukraine ====
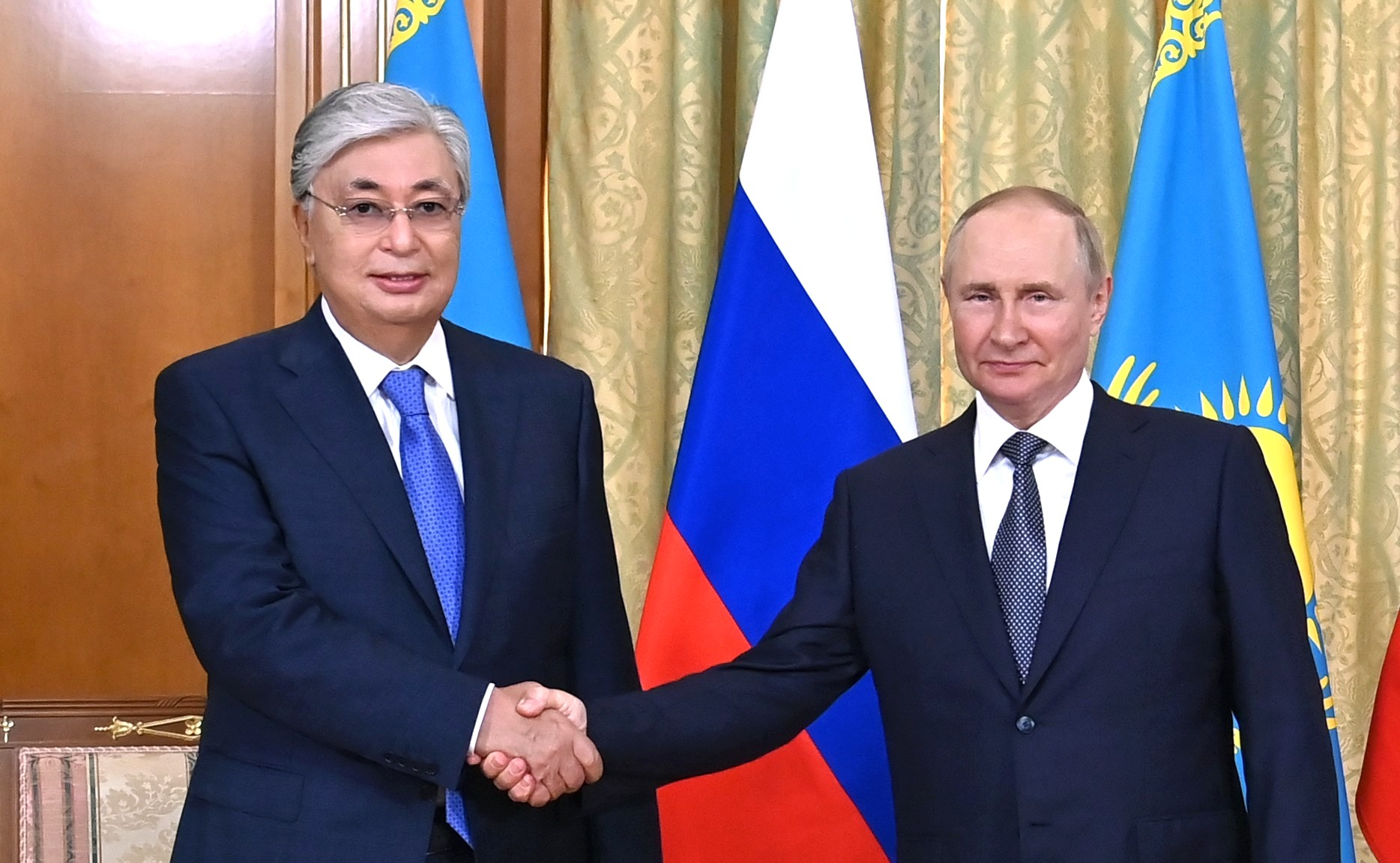
Kazakhstani President Kassym-Jomart Tokayev and Russian President Vladimir Putin on 19 August 2022

Kazakhstan–Russia relations deteriorated greatly upon the Russian invasion of Ukraine. Kazakh leadership including Kazakh Foreign Minister Mukhtar Tleuberdi did not condemn the Russian invasion and abstained on the UN vote to condemn it, but at the same time they refused to recognize the Russian states of Donetsk People's Republic and Luhansk People's Republic.

In addition to sending humanitarian aid to Ukraine, the Kazakh military increased spending and training. Although Russia never showed any particular interest for Northern Kazakhstan, a region with a sizeable Russian minority, there is still the fear the same arguments used in Ukraine can be used to bolster Russian irredentism in the North.

Russia suspended shipments of Kazakh oil after Tokayev's statements at the St. Petersburg International Economic Forum, where he stated that Kazakhstan considered the DPR and LPR as "quasi-state entities" and would not recognize them. On the other hand, in spite of some tensions, Kazakhstan's relations with Russia remain strong and mostly friendly, as shown by Tokayev's visit to Moscow in November 2022.

Following the 2022 Russian mobilization, Kazakhstan received a large influx of Russians leaving to avoid being conscripted to fight in Ukraine. President Tokayev promised that his government would help Russians who were leaving "because of the current hopeless situation", and that it was "a political and a humanitarian issue."

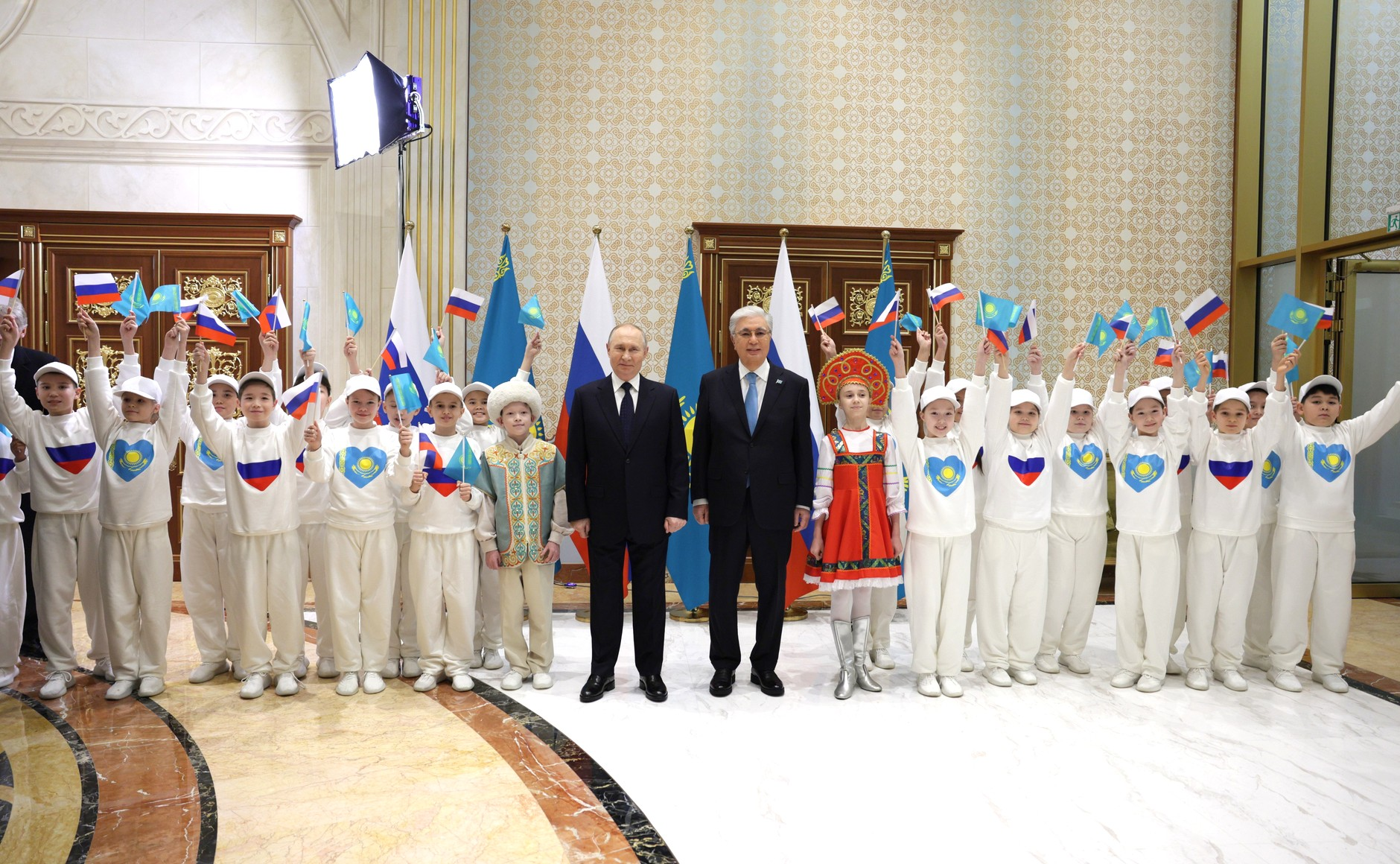
Vladimir Putin and Kassym-Jomart Tokayev during Putin's state visit to Kazakhstan on 27 November 2024

In 2022, Kazakhstan agreed to share the personal data of exiled anti-war Russians with the Russian government. In September 2022, Kazakh authorities detained a Russian journalist who was wanted on charges of "discrediting" the Russian military. In December 2022, Kazakhstan deported a Russian citizen who fled mobilization. In January 2023, Kazakhstan announced they were tightening visa rules, a move that is expected to make it more difficult for Russians to remain in the country.

In September 2023, Kazakhstani President Kassym-Jomart Tokayev stated that Kazakhstan would follow the sanctions regime against Russia.

In January 2024, the head of the Kazakh diaspora in Moscow, Polat Dzhamalov, was charged by Russian authorities with spreading "false information" about the Russian armed forces after he shared a senior Russian official's alleged estimate of Russian military deaths in a Facebook post.

On 25 July 2026, during a meeting with Putin in Omsk, Tokayev called for the Russo-Ukrainian war to be frozen and for negotiations to resume on the basis of what he described as the “Istanbul Formula 2.0”. He said that, under security guarantees from major powers, including Russia, the two sides could move towards a lasting peace. Tokayev described the war as an interstate conflict and said that its nature was “not fully understood by many, including ourselves”. He also expressed concern over the continued loss of life, saying that “young people are dying” and that the fighting should be brought to an end. Tokayev ruled out Kazakhstan acting as a mediator, while reaffirming the country's strategic partnership and allied relations with Russia.

==== Post-Soviet commemorative diplomacy ====
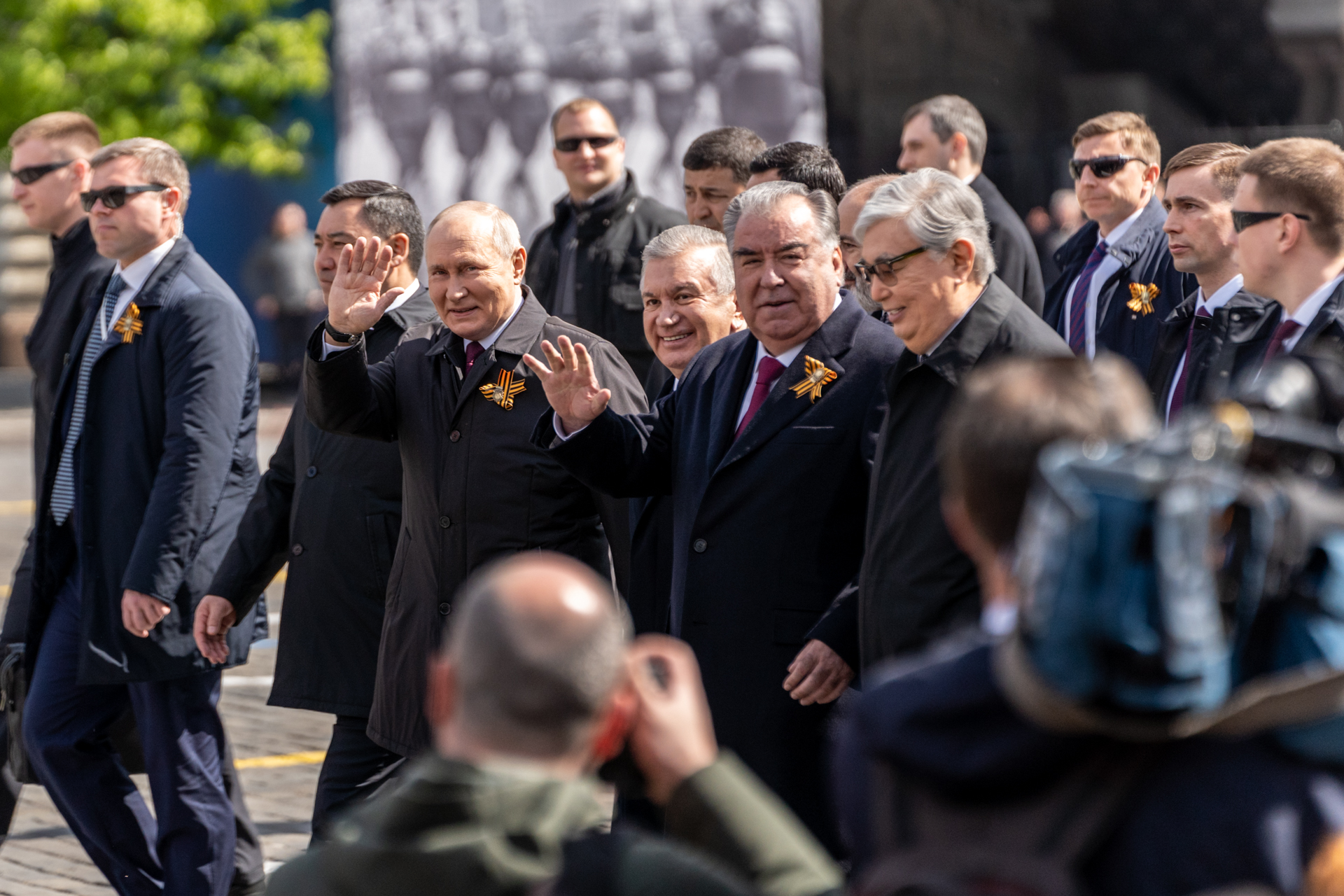
Putin, Tokayev and other post-Soviet leaders from Central Asia at the 2023 Moscow Victory Day Parade

Commemorative diplomacy has remained a key feature of Kazakh-Russian relations in the post-Soviet era, particularly surrounding shared memories of World War II. Since the early 2000s, Kazakhstan and other Central Asian nations have regularly participated in Moscow's annual Victory Day parade, marking the defeat of Nazi Germany. 9 May 2025, Kazakhstan's President joined other leaders of the Commonwealth of Independent States (CIS) in Moscow to mark the 80th anniversary of the Allied victory, reaffirming regional solidarity rooted in Soviet history.

While such attendance is traditional, it has gained increased international attention in recent years, as Russia has used the event to emphasize diplomatic ties amid growing Western isolation following its actions in Ukraine. Despite this, Central Asian nations, including Kazakhstan, maintain their own commemorations. In 2025, Kazakhstan conducted a military parade in Astana on 7 May, continuing a pattern of national observance that complements, rather than replaces, regional participation in Moscow.

== Economic relations ==
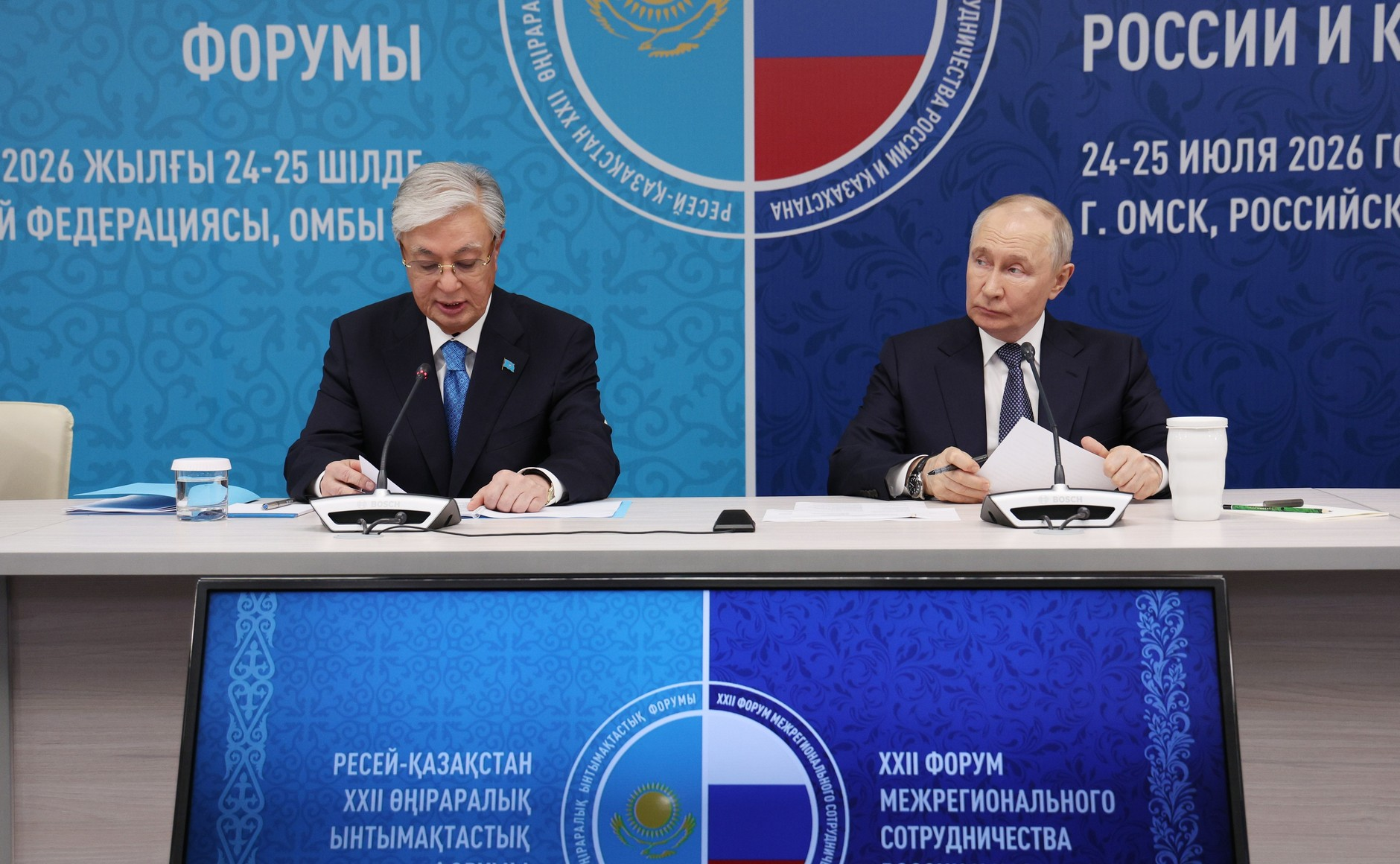
Kazakh President Kassym-Jomart Tokayev and Russian President Vladimir Putin at the 22nd Russia–Kazakhstan Interregional Cooperation Forum in Omsk, 25 July 2026

Overall money flow in trade between Kazakhstan–Russia in 2018 was $18,219,255,476, which is more than 2017's numbers by 5.68%. Export to Kazakhstan was: $12,923,333,532 which is more than 2017's numbers by 4.86%. Export to Russia was: $5,295,921,944 which is more than 2017's numbers by 7.71%.

The main products of trade are machinery, mineral products, metal, chemicals, agricultural supplies, and shoes. The influx of Russian direct investment in the Republic of Kazakhstan for the period 2005–2014. amounted to 9.1 billion US dollars, and Kazakhstan in Russia – 2.9 billion US dollars.

On a 27-29 May 2026 Vladimir Putin's state visit to Kazakhstan, the two countries signed 15 documents including a currency swap agreement, a deal for the construction of two units of Kazakhstan's first nuclear power plant which is financed by a Russian state credit, and a joint statement on friendship and good neighborly relations. Bilateral trade reached a record $29 bln in 2025 and Russia's total investment in Kazakhstan's economy exceeded $29.4 bln by the end of that year.

One of the most active and large-scale relations is in the fuel sphere. The transit of Kazakh oil through Russia is also carried out within the framework of the Caspian Pipeline Consortium (CPC). At 50 percent, CPC is owned by the governments of Russia and Kazakhstan, and by 50 percent – by mining companies that financed the commissioning of the first phase of the project.

Big Russian companies like Lukoil ($5 billion), Gazprom ($1 billion), INTER RAO UES ($0.2 billion) Rusal ($0.4 billion), Rosatom State Corporation, Rosneft OJSC, Bank VTB OJSC, VEB, Mechel OJSC, Severstal OJSC invest in Kazakhstan's economy.

=== Ongoing trade dispute ===
In July 2024, Kazakhstan banned wheat imports from Russia through the end of the year in order to "protect the domestic market". In October 2024, Russia began to restrict food imports from Kazakhstan, with the Russian government agency Rosselkhoznadzor citing the need to "preserve the phytosanitary well-being of Russia". Russia's ban was implemented five days after Kazakhstan said it didn't have plans to join BRICS in the near future, but it is unclear if these two events are related.

In March 2025, Russia expressed dissatisfaction with Kazakhstan's commercial banks, accusing them of excessive caution in processing payments and extending loans to Russian businesses. The concern stemmed from Kazakh banks demanding "letters of guarantee" and imposing stringent due diligence, fearing secondary sanctions and disconnection from the SWIFT system. The Kazakh National Bank, under Timur Suleimenov, refused to pressure banks to ease these rules, citing legitimate concerns over potential sanctions. This caution followed accusations in 2023 that Kazakhstan had served as a conduit for Russia's war efforts, despite Kazakhstan's official adherence to US and EU sanctions.

=== Caspian Sea ===
In April 2025, the Caspian Pipeline Consortium (CPC), a key oil export route from Kazakhstan via Russia's Black Sea port of Novorossiysk, resumed partial operations after Russian authorities lifted restrictions tied to a December 2024 oil spill. The CPC, which handles about 80% of Kazakhstan's oil exports and includes Western shareholders like Chevron and ExxonMobil, restored activity at two of its three moorings. Although operations remain strained due to the continued closure of the third mooring (SPM-2), the move helped avert a sharp drop in Kazakh exports. The disruption had followed regional instability, including drone attacks on infrastructure in southern Russia, and came amid tensions within OPEC+ over Kazakhstan exceeding its production quotas, largely due to output from the Tengiz field.

== Military cooperation ==
According to the agreement on military cooperation (signed on 16 October 2020 during the visit of the Minister of Defense of the Russian Federation Sergey Shoigu to Kazakhstan), Kazakhstan and Russia carry out military cooperation in the following main areas:

- joint planning of the use of troops (forces) in the interests of ensuring the security of the parties in the event of the appeal of one of the parties;
- joint counteraction to challenges and threats to regional security in the event of the appeal of one of the parties;
- operational and combat training;
- Military education and science;
- peacekeeping activities;
- activities of troops (forces) and their comprehensive support;
- improvement of the bilateral regulatory framework;
- interaction within the participation of military delegations of the parties in the work of international organizations;
- culture and sport;
- other areas of military cooperation in coordination of the parties.

As a result of the protests of the population and mass riots on the evening of 5 January 2022, the President of Kazakhstan appealed to the leaders of the CSTO with a request to provide with a peacekeeping support. The Russian group of CSTO troops guarded vital facilities.

On 3 March 2023, Russia transferred to Kazakhstan the 11F647M "Ekran-M" spacecraft, the assembly and protective unit, and three systems, one of which is designed to test objects, as well as composite materials, spare parts, tools and components.

== Cultural relations ==
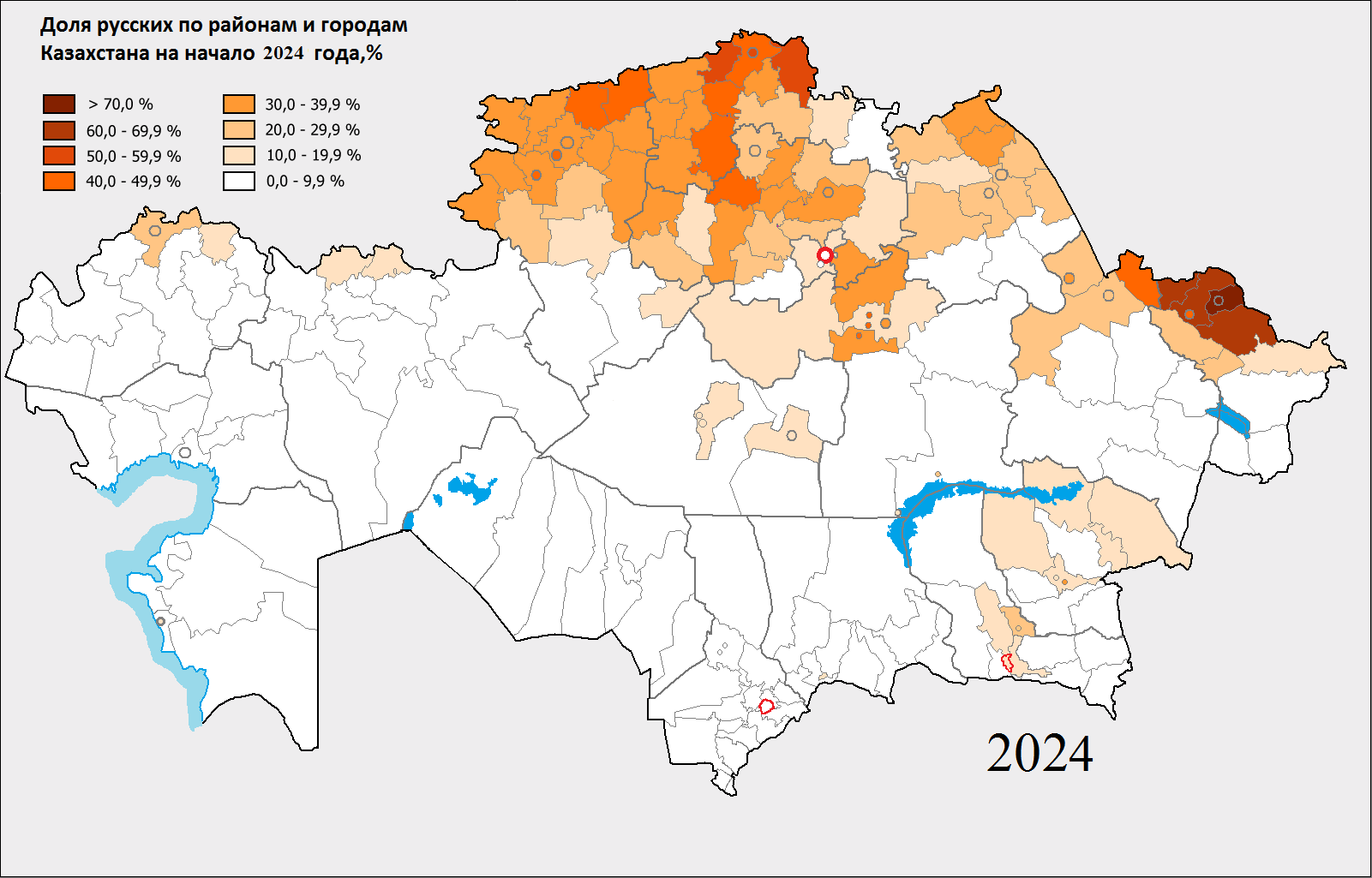
Share of ethnic Russians in Kazakhstan (2021)

Almost 3.4 million ethnic Russians lived in Kazakhstan in 2023, making Russians just under 18% of the population. However, the proportion of Russians in Kazakhstan is declining significantly due to lower birth rates and emigration to Russia; in 1970 Russians constituted 42% of the population. Russian is still widely spoken as a lingua franca in Kazakhstan. After independence from the Soviet Union, the Kazakh government pursued a policy of developing Kazakh as the state language in order to emphasise the Kazakh character of the country and promote the Kazakh language and culture. One aspect of this policy was the government's decision to define Kazakhstan as a Kazakh nation-state in the country's first constitution in 1993 and the second constitution in 1995. This indigenization policy, combined with a lack of economic prospects, fuelled the decline of the Russian population in the country, as many ethnic Russians decided to emigrate. Russians continue to form the majority of the population in northern Kazakhstan. Kazakh has been written in the Cyrillic alphabet since Russian rule, before the introduction of the Latin alphabet was announced in 2021, which is due to be completed by 2031.

Both countries have concluded numerous cultural, technical and scientific agreements. Cooperation in education and research is very intensive. Almost 60,000 Kazakhs study in Russia and Russia supports Kazakh students abroad with scholarships. Kazakhstan and Russia also jointly manage the spaceport in Baikonur.

In March 2023, Kazakhstan canceled a music festival where pro-Kremlin Russian singers, including Grigory Leps, were scheduled to perform. In June 2023, Leps' concert in the Almaty Region was canceled following pressure from the Kazakh public and activists over his support for the Russian invasion of Ukraine.

In June 2023, a Kazakh official warned that Russian-owned Telegram enabled easy drug purchases for minors.

In January 2024, pro-Kremlin television presenter Tina Kandelaki was banned from entering Kazakhstan over her online comments alleging that the Russian language was being discriminated against in the Central Asian country.

== Resident diplomatic missions ==
Diplomatic missions of Kazakhstan in Russia

- Moscow (Embassy)
- Astrakhan (Consulate-General)
- Kazan (Consulate-General)
- Omsk (Consulate-General)
- Saint Petersburg (Consulate-General)
- Yekaterinburg (Consulate-General)

Diplomatic missions of Russia in Kazakhstan

- Astana (Embassy)
- Almaty (Consulate-General)
- Oral (Consulate-General)
- Oskemen (Consulate-General)

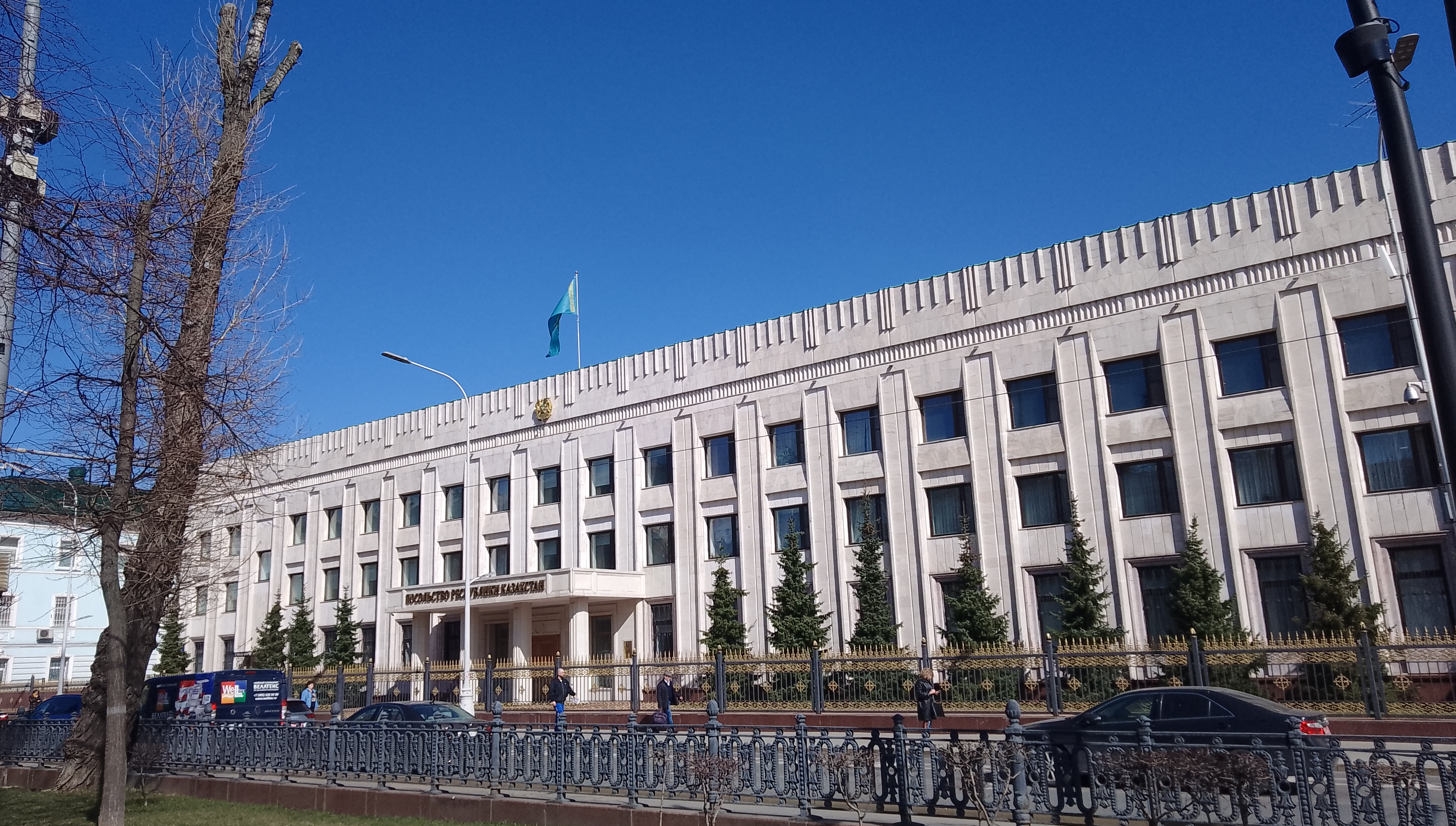
Embassy of Kazakhstan in Moscow

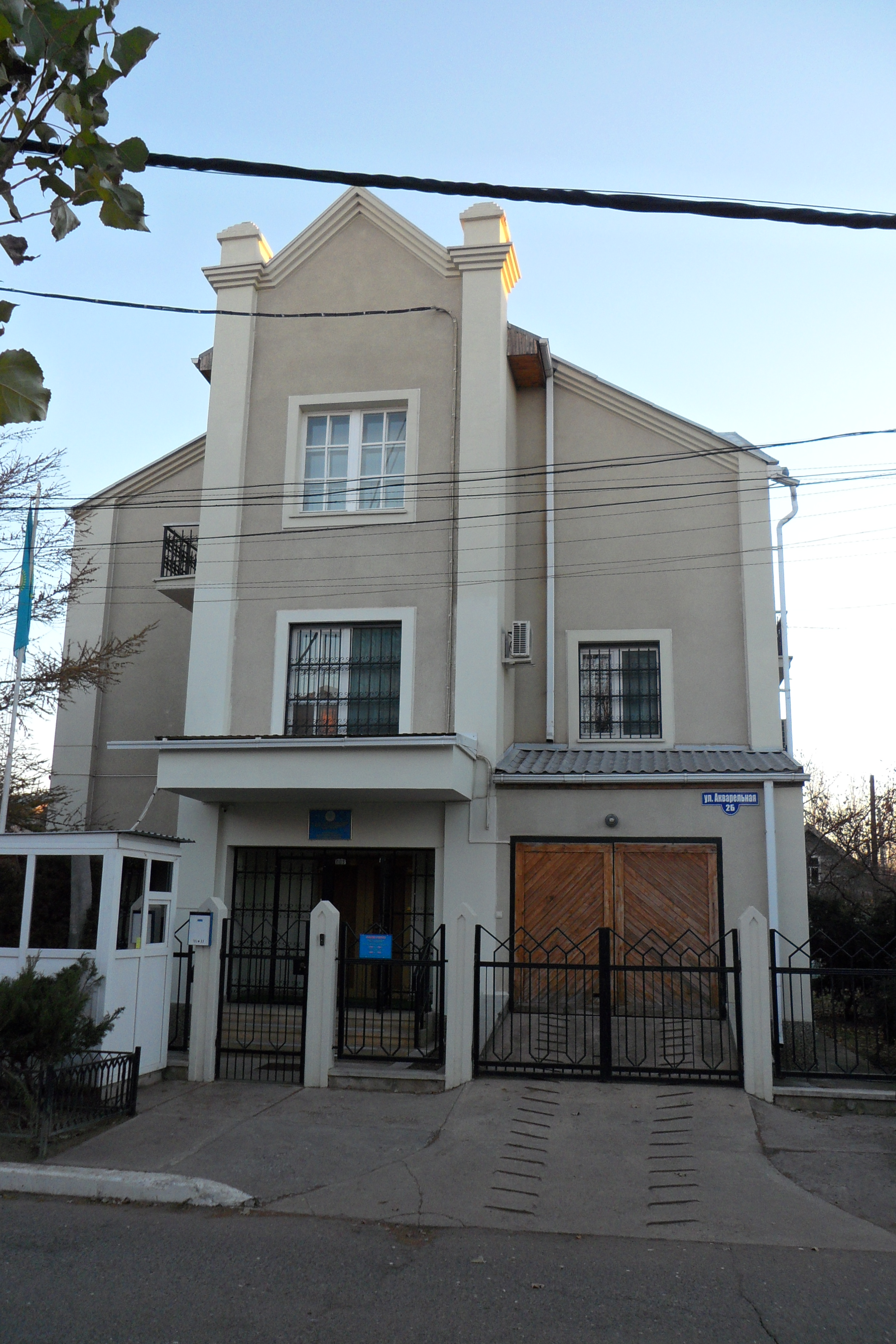
Consulate-General of Kazakhstan in Astrakhan

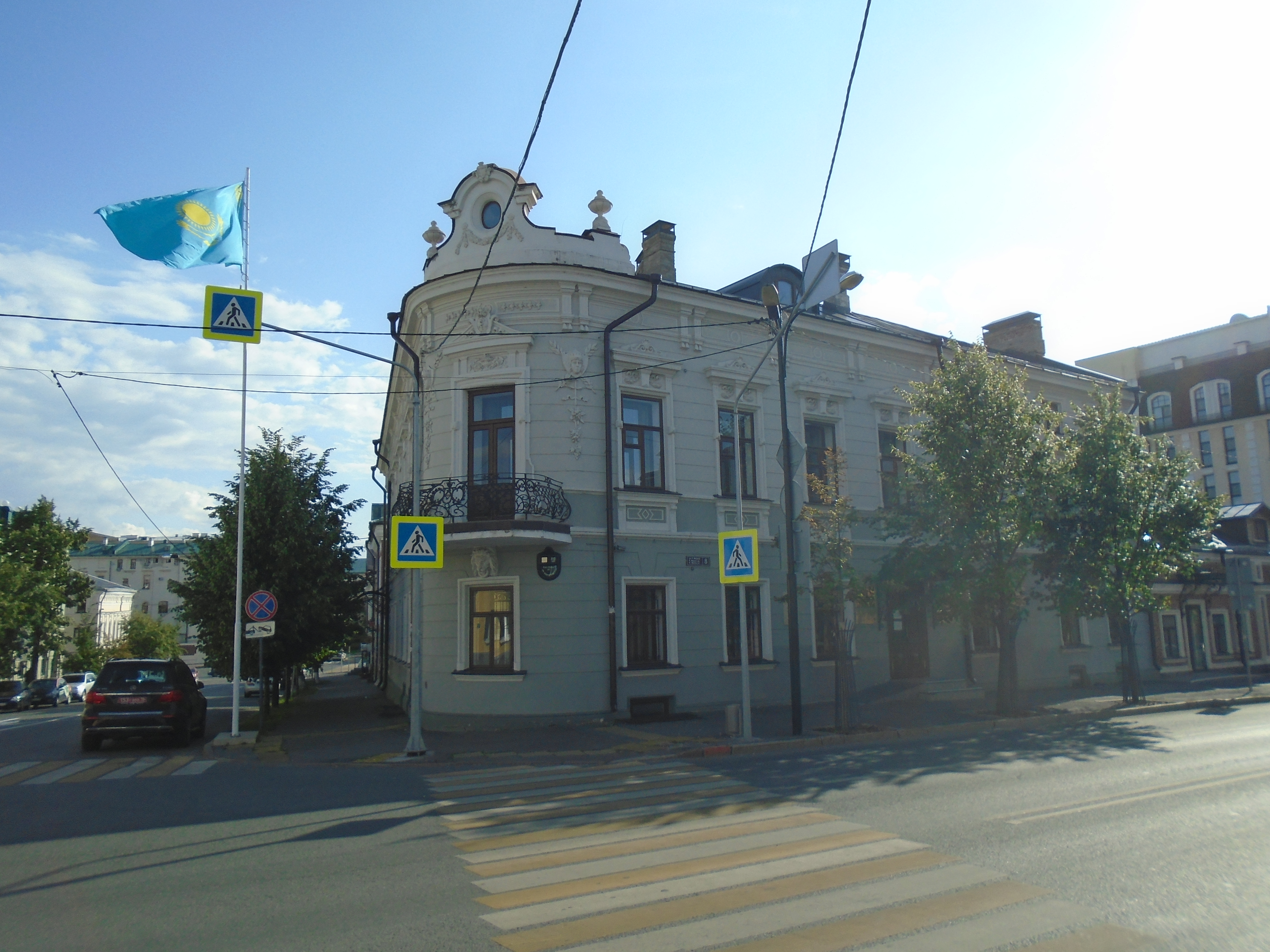
Consulate-General of Kazakhstan in Kazan

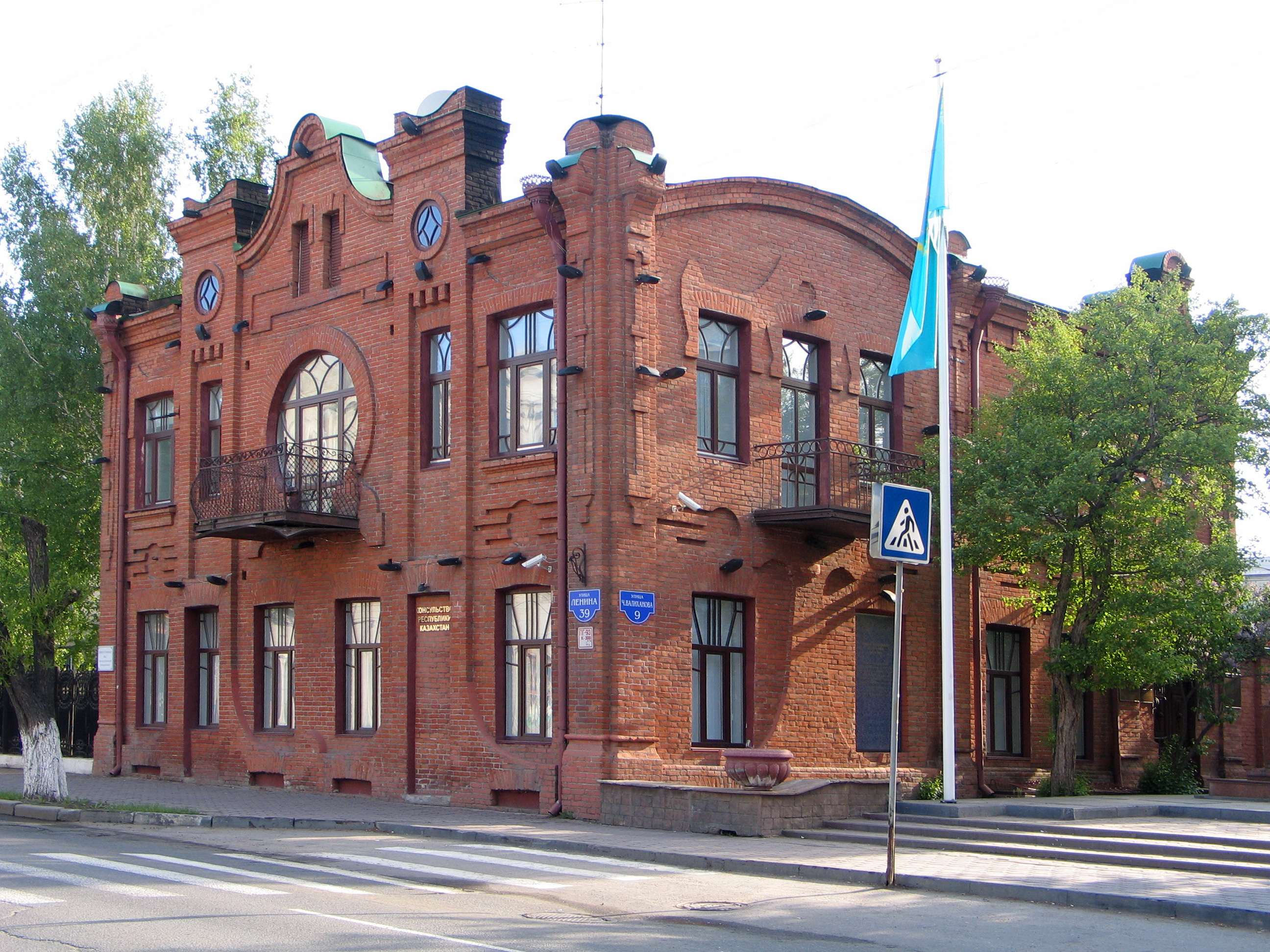
Consulate-General of Kazakhstan in Omsk

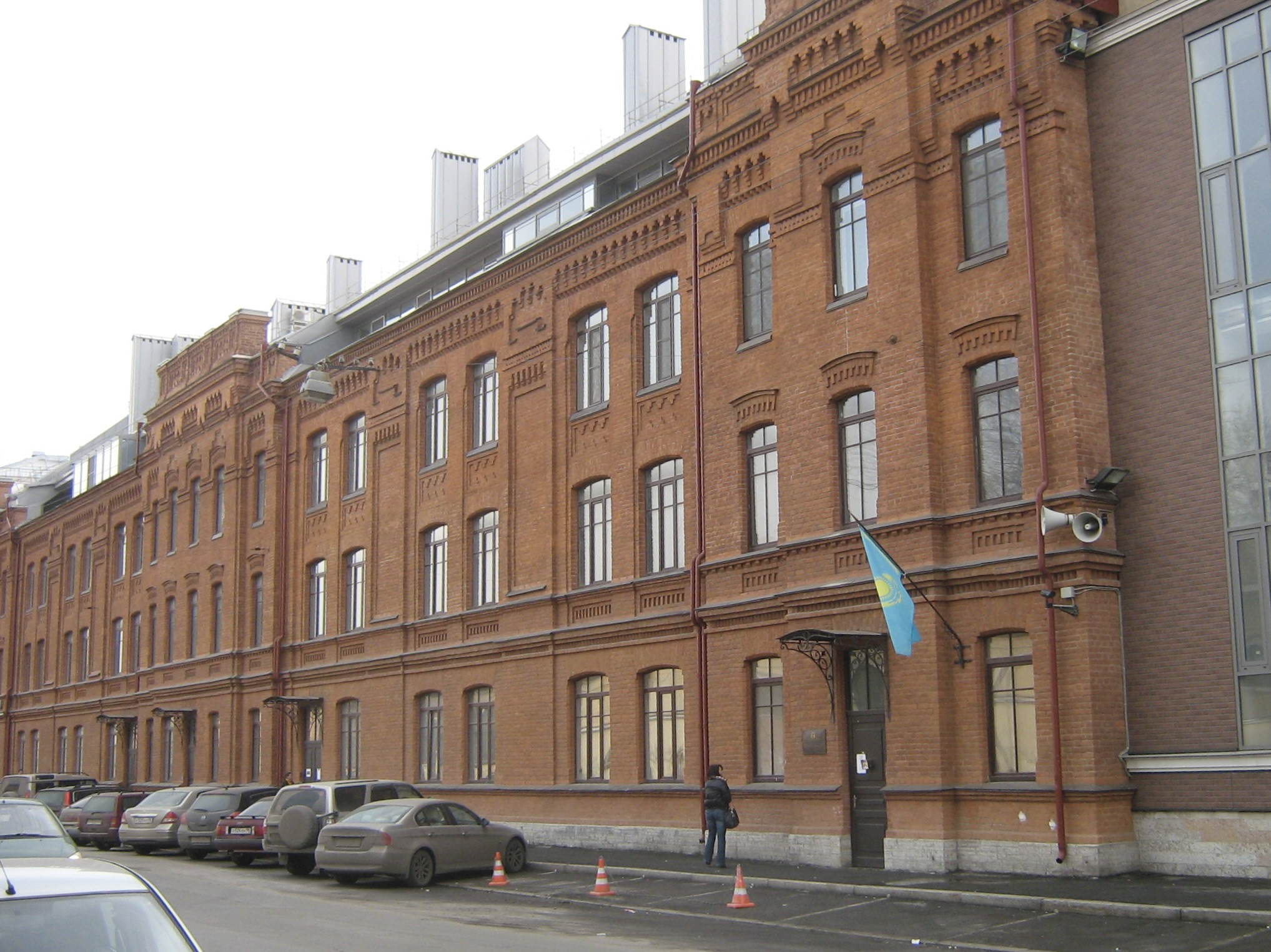
Consulate-General of Kazakhstan in Saint Petersburg
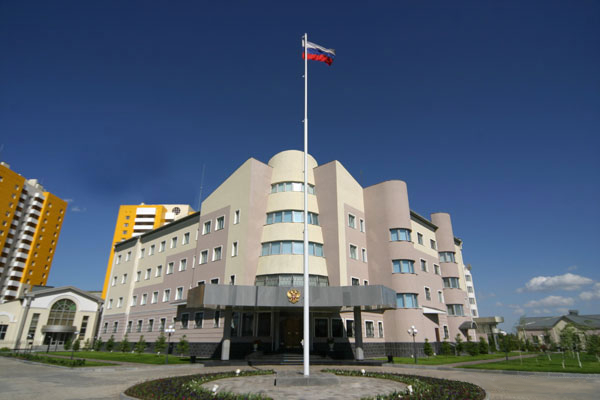
Embassy of Russia in Astana

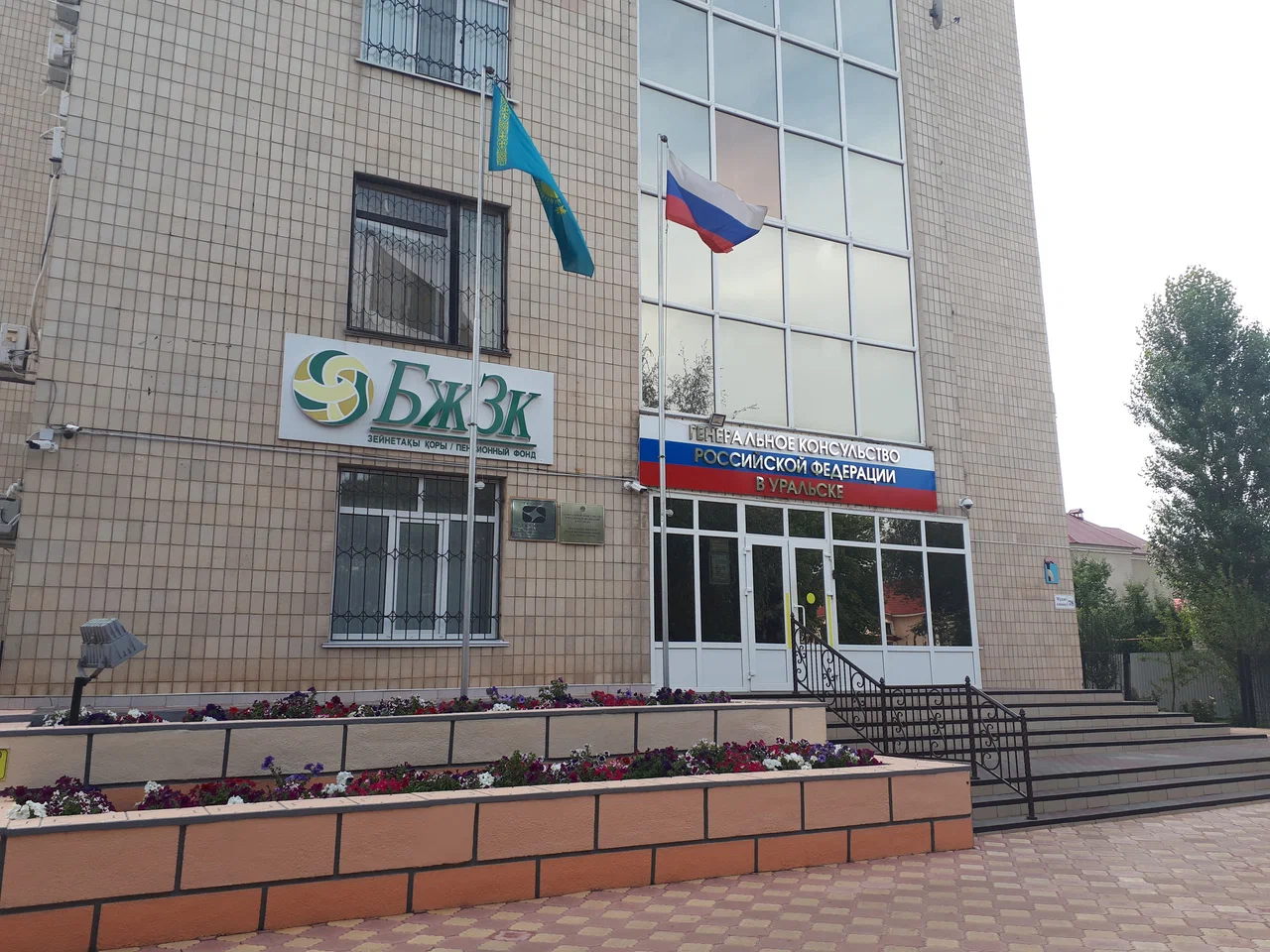
Consulate-General of Russia in Oral

== See also ==
- Foreign relations of Kazakhstan
- Foreign relations of Russia
- Kazakhs in Russia
- Russians in Kazakhstan
- Petroleum politics
- Kazakhstan–Russia border
- List of ambassadors of Russia to Kazakhstan
