= Russian emigration =

Russian emigration may refer to:

- White émigrés : Russians who emigrated from the territory of the former Russian Empire in the wake of the Russian Revolution (1917) and Russian Civil War (1917–1923).
- Russian emigration following the 2022 invasion of Ukraine
