= Filipp Kozlov =

- Филипп Козлов
- Born: 25 December 1984; Volgograd, Soviet Union
- Education: Volgograd State Technical University
- Occupation: Artist
- Known for: Art dealing with social issues

Filipp Kozlov (Russian: Филипп Козлов; known as Philippenzo; born December 25, 1984, Volgograd, USSR) is a contemporary Russian artist. He works in the field of street art and is known for works addressing pressing social issues.

== Biography ==
Filipp Kozlov was born in Volgograd on December 25, 1984. From 1991 to 2002, he attended Volgograd Gymnasium No. 4. Later, Kozlov pursued his education at Volgograd State Technical University and the British Higher School of Art and Design.

Initially, Philippenzo appended the term "Madonnaro" to his pseudonym—derived from madonnari, the medieval Italian pavement artists. The work of the madonnari inspired Philippenzo to begin his career as a street artist by creating 3D paintings on asphalt. He also created "puddle art" in various cities around the world—images formed from puddles that would vanish as the water evaporated. In addition to street art, Philippenzo creates pixel-style canvases using a signature "high-dripping" technique. Pixel art elements also appear in his street works. In an interview with the BBC, Philippenzo explained that works such as Lake and Kisses were significantly influenced by the "Monstration" art movement.

In 2021, Philippenzo participated in a campaign to support the media outlet Meduza. His work was featured in an NFT collection, with all proceeds intended to be transferred to the publication in cryptocurrency.

On July 29, 2023, upon returning to Moscow from Georgia, Philippenzo was detained at the airport, where a police report was filed against him for disobeying police orders. A Moscow court sentenced the artist to 15 days of administrative arrest. According to Philippenzo, he was brought to court on August 10, and the hearing took place without his lawyer present. On August 11, the Lyubertsy municipal court in Moscow Oblast sentenced Philippenzo to another 15 days of arrest on charges of disobeying police orders. On October 13, 2023, Philippenzo was forced to emigrate to Lithuania due to a criminal case involving charges of vandalism motivated by political hatred. Subsequently, on October 25 of that same year, it was revealed that the Ministry of Internal Affairs had placed the artist on the wanted list.
