= Embassy of Kazakhstan, Moscow =

Embassy

Coordinates: 55.7641°N 37.6422°E

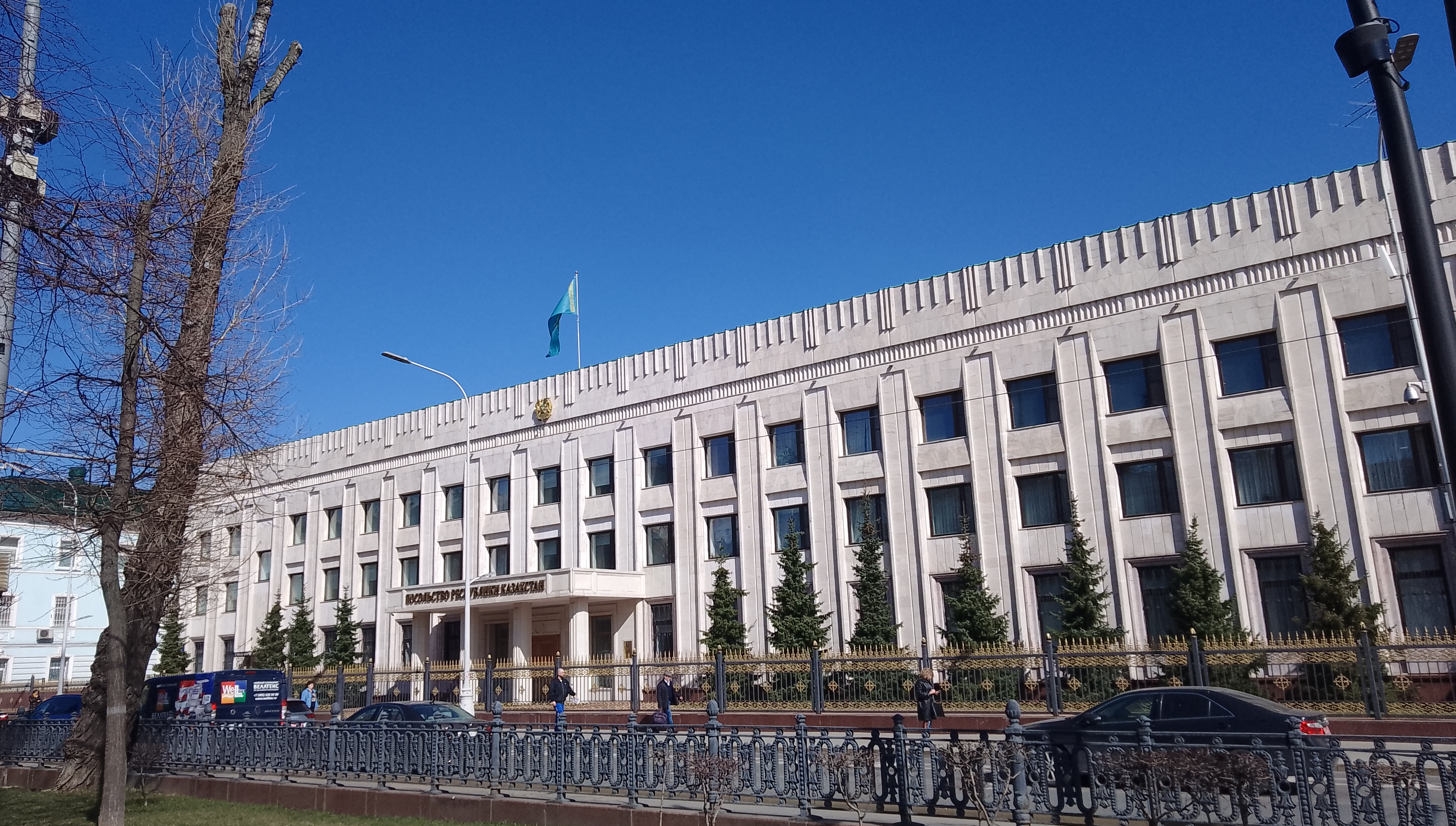
Kazakh embassy in Moscow

The Embassy of the Republic of Kazakhstan in Moscow (Russian: Посольство Республики Казахстан в Российской Федерации) is the chief diplomatic mission of Kazakhstan in the Russian Federation. It is located at 3a Chistoprudny Boulevard (Russian: Чистопрудный бульвар, 3а) in the Basmanny District of Moscow.

The ambassador is Galym Orazbakov.

== See also ==
- Kazakhstan–Russia relations
- Diplomatic missions in Russia
