= Pornofilmy =

Russian punk rock band

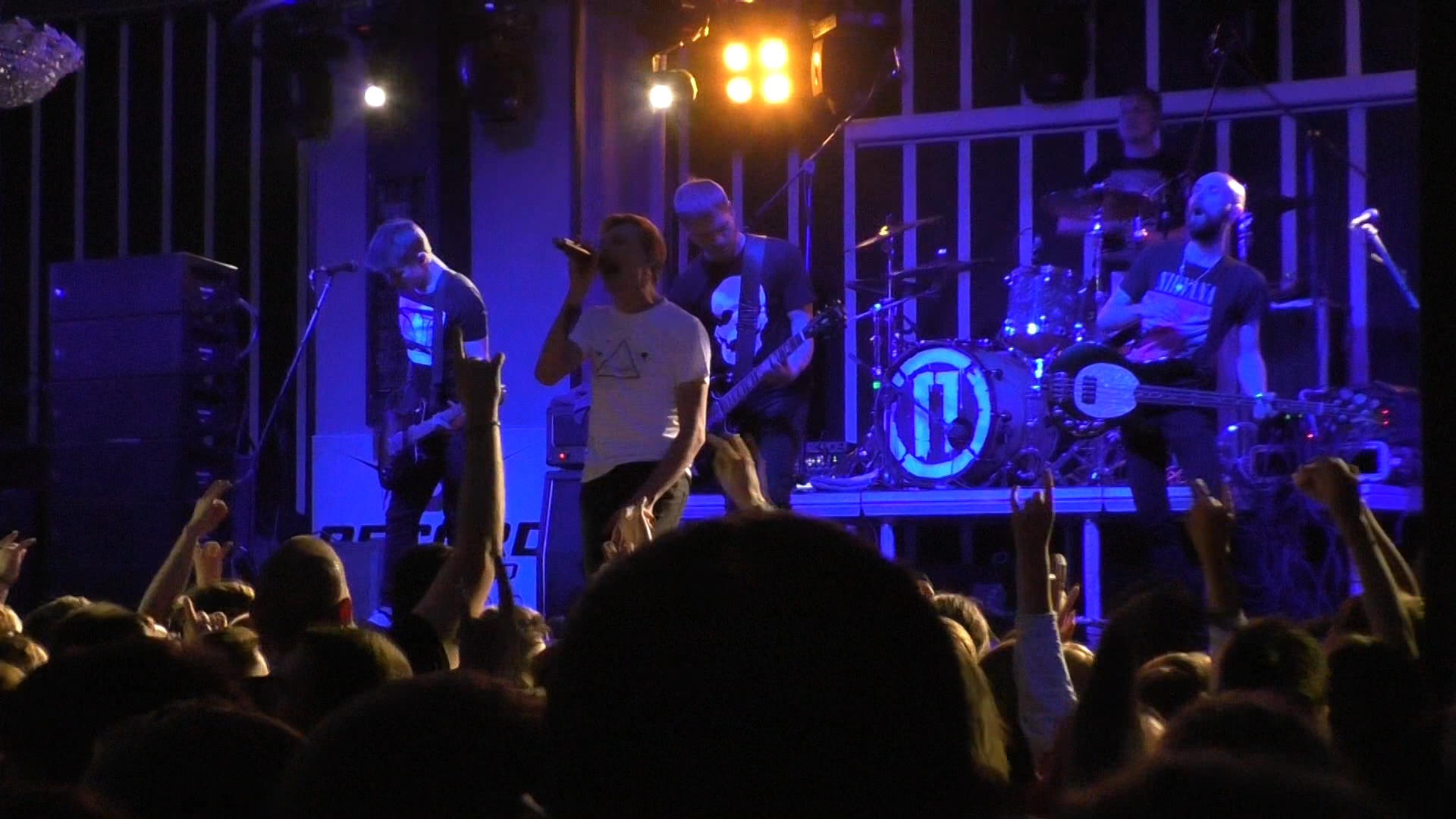
- Pornofilmy in 2018. Left to right: Vyacheslav Seleznev, Vladimir Kotlyarov, Aleksandr Rusakov, Kirill Muravyev, Aleksandr Agafonov

Background information
- Origin: Dubna, Moscow Oblast
- Genres: Punk-rock, grunge
- Years active: 2008 — present
- Members: Vladimir Kotlyarov; Igor Rybin; Aleksandr Rusakov; Aleksandr Agafonov; Kirill Muravyev
- Past members: Dmitriy Kuznecov; Aleksey Nilov
- Website: https://www.pornopunk.ru/

Pornofilmy (Russian: Порнофи́льмы, lit. 'porn movies') is a Russian punk band from the city of Dubna and one of the most popular existing rock bands in Russia. It was founded in 2008. The members of the band include lead vocalist and lyricist Vladimir Kotlyarov, solo guitarist Igor Rybin, rhythm guitarist and band manager Alexander Rusakov, drummer Kirill Muravyev, and bassist Alexander Agafonov.

The band stands out from other Russian punk-rock bands for their highly politicized lyrics and promotion of healthy living. All members of the band are vegetarians, and do not drink alcohol, use drugs, or smoke. The band initially gained popularity in Dubna, but after the release of their fourth album and the cancellation of a number of concerts by local authorities, they reached national fame and became one of the leading performers of rock music in Russia. Currently, Pornofilmy has 13 releases, including 8 studio albums and 5 mini-albums. Their latest studio album, "It Shall Pass", was released in January 2020. In the aftermath of the Russian invasion of Ukraine, the group relocated to Georgia.

== Name ==
According to vocalist Vladimir Kotlyarov, the name of the band is a metaphor for the reality surrounding them.

The name of the band was invented in our garage - I wanted the word to catch on, excite, and outrage. I heard it on some crime documentary on TV: they said that an underground workshop for the production of porn movies was liquidated. It seemed to me that this word was stupid, but cool for the name of the band. Over time, for many people this word became a proper name and lost its original meaning. Although there are still restrictions - for example, we will not be invited on TV. But we are not too upset: we still remain underground.

== History ==
=== Origins ===
The band was founded in 2008 by vocalist Vladimir Kotlyarov. Their first releases, from 2010-2011, were primarily experimental projects. The members of the band recorded all their music in their garage and initially mixed music themselves, but later hired a friend of the band to master for them.

=== Musical development and sobriety ===
In 2012, the members of the band publicly abandoned alcohol and smoking. The lifestyle changes became a prominent theme of the band's lyrics at the time. During this time, Pornofilmy began more actively working on their music and gaining popularity. The band would move away from experimentation, settling on their punk sound. They released five EPs that year, and two more would follow in 2013. The band's first full-length album, Molodost' i pank-rok (Russian: Молодость и панк-рок, lit. 'Youth and punk-rock'), was released in 2014.

=== Growth in popularity and charity involvement ===
In 2015, the band released their album Russkaya mechta. Chast 1 (Russian: Русская мечта. Часть 1, lit. 'Russian dream. Part 1'). The first track off the album, "Priezhay!" (Russian: Приезжай!, lit. 'Come!') is dedicated to a fan of the band who committed suicide due to a lack of understanding and support in his environment. The fan's mother later wrote a letter to the band asking them to write a song telling their young fans to never abandon hope for life, so that no one repeated her son's actions. The follow-up album, Russkaya mechta. Chast 2 (Russian: Русская мечта. Часть 2, lit. 'Russian dream. Part 2'), was released in March of 2016.

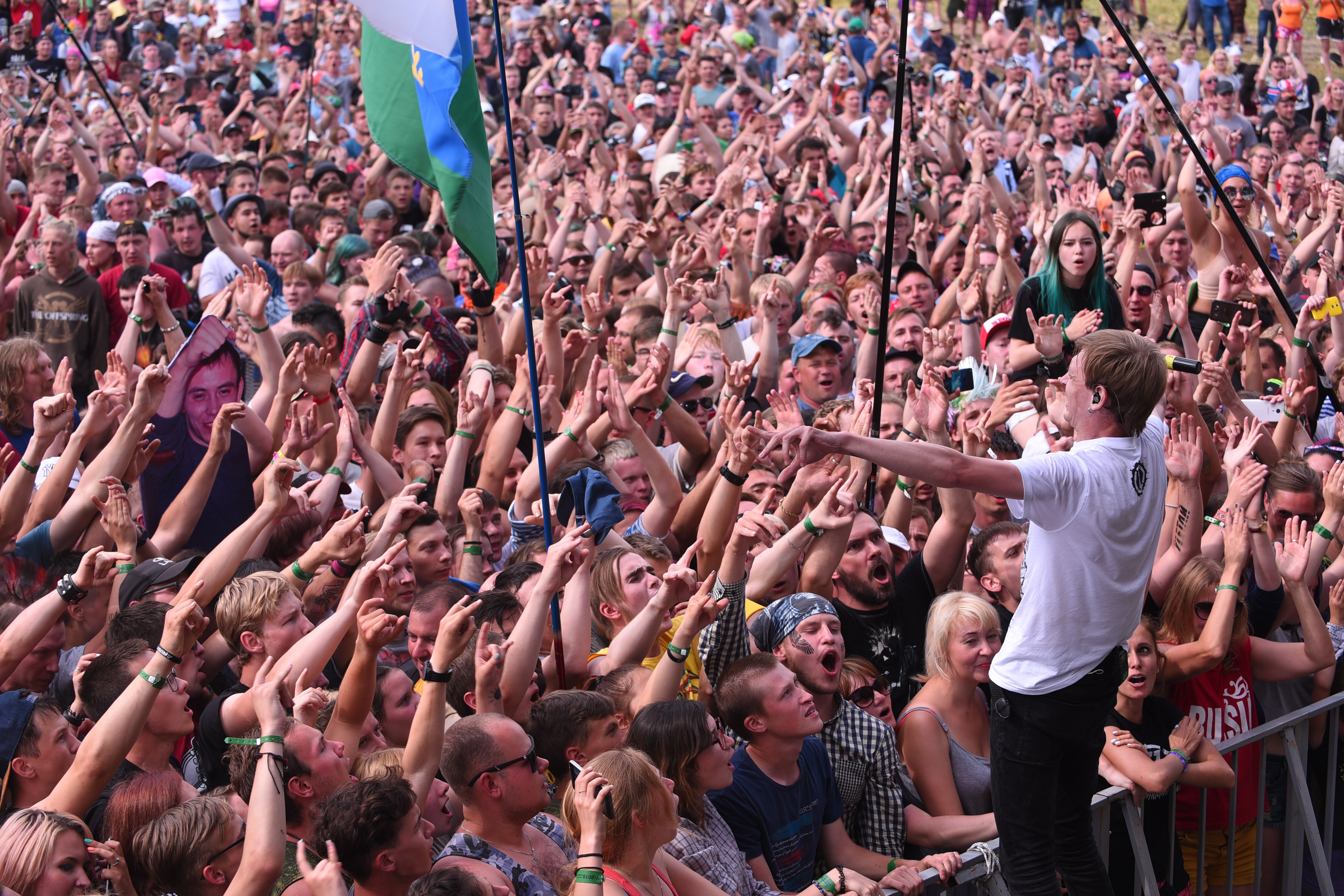
Pornofilmy at the Uletay rock festival in Udmurtia, Russia, July 2018

In October of 2016, motivated by the punk movement's promotion of mutual aid and charity, Kotlyarov decided to combine the release of their next album with a charity fundraiser. The members of the band involved themselves heavily in the entire process. Their experiences and challenges during this time directly influenced the lyrical content of the resulting album, V diapazone mezhdu otchayanyem i nadezhdoy (Russian: В диапазоне между отчаянием и надеждой, lit. 'In the interval between despair and hope'), released in 2017. The band's popularity grew immensely following this release and the release of their next album, Eto proydet (Russian: Это пройдёт, lit. 'This will pass'), in 2020.

That same year, the band gave a performance in Moscow's "Adrenalin" stadium and St. Petersburg's Ice palace stadium, as well as on Russian national TV on the Evening Urgant talk show.

== Charity ==
Vladimir Kotlyarov has stated on behalf of the band that their charity work is a result of their alignment with the ethics of the punk movement. Kotlyarov said in an interview that even early on, they were having doubts about the punk scene in Russia: "Why can one band raise a million rubles for an album, and people are ready to donate, but can't even bother to give a smaller sum to someone who needs help?" The band often performs at charity concerts.

In mid-2017, the band launched a crowdfunding project on the Planeta.ru website, where they announced the recording of a new album, adding that all the money raised would go not to the recording, but to the charitable foundation "Fund for the Fight Against Leukemia". Kotlyarov stated that the band's involvement in planning the fundraiser was very direct, and that they faced many unforeseen hurdles, including the choice of fundraiser: "We realized people are less motivated to donate to adults than to children. And we took up the challenge, for the adults — I suppose we wanted to set an example." Out of the requested 550,000 rubles. the band raised 909,101 rubles. For the same foundation, the band held an online acoustic concert where they collected additional money. In addition, they personally came to the hospital and distributed clothes, food and other goods for those in need.

In May 2018, the band visited a children's oncology center, where they held a music workshop, teaching the children about the basics of building melodies.

On April 1, 2020, the vocalist of the band Vladimir Kotlyarov played a third acoustic online charity concert in support of the Fund for the Fight Against Leukemia, which again raised over 950,000 rubles. Additionally, on the YouTube channel, regular users donated additional 855,000 rubles. The whole sum was given to the fund the next morning.

== Political views ==
The band has long been critical of Russian President Vladimir Putin and vocally opposed the Russian invasion of Ukraine in 2022. After the invasion, the band went into exile in Georgia.

== Controversies ==
=== Political views ===
The primary opposition to the band in Russia stems from their anti-government lyrics. They have faced accusations of political extremism and promoting violence.

In December 2016, the band's concert in Volgograd was canceled at the urgent request of the Volgograd Region Prosecutor's Office.

In October 2017, at the request of the federal security service and the city authorities, two concerts of the band were canceled in the Vladimir region, in the city of Murom, and in the Nizhny Novgorod region, in the city of Vyksa. Initially, the concert in Murom was to take place on October 21st at the club "Art Bar 111". However, Tatyana Makurina, the owner of the club, reportedly received a phone call from Anna Shishkina, chairwoman of the Murom Committee for the Development of the Consumer Market. According to Makurina, Shishkina demanded that the concert be canceled, accusing the band of promoting fascism and extremism. Later, Makurina was summoned to the regional prosecutor's office, where the prosecutor and the FSB explained that "Pornofilmy will not perform in the Vladimir region, because they are extremists". Makurina also reported receiving threats from the city officials:

We didn't want to cancel the concert, but we received a call from the Murom administration. We were told: “You see, Murom is a small city. Anything can happen with you, your business, and your family. ” They threatened that they would close my business, and I would not be able to work and live in Murom.

After the concert was moved to the neighboring town of Vyksa, the band was still unable to perform. According to the band's guitarist Alexander Rusakov, the club owners refused to hold the concert due to "phone threats about the possible closure of the establishment". As a result, the band's vocalist conducted an online broadcast of the band's acoustic concert on VKontakte.

On March 11, 2020, in the city of Chelyabinsk, the band was scheduled to perform at the Galaktika Club. The club cancelled the concert, citing a letter from the police in which it was said that the band's songs contain "obscene language, information encouraging children to take actions that pose a threat to life and health, promotion of drug use, rejection of family values, and disrespect for parents".

In June of 2023, the government of Kyrgyzstan canceled their concert in Bishkek. Kyrgyz authorities did not explain the decision, but the cause was speculated to be the heavy dependence of post-Soviet Kyrgyzstan on Russia and the influence of the Russian government.

=== Withdrawal from Nashestvie (2018) ===
In 2018, Pornofilmy was set to perform at the Nashestvie festival. Historically, the festival was held with the support of the Ministry of Defense of the Russian Federation, but that year the organizers announced that the Ministry of Defense would not participate, leading to a number of bands agreeing to perform at the festival. Two weeks prior to the festival date, the organizers revealed that this was not the case. On July 23, 2018, the band announced on its social media that it would no longer be participating in the event, stating, "No propaganda of militarism - this was our main condition for participation in the festival. Well, due to the situation, we have no other choice than to refuse to perform". Following Pornofilmy, in the next few days bands like Elysium, Yorsh, Distemper, Poshlaya Molli, and the singer Monetochka refused to participate in the festival for the same reason.

=== Name ===
The band has faced scrutiny for their controversial name, notably during their charity efforts from 2016-2017. When attempting to partner with a charity for their crowdfunding campaign, they were rejected by multiple organizations due to their name being too graphic.

Prior to this, in Ulan-Ude, posters with the name of the band were hung around the city to promote a concert. Local residents, thinking that it was an advertisement for pornography, began to write complaints to the city.

In January 2020, the FAS department in the Ulyanovsk region opened a case over the advertising of the band's concert. The complaint cited that the use of the band's name, suggesting pornographic material, was misleading to consumers as the poster did not clarify the fact that it was advertising a punk band.

== Discography ==
=== Studio albums ===
- Glue! (2010)
- Boring Life (2012)
- Karma of the workers
- Poor country (2013)
- Youth and Punk Rock (2014)
- Russian Dream. Part I (2015)
- Russian Dream. Part II (2016)
- In the Range Between Despair and Hope (2017)
- It Shall Pass (2020)

=== Mini albums ===
- You are in my sect (2011)
- Art (2012)
- How many bombs will go off? (2012)
- On all screens of the country (2012)
- White Flakes (2014)
- Resistance (2015)
- Like the last time (2016)

=== Singles ===
- "Our Names" (feat Lumen) (2015)
- "I'm so afraid" (2018)
- "Rituals" (2019)
