= Fourth-wave Russian emigration =

Emigration from Russia after the dissolution of the USSR

The fourth wave of Russian emigration took place after the collapse of the Soviet Union in 1991 when people began migrating from Russia in large numbers. This wave continues into the present, with the 2022 Russian invasion of Ukraine leading to considerable Russian emigration associated with the invasion.

== Economic and ethnic emigration ==
In 1991 the ban on leaving the premises of the Soviet republics was lifted. This corresponded with that in the 1990s, Russia suffered an economic depression. This caused some Russians to leave Russia. Emigration for ethnic reasons was especially strong with ethnic Germans going to Germany, Jews to Israel, and Greeks to Greece.

In the 2000s the flow of emigration gradually declined as the economy recovered, but then, from the starting of the 2010s, new bursts of political emigration arose, associated with the tightening of political rights.

== Emigration following 2022 invasion of Ukraine ==
Starting in February 2022, in connection with the 2022 Russian invasion of Ukraine, a new flow of political emigration began, associated with disagreement with the government. Following the announcement of mobilization on 21 September 2022, a huge surge in emigration from Russia occurred. Tickets to Armenia, Turkey, and Azerbaijan significantly increased, and car queues were formed at the border with Finland, Mongolia, and Kazakhstan.

== See also ==
- White émigré – Russian subject who left Imperial Russia
- 1990s post-Soviet aliyah – Migration of Jews from the former Soviet Union to Israel
- Russian emigration following the 2022 invasion of Ukraine – Ongoing migration of Russian citizens in response to the 2022 invasion of Ukraine
- Fifth wave Russian emigration – Emigration from Russia after the Russian invasion of Ukraine

== Books ==
- Вишневский А. Г., Зайончковская Ж. А. Миграция из СССР: четвёртая волна // Рабочие доклады Центра демографии и экологии человека. — М., 1991. — Вып. 3 (декабрь).
- Полян П. Эмиграция: кто и когда в XX веке покидал Россию // Россия и её регионы в XX веке: территория — расселение — миграции / Под ред. О. Глезер и П. Поляна. — М.: ОГИ, 2005.
