= Guide to the Free World =

Non-governmental organization for Russian emigrants

- Гайд в свободный мир
- Predecessor: Relocation Guide from the Russian Federation (Russian: "Гайд по релокации из РФ")
- Formation: February 22, 2022; 4 years ago
- Founder: Irina Lobanovskaya
- Founded at: Istanbul
- Type: Non-governmental organization
- Purpose: Helping people leave Russia after the 2022 Russian invasion of Ukraine
- Members: Roughly 200,000
- Official language: Russian
- Staff: 12
- Website: quick-woodwind-e16.notion.site/07a7b36083da441eac23278237650258

The Guide to the Free World (Russian: Гайд в свободный мир, romanized: Gaid v svobodniy mir), is a non-governmental organization dedicated to helping people leave Russia after the 24 February 2022 Russian invasion of Ukraine. It was founded and is headed by Ira Lobanovskaya (Russian: Ира Лобановская), a former marketing strategist. It maintains the eponymous Russian language Guide to the Free World website collating information, and the Relocation Guide from the Russian Federation (Russian: Гайд по релокации из РФ, romanized: Gaid po relokatsyy iz RF) Telegram chat that originated it, the largest such chat on the subject.

== Relocation Guide from the Russian Federation chat ==
Irina Lobanovskaya, a Russian citizen who spent a lot of time abroad, started the Russian language Telegram chat "Relocation Guide from the Russian Federation" (Russian: "Гайд по релокации из РФ") on 25 February 2022, the day after the 2022 Russian invasion of Ukraine. She wanted to gather the stories of the most recent émigrés in her closest circle of acquaintances, those who left Russia in the past two years, to serve as instructions for others who wanted to leave. She realized that there would be a demand, but not how much of one. She didn't advertise besides posting about the chat on Facebook. The chat started with 20 people who already lived outside Russia. After two days, there were 2000 people in the group; she remembers thinking that was many. After two weeks, by early March, there were over 100,000. There are other Telegram chats on this theme, but this is the largest.

The initial questions asked in the chat were, first, where people leaving Russia could go immediately, and second, what they could do when they got there. The primary destinations discussed were Georgia, Armenia, and Turkey, secondarily Mexico, Uzbekistan, Kyrgyzstan and Tajikistan. People would go where they traveled already, and where they could speak Russian. The initial people interested in leaving were from the creative industries and information technology workers. Later participants came from all social classes. By October 2022, there were over 50 subsidiary chats focusing on specific topics and countries.

Participants in the chat help on three levels. First, by providing and compiling the Guide to the Free World: how to leave Russia, where to go, what issues would be encountered at the border or upon arrival. Second, they help émigrés find work - they gather both resumes and companies willing to hire. Third, they discuss how to export Russian culture.

The chat is moderated, originally by Lobanovskaya, later also by moderators she knew and trusted. The chat's popularity brought spammers, scammers, and a wave of Kremlinbots, spreading disinformation that the moderators battle.

== Guide to the Free World ==
The Guide itself is a website of information collected from that regularly repeated in the chat, and from other media writing about where Russians could go without a visa. It contains information on how Russians can move to other countries, and what to do when they get there. It contains over 3,000 pages of instructions for 36 countries. It was published on a Notion platform, and first linked in the chat when the chat had approximately 10,000 people in it. It is regularly updated, usually 12-20 updates per day, with a digest of changes released in the chat. By July 2022, it had a staff of 12 editors, including three with a legal education.

On 22 September 2022, the day after the announcement of the 2022 Russian mobilization, the website received 1.5 million visits, as many as in the whole month of March when the guide was first published. Lobanovskaya reported that plane and train tickets for leaving Russia sold out even faster than at the start of the war. She said that after invasion and before the mobilization, the Guide to the Free World organization had helped 40,000 Russians escape the country; in the two days after the mobilization, it was another 100,000.

The Guide to the Free World non-profit collects donations to help Russians emigrate through the web page and the Telegram chat's built in donation system. Lobanovskaya says that it's crucial that the Guide remain a non-profit, that's part of the chat rules. She says she gets regular offers for advertising or other ways to monetize the project, laughs at the presumption of telling an IT marketer how to monetize products, and blocks the senders.

== Ira Lobanovskaya ==
Irina Lobanovskaya was born 16 March 1989, and grew up in Ust-Labinsk, in Krasnodar Krai in the North Caucasus. She was torn between studying mathematics and psychiatry, and decided to split the difference by attending the Saint Petersburg State University of Engineering and Economics to study advertising. She dropped out at the end of the fourth course, as the university required payment, and her parents had gone bankrupt in the 2008 crisis. She worked as a waitress until 2011, when she moved to Moscow. There she worked at different jobs, producing films, journalism, public relations, and media, until winning the only scholarship at the Wordshop advertising school in Moscow, supported by the BBDO advertising agency, and learning the work of a marketing strategist. Afterwards she worked with multiple Moscow marketing agencies, advertising both Russian and Western brands.

Lobanovskaya first visited the United States in 2016, intending to stay for a week, but that turned into six months. For the next six years she would be a citizen of the world, not living in one place for more than half a year, with the exception of two years in Silicon Valley. At the same time she began getting Russian language media attention. In March 2018, she wrote about the time she spent in Mexico after her four-month marriage and the death of her father from alcoholism. In April 2018, she was interviewed and photographed for an internationally published style article about her favorite outfits. In 2019, Schweppes and Afisha magazine called her one of their self-made heroes in an article about her favorite cocktail - non-alcoholic, as she had recently stopped drinking. In 2019 Lobanovskaya co-founded a San Francisco photography startup called Piqls, initially described as an Uber for photographs, allowing users to order a photographer who would arrive quickly and take photos on their smartphone, which later pivoted to business-to-business. Before Piqls closed in 2021, Russian media repeatedly interviewed her as an expert on Silicon Valley startups. Also in 2019 Lobanovskaya co-founded an online Russian language volunteer project called "Same" (after the English expression "same shit"), where people could share anonymous stories about their psychological and emotional problems. In 2020, she co-founded the social marketing platform Camp with the founders of Dobroshrift.

In February 2022, when she started the chat, Lobanovskaya worked as the marketing director in an information technology startup. She had returned to Russia, and left for Istanbul days before the Russian invasion of Ukraine. She was planning to move to New York City, for which she had received an O-1 visa (a temporary worker visa for the extraordinarily gifted), but changed her mind after the invasion. Instead, she spent all her time as an activist. One woman from Mariupol passing through Moscow wrote to her and Lobanovskaya personally helped her find housing, money and transportation. The first few days she fainted once, didn't shower, and only ate when friends brought food to her computer.

In March, as the Guide chat became more popular, Lobanovskaya was interviewed and written about by foreign language media, including RAI from Italy, and the New York Times from the United States. She realized that she risked legal charges for violating the Russian fake news laws or even for treason. She received threatening messages saying she had been reported to the Russian authorities - she says her favorite was: "It's good that you get out of Russia, but a pity that you won't be shot." She begged her mother to leave the country, but her mother refused, instead asking why she was doing this as she had a good life. In April, she lost her job at the IT startup because she was unable to interact with the Russian market.

Since the start of the Guide Lobanovskaya has been regularly cited as an expert on the Russian wave of emigration since the Russian invasion of Ukraine. Her estimate that 70,000 Russians had left or were planning to leave the country since the start of the war was cited internationally immediately after the 21 September 2022 Russian mobilization.

== See also ==
- Russian emigration following the 2022 invasion of Ukraine
