= Fifth wave Russian emigration =

Emigration from Russia after the Russian invasion of Ukraine

The fifth wave of Russian emigration (also Putin's emigration, sometimes "Putin's exodus") is emigration from Russia during the rule of Vladimir Putin. Researchers count the fifth wave either from the 2000s, when the composition of emigrants changed qualitatively and educated, promising people began to leave Russia; or from the mass protests of the early 2010s, Putin's return to the presidency and the establishment of a repressive authoritarian regime. In 2022, after the invasion of Ukraine and mobilization Russia went through two peaks of emigration, which became the largest in the modern history of the country. As of 2020, according to the UN, in terms of the number of emigrants in absolute numbers, Russia ranks 3rd in the world (10.65 million people or 6.8% of the population) after India (17.79 million people or 1.3% of the population) and Mexico (11.07 million people or 7.9% of the population).

== Until 2022 ==
=== Background ===
In the history of Russia in the 20th century, it is customary to distinguish four major waves of emigration: the White emigration during the Civil War and the 1920s (according to various estimates, from 1.4 to 2.9 million people); those who did not return to the USSR after World War II (0.5–1.5 million); the emigration of Soviet Jews, Germans and other peoples in the 1960s–1980s (about 576 thousand); as well as mass emigration from Russia after collapse of the USSR (to the USA, Canada, Israel, Germany and Finland alone in 1992–1999 – 805 thousand, the total number is estimated at up to 2.5 million). Some researchers consider the Jewish emigration of 1881–1914, caused by pogroms, political and religious oppression (1.9 million, one of the largest waves of emigration to the United States in history) to be a separate wave).

The emigration of the 1990s began with ethnic and repatriation, but in the second half of the decade it acquired a pronounced economic character. Western countries willingly granted refugee status to residents of the former USSR, supported the departure of qualified specialists with various grants and assistance programs. By the 2000s, these privileges were abolished, which led to a general reduction in the emigration flow, but new selection criteria appeared.

=== Definition ===
The fifth wave of Russian emigration falls on the period of Vladimir Putin's rule, but the question of its boundaries remains debatable. Some experts count Putin's emigration from the early 2010s, when the number of people leaving Russia increased sharply after the suppression of mass protests against election fraud, Putin's return to the presidency in 2012, repressions, economic stagnation, etc. Others consider the beginning of the wave to be Putin's first terms, when, against the backdrop of a reduction in the emigration flow, qualitative changes occurred in it that continued in the future: the number of educated and highly paid specialists increased significantly, and dissidents and political emigrants appeared for the first time in the post-Soviet period. In this case, the Putin exodus is divided into the period of the 2000s, associated with economic motives, and emigration after 2012, caused by a complex of cultural, political and economic factors.

=== Reasons ===
If the emigration of the 2000s was primarily economic in nature, then the second half of the Putin exodus is based on a more complex set of reasons: cultural and ethical (rejection of militarization, everyday racism, homophobia, dissatisfaction with the degradation of the education system and public institutions), economic (economic stagnation, corruption and lack of protection for business - with a marked increase in opportunities for remote employment), political (Putin's third presidential term, repressions, arbitrariness of the security forces, reduction of rights and freedoms, isolation of Russia). Bloomberg journalist Leonid Bershidsky characterized this period as the "emigration of disappointment" of the Putin era.

=== Characteristic ===
The fifth wave of emigration has a number of characteristic features that distinguish it from the fourth (post-Soviet) wave: youth, a high level of education and economic solvency (and, as a result, high adaptive potential), and an orientation toward European values. For those who left after 2012, there is an interest in Russian politics and a statistically significant desire to return to Russia after a change of regime (18% versus 8% for the period of the 2000s).

- John Herbst and Sergey Erofeev pointed out the youth of the new Russian emigration in their 2019 report "Putin's Exodus: The New Brain Drain," published by the Atlantic Council. The interviews and focus groups they conducted in major emigrant hubs mostly involved people aged 25–44.
- Emigrants of the second half of the fifth wave are distinguished by their high level of education – above the average for Russia, and also in comparison with global migration flows. 41 participants in Herbst and Erofeev's study received an education in the social sciences, 23% in the humanities, 20% in the natural sciences, 19% in the exact sciences, and 9% were trained in the arts.
- A significant portion of the fifth wave emigrants had relatively high-paying jobs (58% of the participants in the study that underlies the "Putin Exodus" report claimed that they earned enough to live comfortably in Russia). In terms of employment, income level, and consumption (including cultural consumption), the fifth wave emigrants are more likely to belong to the typical middle class.
- The fifth wave is represented by people of different political views, mostly liberal. In general, they adhere to European values, are skeptical about the idea of Russia's "special path", and see the Russia of the future as a "normal country" with political rights and economic freedoms, modern cultural values (comparing it with the Czech Republic, the Baltic states or Ukraine).
- Fifth wave emigrants do not feel nostalgia for the USSR, and perceive the 1990s as a time of freedom and opportunity, and not just economic upheaval.
- Fifth wave emigrants do not form diasporas and join them. New emigrants (especially those who left in the 2010s) treat earlier waves with distrust, perceiving them as bearers of anti-European, extremely conservative, nationalistic views, easily influenced by Russian propaganda and neo-imperialist ideas.
- The destinations of the fifth wave of emigration include the usual USA, Canada, Germany and Spain, as well as the countries of Southeast Asia, Latin America, New Zealand etc.

=== Number of people ===
Researchers of the fifth wave of emigration have emphasized the difficulty of determining its real scale due to the lack of an effective statistical accounting system in Russia. Russian Federal Statistics Service uses data from the Ministry of Internal Affairs, which takes into account deregistration without distinguishing between Russian citizens and foreigners (for example, citizens of post-Soviet countries working in Russia). The Federal Migration Service and the Ministry of Labor only take into account Russians who moved through companies licensed to employ abroad, which is why most of the data on labor migration relates to Russian sailors working on Russian ships under the flags of other countries. The Ministry of Foreign Affairs records emigration based on registration at Russian consular offices to receive services or documents. Finally, the Pension Fund only takes into account citizens who have applied for a pension abroad.

A more accurate source of information on Russian emigration is the national statistics of recipient countries, as well as aggregated data from the UN Population Division and Organization for Economic Cooperation and Development. The figures published by foreign agencies, as a rule, significantly exceed the Russian Federal Statistics Service data. Thus, in 2013-2014, Federal Statistics Service's figures for emigration to Spain were underestimated by 22 times, to France - by 14 times, to Germany by 8 times, to the USA - by 5–7 times. The Civil Initiatives Committee (CIC) of Alexei Kudrin in the 2016 report "Emigration from Russia in the Late 20th – Early 21st Century" considered it necessary to adjust Russian official data by 3–4 times upwards Russian Federal Statistics Service.

Given the limited quantity and quality of data, estimates of the size of the fifth wave of emigration varied. During a discussion on "Radio Liberty" sociologist Alexander Grebenyuk, citing statistics from recipient countries, spoke of 100,000 emigrants from Russia annually, the CIC estimated the exodus from Russia at 120,000–150,000 people each year, and the authors of the report "Putin's Exodus: A New Brain Drain" wrote about 1.6–2 million people who left for Western world alone in 2000–2019.

== After Russia's invasion of Ukraine (since 2022) ==
The Russian invasion of Ukraine on February 24, 2022, triggered a large-scale exodus comparable only to the white emigration. The first peak occurred in February–March, the second in September–October, after the announcement of mobilization. The main destinations were the countries of Central Asia (primarily Kazakhstan) and the South Caucasus (Armenia, Georgia), as well as Turkey, Montenegro, Serbia and Mongolia, where Russians could travel with a national passport or without a visa. Many subsequently changed their countries of residence, some more than once.

The non-profit organization OK Russians reported, based on surveys of more than 2,000 people in February and March, that the average age of those who left was 30–45 years old. Sociologist Margarita Zavadskaya also named the median age of emigrants as 32 years old (versus 46 in Russia). Two-thirds of those surveyed did not plan to emigrate, but left due to fear of border closures, the declaration of martial law and mobilization, due to fundamental disagreement with military aggression against Ukraine, and also due to the lack of prospects in Russia. Demographer Yulia Florinskaya predicted that the problem of brain drain would worsen: if previously 40–50% of emigrants had higher education, then after the start of the invasion, 80–90% had it.

In February–June alone, according to various estimates, between 150,000 and 776,000 people left Russia, which became the largest wave of emigration in the 21st century. More than 45% of emigrants previously worked in the information technology sector, 15% each in the cultural sphere, teaching, science and office work, 8% were journalists. Among those who emigrated in the first half of 2022, about a quarter had average or high income (versus 4% in Russia). Frankfurter Allgemeine Zeitung, citing sources in the leadership of European countries, reported about 400,000 people who left Russia due to mobilization, and sources in Russian Forbes cited estimates from 600,000 to 1 million people in the first two weeks.

A characteristic feature of the emigration that began after February 2022 was the sociability and mutual trust of those who left, mutual assistance and self-organization. Like the emigrants of 2012–2021, representatives of the anti-war wave are mainly politicized, expect a change in power and are considering the possibility of returning to Russia after the fall of Vladimir Putin's regime or his death.

== See also ==
- Fourth-wave Russian emigration
- 1990s post-Soviet aliyah
- Putin's aliyah

== Links ==
- Bykov, Dmitry (2023-04-13). "Exile as Colonization: Why Our Emigrant Has Always Been the Most Demanded Russian Commodity". Novaya Gazeta (in Russian).
