= Russian emigration during the Russo-Ukrainian war (2022–present) =

During the Russo-Ukrainian war since February 2022, more than 300,000 Russian citizens and residents are estimated to have left Russia by mid-March 2022, at least 500,000 by the end of August 2022, and an additional 400,000 by early October, for a total of approximately 900,000. This number includes economic migrants, conscientious objectors, and some political refugees. However, many emigrants have returned to Russia in the ongoing process, sometimes due to hostility and discrimination, but also because of other factors, such as the difficulty of legalisation, finding stable work, and a flourishing community. At the same time, more than 70% of Russian emigrants said they were afraid of repression by the Russian government.

== Reasons for exodus ==
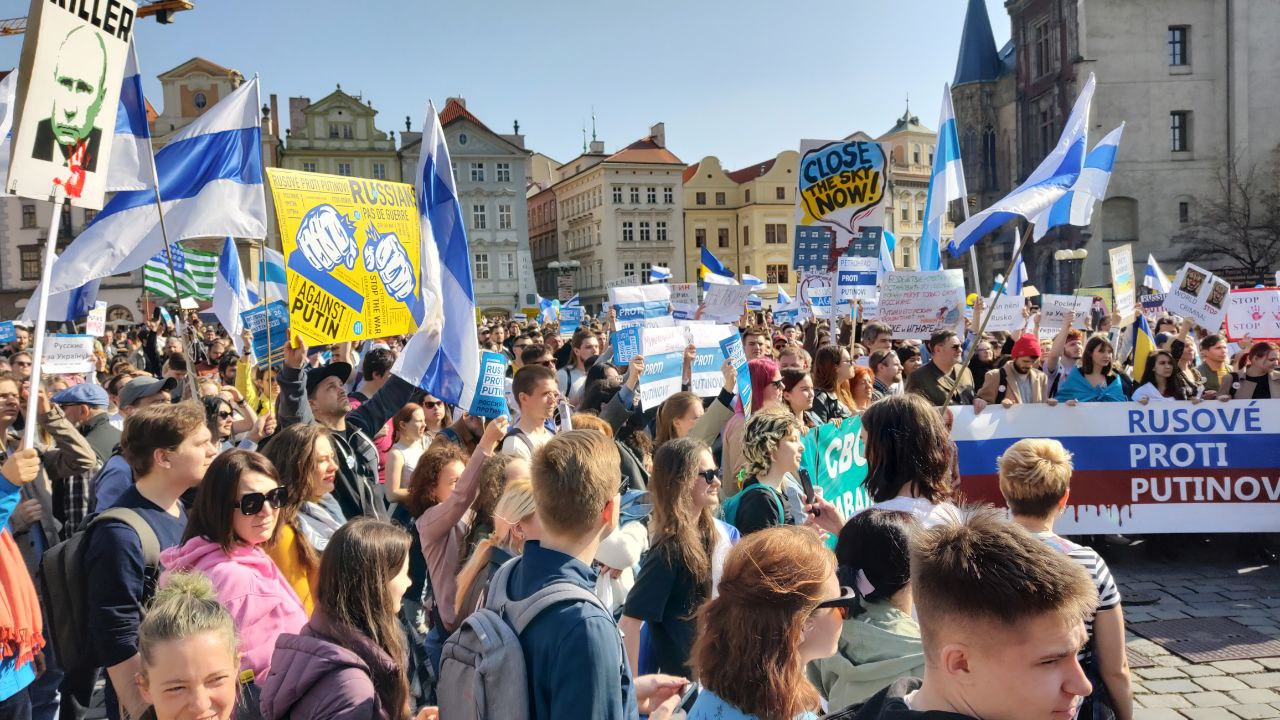
Protest of Russians living in the Czech Republic against the war in Ukraine. People fleeing Russia are mostly young and educated. Protesters in the photo are flying the White-blue-white flag.

There have been at least three waves of Russian emigration.

=== First wave ===
In the first wave, immediately after Russia invaded Ukraine in February 2022, journalists, politicians, and tech workers fled. Many sought to evade criminal prosecution for exercising free speech regarding the invasion. In March, President Vladimir Putin introduced prison sentences of up to 15 years for publishing "fake news" about Russian military operations. More than 2,000 people were charged by May 2022 under the laws prohibiting "fake" information about the military. Nina Belyayeva, a Communist Party deputy in the Voronezh Oblast Legislative Assembly, stated that she fled Russia due to threats of criminal prosecution and imprisonment for having spoken against the invasion, saying, "I realized that it was better to leave now. Once a criminal case is opened, it could be too late." Journalist Boris Grozovski stated that "We are refugees. Personally, I was wanted by the police in Russia for distributing anti-war petitions... We ran not from bullets, bombs and missiles, but from prison. If I wrote what I write now while in Russia, I would inevitably go to prison for 15–20 years." Actress Chulpan Khamatova stayed in exile in Latvia after she signed a petition against the war in Ukraine. She stated: "it was made clear to me it would be undesirable for me to go back," adding "I know I am not a traitor. I love my motherland very much." Bolshoi Ballet dancer Olga Smirnova left Russia to continue her career in the Netherlands in protest of the war. As for tech workers, for many it was made clear that they would have to leave Russia as a condition of employment; in any case, many tech workers can work remotely. According to a Russian IT industry trade group, approximately 50,000–70,000 IT workers fled in the invasion's first month.

Among the Russians who left Russia after the invasion of Ukraine were pop musician Alla Pugacheva and comedian Maxim Galkin, television journalist Alexander Nevzorov, diplomat Boris Bondarev, politician and economist Anatoly Chubais, businessman Oleg Tinkov, rapper Oxxxymiron, activist Diana Isakova, theater director Dmitry Krymov, political activist Maxim Katz, former paratrooper Pavel Filatyev, political activist Lev Ponomaryov, the rave band Little Big, anti-war activist Grigory Sverdlin, director Kirill Serebrennikov, rock musician Zemfira, actress Renata Litvinova, journalists Yury Dud and Andrei Loshak, novelist Lyudmila Ulitskaya, film critic Anton Dolin and literary critic Galina Yuzefovich. Levada Center polls from 2022 indicated that there were at least 30 million pro-European Russians who opposed the war, but very few of them were able to leave Russia. Galina Yuzefovich said that leaving Russia is a "privilege" for those who can "afford it".

As of December 2022, more than 4,000 people were prosecuted under "fake news" laws in connection with the war in Ukraine. Russian journalist Maria Ponomarenko was sentenced to six years in prison for publishing information about the Mariupol theatre airstrike. At least 1,000 Russian journalists have fled Russia since February 2022.

=== Second wave ===
A second wave became apparent by July 2022, and this wave consisted more generally of middle and upper class people and parents who had required longer to prepare to emigrate, for example; people with businesses or people who had to wait for their children's school year to end.

In June, it was expected that around 15,000 millionaires would leave Russia in 2022.

=== Third wave ===
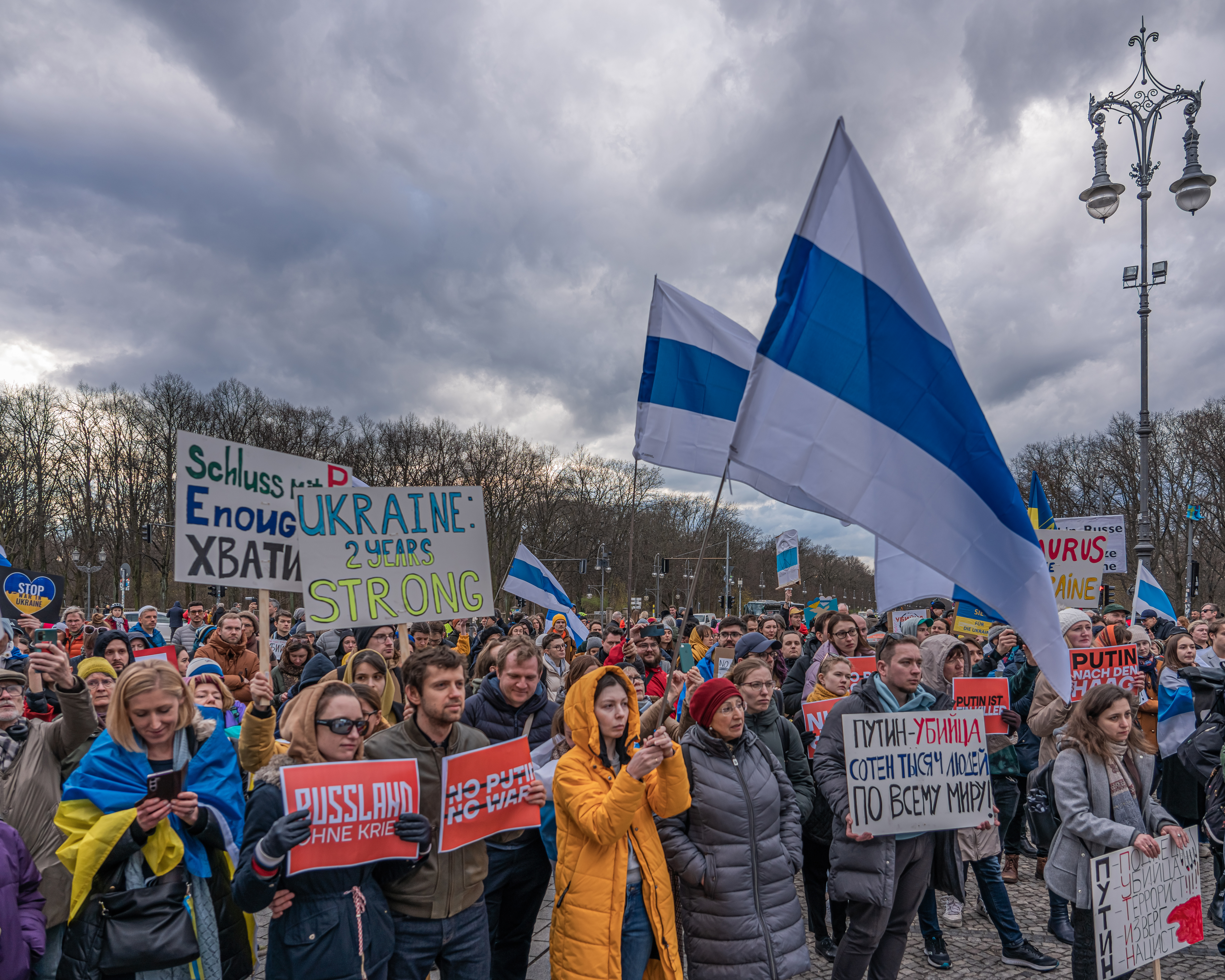
Russian emigrants in Berlin, Germany, 25 February 2024

Following Putin's announcement of partial mobilization on 21 September 2022, a third wave of Russian emigration began, with estimates of hundreds of thousands of male citizens fleeing. In the first week after the announcement, 98,000 Russians fled to Kazakhstan. On 24 September alone over 8,500 Russians entered Finland by land, a 62% increase on the previous Saturday. On the following day, it was reported that "On the border with Georgia, queues of Russian cars stretch back more than 30 kilometres (19 mi)," while at checkpoints bordering the regions of Kostanay and Western Kazakhstan, "footage of cars queuing to leave Russia show lines that stretch as far as the eye can see."

In this third wave alone, nearly 300,000 Russian citizens had left Russia before 27 September, with that number approaching 400,000 by 4 October. An upper estimate is for 700,000 Russians to have fled mobilization since it was announced. Many went to Kazakhstan, Serbia, Turkey, the United Arab Emirates, Georgia, and Finland.

On 28 October, Russian president Vladimir Putin announced that mobilization had been completed, though legally it still continues. After that some people continued to emigrate for political and economic reasons, while some decided to return home.

Putin signed a decree introducing prison terms of up to 15 years for wartime acts, including voluntary surrender and desertion during mobilization or war.

Actor Artur Smolyaninov fled Russia in October 2022. He was charged for "discrediting" the military under the "fake news" laws, for making anti-war statements after he had left Russia.

== Destinations ==
Among the destinations chosen by Russian nationals are Turkey, with more than 100,000 Russians seeking residence, many using Turkish Airlines to fly to Antalya. Georgia and Armenia also received large numbers. By early April, an estimated 100,000 Russians had fled to Georgia, and 50,000 went to Armenia. In 2022, 104,000 Russian citizens have registered their stay in Serbia.

In Latin America, by January 2023, Argentina received more than 5,000 pregnant Russian women , who chose to have their children there due to the ease of obtaining a visa, the automatic obtaining of free healthcare, and nationality for the newborn. In 2023, 37,700 Russians entered Argentina and 13,000 within the first three months of 2024; with 3,750 of them gaining residence.

Other major destinations include Azerbaijan, the United Arab Emirates, Greece, Bulgaria, Romania, Kazakhstan, Kyrgyzstan, Uzbekistan, Spain, Israel, Tajikistan, Mongolia, Latin American countries, the Baltic states, Australia, Canada and the United States.

As the majority of European countries closed their airspace to Russian flights following the invasion, Russians seeking to leave the country have often had to take detours through the Caucasus or have had to find overland routes. On 25 March 2022, the high-speed railway between Saint Petersburg and Helsinki was suspended by Finnish state railway operator VR, closing the last direct train route between Russia and the European Union. The route had previously been a significant passage out of Russia for Russian citizens, particularly those who already had work or residence connections to Finland and the rest of Europe.

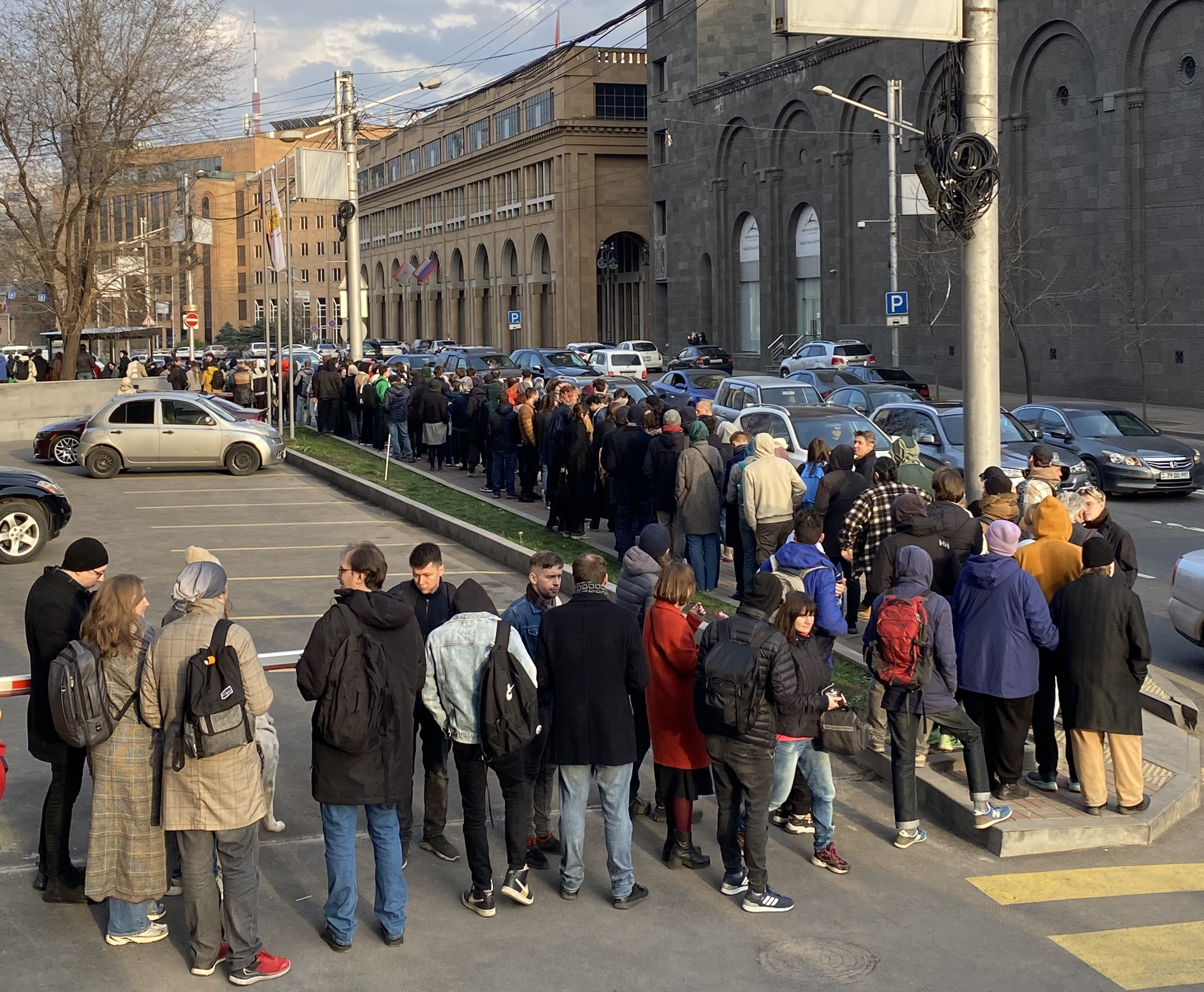
Russian emigrants outside the Russian embassy in Yerevan, Armenia as part of the "Noon Against Putin" protest, 17 March 2024

Several EU countries, such as Latvia and the Czech Republic, have suspended granting visas to Russian citizens, complicating their exit from Russia. Some countries have allowed temporary stays without a visa. Turkey, for example, has allowed Russian citizens without visas to stay for up to two months. However, Finland, Poland, and the Baltic countries of Latvia, Lithuania, and Estonia announced they will not offer refuge to Russians fleeing mobilization. In contrast, Germany offered asylum to Russian oppositionists and conscripts who did not want to go to war with Ukraine.

Two Russian nationals claimed asylum in the United States after sailing in a small boat to Alaska.

At least five yachts carrying Russian nationals have attempted to enter a number of South Korean ports, but only two Russian passengers were allowed entry.

Most hotel rooms and Airbnbs in Kazakhstan were sold out to Russian immigrants within days.

In contrast to the official exit polls and results of the 2024 Russian presidential election both inside and outside of Russia, unofficial exit polls of the votes cast abroad showed a much poorer performance for Vladimir Putin. According to the Vote Abroad project, Putin won 3% in Serbia; 5% in Istanbul; Turkey; 6% in Argentina; 8% in Yerevan; Armenia, 9% in Kazakhstan; 10% in Thailand; 15% in Vietnam; and 16% in Tel Aviv, Israel.

== Difficulties faced by emigrants ==
Amnesty International noted that many Russian political emigrants, who entered the European Union on Schengen visas, become illegal immigrants after 90 days because they do not want to submit applications for asylum due to the impossibility of continuing their activities as journalists, human rights activists, etc. in such a case. In addition, many Russian oppositionists and representatives of civil society, who are in Russia or who had migrated to other non-safe countries from Russia (for example, to CIS-countries), do not have Schengen visas and have difficulties in obtaining them. In this regard, on 25 May 2022, Amnesty International encouraged the Cabinet of Germany to expand the programme of humanitarian admission (German: humanitäre Aufnahmeprogramme) for Russians persecuted by Putin's regime. This programme should include humanitarian visa issuance and granting of temporary residence and work permits. According to the EU directive from 2022, member states should not accept visa applications from Russians in a third country.

== Impact ==
Those who have fled tend to be young and well-educated professionals, leading some economists to suggest that the Russian brain drain is worsening. More than 50,000 Russian information technology specialists have left Russia.

== Reactions ==
=== Azerbaijan ===
On 1 July 2025, Azerbaijani authorities arrested eight Russian nationals who appeared in court in Baku with obvious signs of beatings, in apparent retaliation for the deaths of two Azerbaijanis in police custody in Yekaterinburg. Some of the Russian detainees were identified as IT professionals who fled to Azerbaijan after Russia announced partial mobilization in 2022.

=== Georgia ===
Since the outbreak of the war in Ukraine, approximately 200,000 Russian citizens entered Georgia from Russia, of which 60,000 have remained in the country while others have crossed into Turkey and Armenia. The peak of migration came at the period of mobilization in Russia.

The migration has reportedly helped the Georgian economy to grow faster and the Georgian lari to steadily get stronger. However, the arrival of Russians has also reportedly made real estate prices skyrocket in Tbilisi; in November 2022, average real estate prices were 210% higher than 1 year prior. An important factor in this is that Russian migrants, often wealthy, are ready to pay much higher sums than Georgians for apartments. This has rendered rent unaffordable for some Georgian locals, exacerbating pre-existing tensions between Russians and Georgians caused by the recent Russo-Georgian War and the fact that 20% of Georgian territory is occupied by Russia.

Other causes of tension are cases of Russian migrants behaving aggressively and demanding to be served in Russian and to be allowed to pay in Russian rubles. Screenshots of alleged Russian users (from a large Telegram group of people crossing the Russo-Georgian border) complaining they were not allowed entry into Georgia because of Z signs on their cars went viral on the Georgian and Ukrainian internet.

In October 2022, small-scale protests were held demanding the introduction of a visa regime with Russia, with the ruling Georgian Dream party dismissing such a step as "irrational."

The FSB has sent agents to infiltrate Georgia amidst the immigration wave. Once exposed, the news "barely makes a ripple" in Georgia's media.

Russian exiles in Georgia may be tried in absentia by courts in Russia for attending anti-war rallies. The activities of anti-war Russians abroad are monitored by Russia's Centre for Combating Extremism. Some Russian exiles in Georgia supported the Georgian pro-democracy opposition and participated in the 2023 Georgian protests.

According to a September–October 2023 opinion poll, 93% of Georgians are against allowing Russians to register a business or buy real estate in Georgia. More than 30,000 Russians left Georgia in 2023.

=== Serbia ===
Russians can travel to Serbia without a visa. Due to the historical and cultural proximity of Serbia and Russia, Russian emigrants are generally welcome in Serbia, but there have been clashes between pro-Putin Serbian nationalists and anti-war Russian migrants. According to data from the Serbian Ministry of Interior from early 2023, more than 200,000 Russians had traveled to Serbia since February 2022.

According to Serbian authorities, there were 30,000 Russian nationals with temporary residence in Serbia in May 2023. Some anti-war Russians have been labeled a potential 'national security' risk by the Serbian authorities and face deportation to Russia. Naturalization process for former Russian citizens is unofficially stopped, and dozens of people are stuck as stateless persons.

=== Israel ===
Despite expecting mostly Jewish refugees from Ukraine, Israel has seen more arrivals from Russia. While Israel relaxed the "Law of Return" for Ukrainian emigrants, it did not extend that measure to Russian emigrants, who have instead obtained tourist visas while starting the citizenship application process.

=== Kazakhstan ===
In September 2022, Kazakhstani president Kassym-Jomart Tokayev claimed that Kazakhstan would help fleeing Russians, saying that "most of them are forced to leave because of the current hopeless situation."

In 2022, Kazakhstan agreed to share the personal data of exiled anti-war Russians with the Russian government. In September 2022, Kazakh authorities detained a Russian journalist wanted in Russia on charges of "discrediting" the Russian military.

In December 2022, Kazakhstan deported a Russian citizen, a former presidential guard, who fled mobilization; Kazakhstan denied his asylum claim in late November while human rights activists have said that the country's law on refugees allows him to stay in Kazakhstan while his lawyers appeal.

In January 2023, Kazakhstan announced they were tightening visa rules, a move that is expected to make it more difficult for Russians to remain in the country. Kazakhstan said it would extradite Russians wanted for evading mobilization.

=== Kyrgyzstan ===
In 2023, Kyrgyzstan agreed to share the personal data of exiled anti-war Russians with the Russian government. In June 2023, Kyrgyzstan deported Russian anti-war activist Alexei Rozhkov to Russia.

In June 2023, the government of Kyrgyzstan canceled the concert by the Russian rock band Pornofilmy in Bishkek. The band vocally opposed the Russian invasion of Ukraine and went into exile in Georgia. Kyrgyz authorities did not explain the decision, but the real reason may be that post-Soviet Kyrgyzstan is heavily dependent on Russia and under the influence of the Russian government.

=== Russia ===
On 16 March 2022, President Vladimir Putin issued a warning to Russian "traitors", claiming that the West "wanted to use them as a fifth column" and that Russians would always be able to "distinguish the true patriots from the scum and the traitors." While some experts said Putin's ire was directed toward what he perceived to be wavering loyalty among Russian elites, and in particular, Russian oligarchs, statements from Kremlin officials have also broadly labeled those who fled as "traitors," as spokesman Dmitry Peskov affirmed the following day to Reuters:

"In such difficult times…Many people show their true colors…They vanish from our lives themselves. Some people are leaving their posts. Some are leaving their active work life. Some leave the country and move to other countries. That is how this cleansing happens."

On 4 November 2022, Dmitry Medvedev, the deputy chairman of Russia's Security Council and former Russian president, called the Russians who fled Russia after the invasion "cowardly traitors" and said that Russia was "stronger and cleaner" without them. On 28 December 2022, he said that Russians who fled Russia after the invasion of Ukraine and are opposed to the war should be labeled "enemies of society" and barred from returning to Russia. Medvedev called for the use of death squads against politically active Russian exiles.

In January 2023, Russian lawmaker Yevgeny Popov proposed canceling the passports of Russians who fled abroad after Russia invaded Ukraine. Vyacheslav Volodin, speaker of the State Duma, called the anti-war Russians in exile "scoundrels" and wanted the confiscation of their properties in Russia.

=== Ukraine ===
On 23 March 2022, Ukrainian president Volodymyr Zelenskyy called on Russians to emigrate from Russia so as not to finance the war in Ukraine with their taxes. However, by August, he had called on Western countries to ban all Russian citizens from entering, including those opposed to the war, stating that Russians should "live in their own world until they change their philosophy."

Ukrainian film director and producer Alexander Rodnyansky, who worked in Russia in the past and spoke openly against the war and Putin's regime, published an opinion piece in the Financial Times urging the West not to isolate Russians who oppose Putin and were either forced to leave the country or trapped under Putin's regime.

=== United States ===
While the United States has received Russian applications for asylum since the start of the invasion, it has warned against the increased trend of unauthorized entry: in one example, a maritime incursion by Russian nationals on a charter boat in Key West, Florida, was initially characterized by the Department of Homeland Security as a "national security event," with the intercepted migrants subsequently scheduled to be deported.

On 27 September 2022, White House press secretary Karine Jean-Pierre encouraged Russian men fleeing their home country to avoid being drafted to apply for asylum in the United States.

In early 2023, the Biden administration resumed deportations of Russians who had fled Russia due to mobilization and political persecution. Texas-based attorney Jennifer Scarborough said that "In March of 2022, the US said they were stopping deportations to Russia because of the political situation – so I don't understand why they restarted it and they did it so quietly."

=== Germany ===
In 2022, German Chancellor Olaf Scholz stated that Russian deserters and draft evaders who refused to take part in the Russian invasion of Ukraine should be protected in Germany. However, in 2024, German authorities ordered the deportation of Russian nationals who wanted to avoid mobilization and criticized Putin's government on the grounds that they would not face persecution in Russia.

=== Czech Republic ===
In 2024, the Czech political party STAN, which was part of Petr Fiala's cabinet, launched a campaign against Russian emigrants and the Russian minority in the Czech Republic with the slogan, "We don't need Putin's matryoshka dolls in the Czech Republic!" On 6 February 2025, Czech President Petr Pavel signed a bill prohibiting Russians from obtaining Czech citizenship, even if they have lived in the Czech Republic for many years.

=== Thailand ===
In January 2024, members of the self-exiled rock band Bi-2, who fled Russia after Russia's invasion of Ukraine and publicly denounced the war and Putin's regime, were arrested in Thailand for allegedly violating immigration regulations and faced possible deportation to Russia because some of its members have Russian citizenship. In February 2024, members of the group were sent to Israel instead.

=== Indonesia ===
In January 2024, Russian émigré and war critic Maxim Galkin was denied entry to Bali, Indonesia, at the request of the Russian government.

=== Vietnam ===
At the request of the Kremlin, Vietnam deported several Russian citizens living in Vietnam because they criticized Russia's invasion of Ukraine.

=== United Arab Emirates ===
In 2024, exiled Russian rapper and war critic Morgenshtern had his concerts in the UAE cancelled and was denied entry to Dubai, where he had lived for several years, after Russian authorities blacklisted him and labeled him a "foreign agent."

=== Sri Lanka ===
In February 2024, Russian and Ukrainian nationals in Sri Lanka with extended visas due to the Russian invasion of Ukraine were asked to leave the country within two weeks.

== See also ==
- 2022 anti-war protests in Russia – Protests opposing the invasion of Ukraine
- Ukrainian refugee crisis – Ongoing refugee crisis in Europe
- Draft evasion in Russia – Intentional non-compliance with military conscription
- Guide to the Free World – Non-governmental organization for Russian emigrants
- Protest emigration – Emigration as an activist tactic
- Immigration to Russia
- War resister – Person who resists war
- White émigré – Russian subject who left Imperial Russia
- White-blue-white flag – flag used by Russian nationals, especially those living abroad, who oppose the war
- Fourth-wave Russian emigration – Emigration from Russia after the dissolution of the USSR
- List of Soviet and Eastern Bloc defectors
- Aging of Russia – Aging population of Russia
