= Embassy of Brazil, Moscow =

Coordinates: 55°45′30″N 37°35′19″E

Embassy of Brazil in Moscow
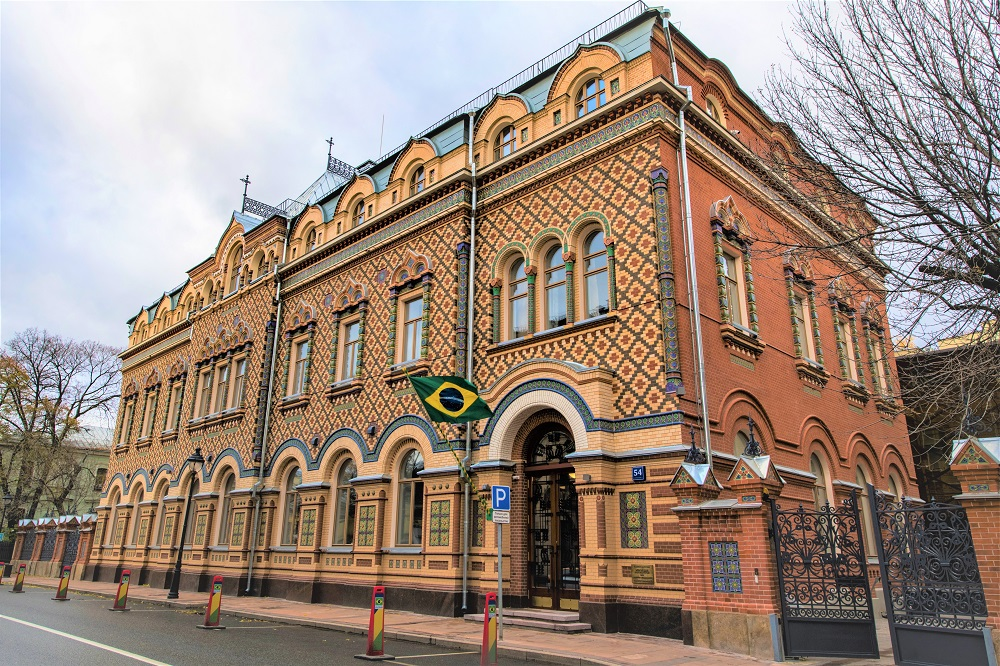
- Main building of the Embassy of Brazil in Moscow complex in 2020. Previously known as "Lopatina House", built in 1876.
- Location: Moscow

The Embassy of Brazil in Moscow is the diplomatic mission of Brazil to the Russian Federation and to the Republic of Uzbekistan. Since 28 October 1963 the Embassy and the Residence of the Brazilian Ambassador are located at 54 Bolshaya Nikitskaya Street (Russian: ул. Большая Никитская, 54) in the Presnensky District of Moscow.

The main unit in the embassy complex is also known as Lopatina House, built in 1876. Designed by Alexander Kaminsky one of the most important Russian architects between 1860 and 1880, the construction is one of the first and rare examples of civil construction in the city in a pseudo-Russian style, marked by references from traditional Russian culture before the "Peter the Great" era.

From early 2019 until late 2020, due to the restoration of the main building, the Residence of the Brazilian ambassador was temporarily at Tsvetkov's mansion.

== See also ==
- Brazil–Russia relations
- Diplomatic missions in Russia
