= Russian Brazilians =

Russian Brazilians Russo-brasileiros Русские бразильцы
- (Brazil) (Russia)
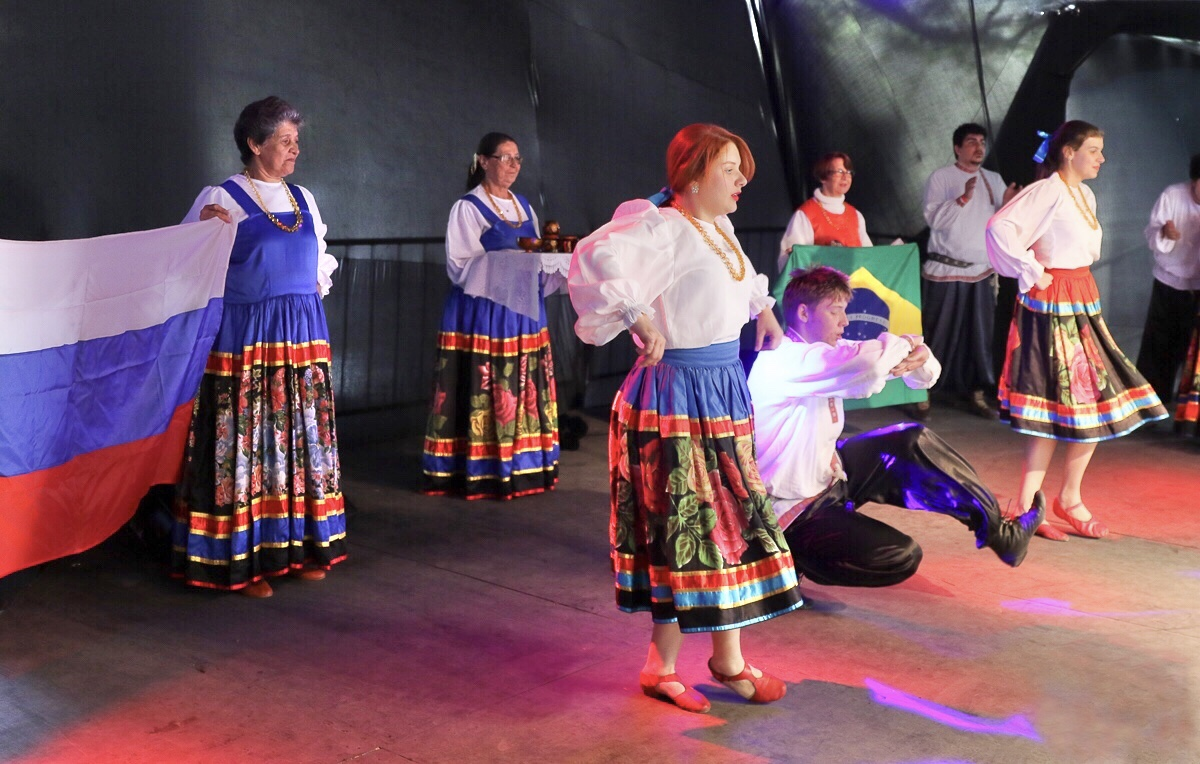
- Russian descendants in São Paulo.

Total population
- 200,000

Regions with significant populations
- Rio Grande do Sul, São Paulo, Minas Gerais, Goiás, Paraná, Rio de Janeiro, Santa Catarina and Pernambuco

Languages
- Portuguese · Russian

Religion
- Judaism · Roman Catholicism · Russian Orthodox

Related ethnic groups
- Other Brazilians of Slavic origin, such as Polish Brazilians and Ukrainian Brazilians

Russian Brazilians (Portuguese: Russo-brasileiros, Russian: Русские бразильцы Russkiye Brazil'tsy) are Brazilian citizens of full or partial Russian ethnic background or Russian-born people residing in Brazil. The term can also refer to someone with a Brazilian mother and Russian father, or vice versa.

However many are White Russians who arrived in Brazil right after the Russian Civil War in the 1920s. In the 1950s, a wave of Chinese immigrants belonging to the country's ethnic Russian community also arrived in Brazil.

Fernando Lázaro de Barros Basto in Síntese da história da imigração no Brasil (1970) gives a total number of 319,215 immigrants from "Russia" (i.e. the Russian Empire pre-1917 and the Soviet Union post-1917) for the period of 1871 to 1968.

On the other hand, the São Paulo Immigrant Memorial puts the number of said immigrants between 1870 and 1953 at 118,600. Ethnic Russians were only a small portion of this number while the majority were Poles, Ukrainians, Germans, Jews and Balts emigrating from Russian/Soviet territories.

According to information from the Embassy of the Russian Federation in Brazil and from the consulates, 35,000 Russians resided in Brazil in 2018. According to Igor Chnee, author of the book Imigração russo no Brasil, estimated that around 1.8 million descendants of Russian immigrants and refugees (including Russian Germans and Russian Jews) lived in Brazil in the 2010s.

The Brazilian states with more descendants include Rio Grande do Sul, São Paulo, Minas Gerais, Goiás and Paraná, in addition to a presence in Rio de Janeiro, Santa Catarina and Pernambuco. In São Paulo, the community founded the Brazilian Russian Association (ARB) which seeks to rescue and preserve the culture of these descendants.

In 2022 onwards, there was an acceleration of Russian couples moving to Brazil. Pregnant women in Russia seeking to give birth to their babies with Russian husbands in Brazil. The main reason reported in surveys among Russian pregnant women was the excellent hospital service in Brazil, considered "humanized" and the rights of children of Russian origin to have Brazilian citizenship, which guarantees them the ability to visit various countries around the world without visas or bans. Under the terms provided for by art. 12 of the Federal Constitution of Brazil, a condition that subsequently allows parents and siblings to request a permanent residence permit in Brazil for family reunion. Under Brazilian law, the baby's parents immediately receive a residence permit in Brazil, and a year later the Russian parents can apply for Brazilian naturalization, as long as they live in Brazil and take a Portuguese test. Among the priority destinations for Russians are Florianópolis and Rio de Janeiro.

== History ==
The first wave of Russians moving to Brazil refers to the period from 1921 to the late 1930s. The arrival of general Wrangel's soldiers and officers, in 1921. The resettlement of Russian-speaking farmers from Romanian Bessarabia in 1923-1930s. And the 'secondary' migration of Nansen refugees from Europe during the 1930s. The second wave represents the post-war subsidized migration of Russian displaced persons, and the third one is the resettlement of the Russians from China during the 1950s. It is also noted that anti-Soviet sentiments in Brazilian politics, starting from the mid-1930s, had a negative impact on preservation of the Russian language and Russian culture in the country.

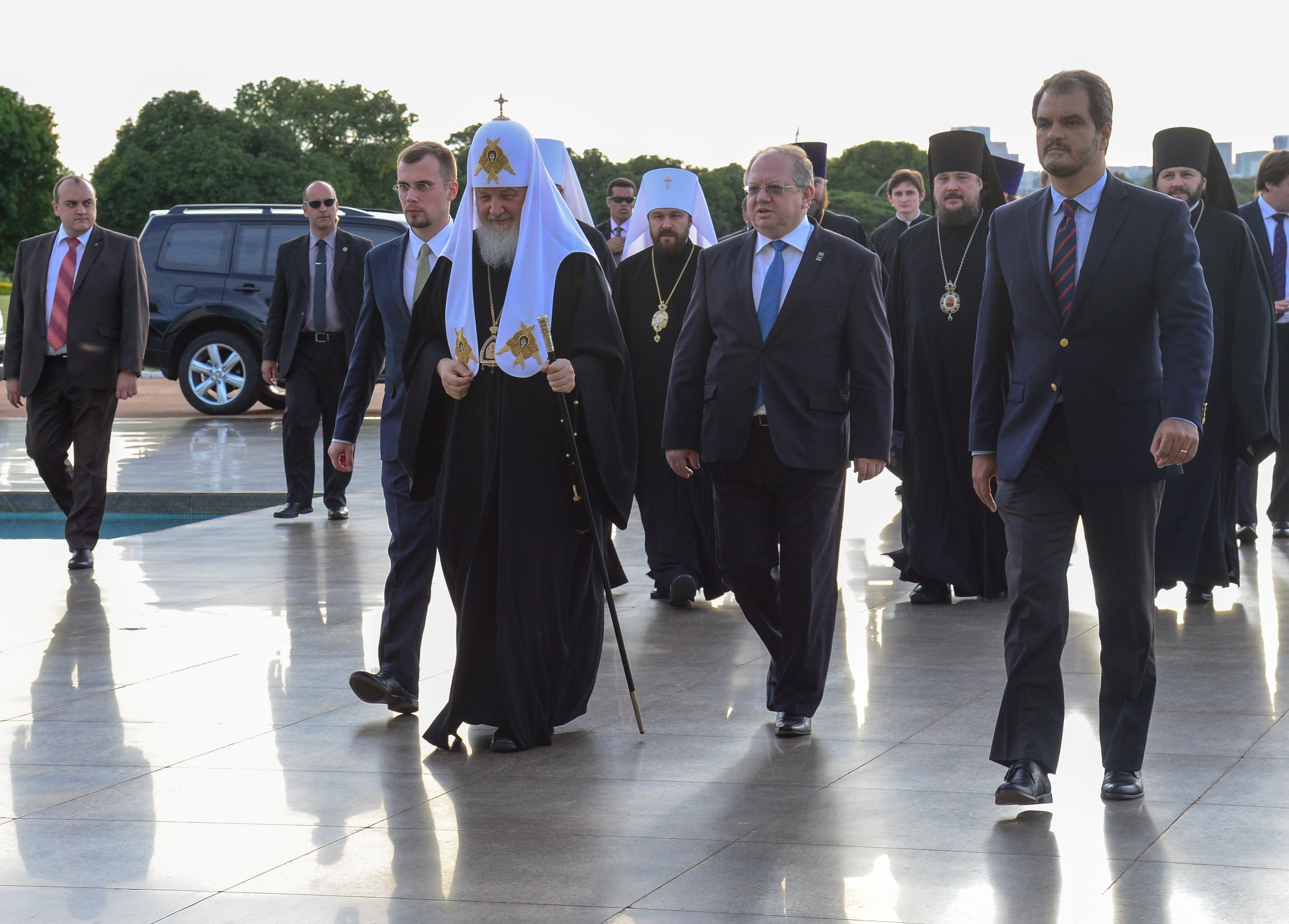
Russian Orthodox Church of Brazil visiting Brasília.

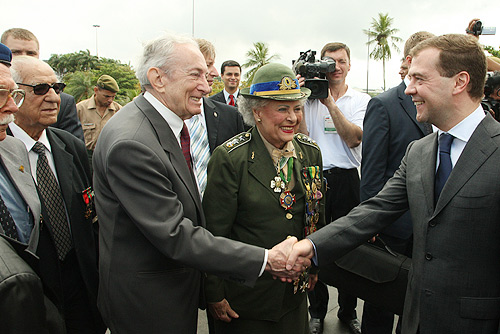
Russian Dmitry Medvedev in Rio de Janeiro.

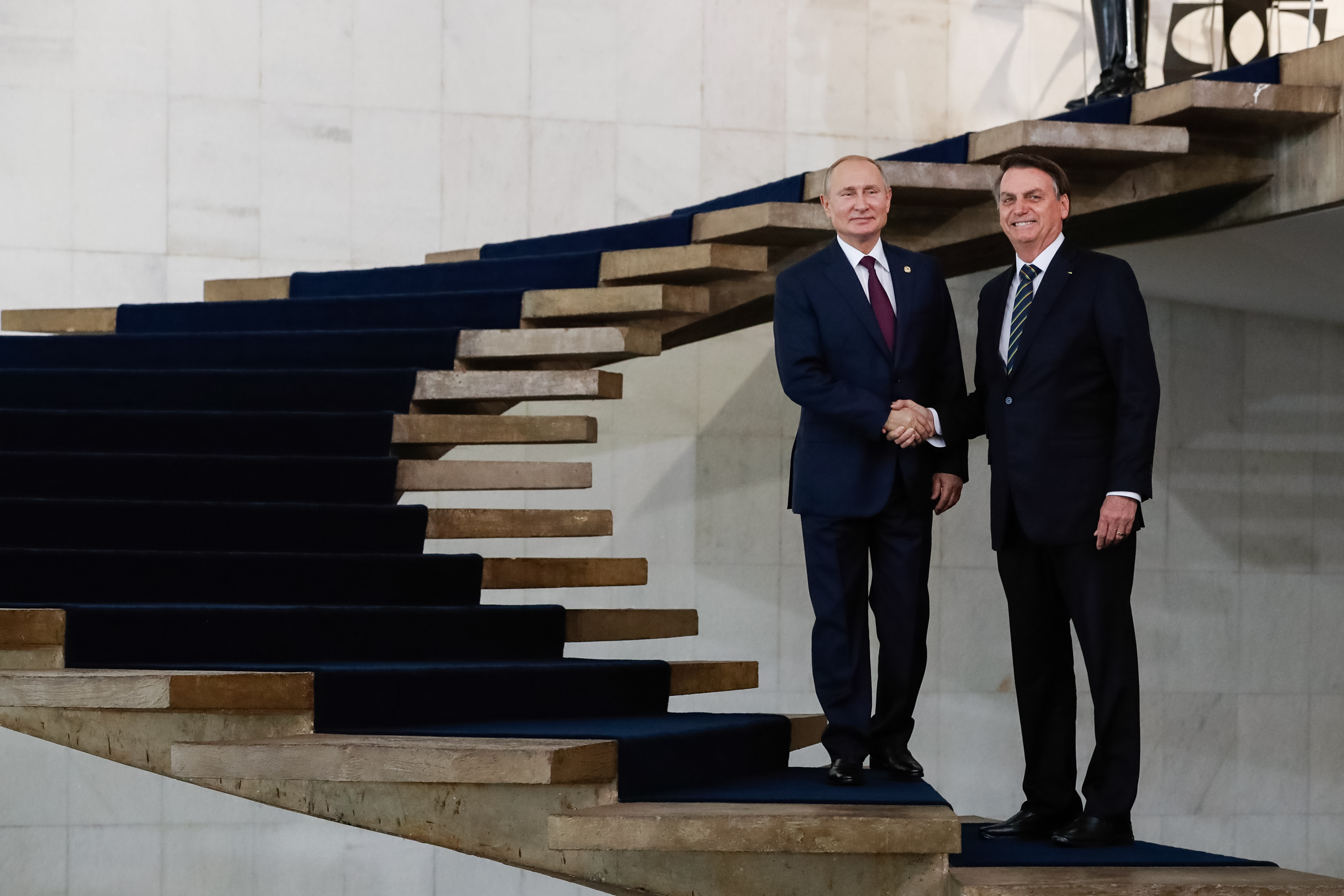
Russian Vladimir Putin and Jair Bolsonaro in Brasília during the BRICS meeting.

Paraná is a state that received a significant number of Russian immigrants. Cities such as Curitiba, Ponta Grossa and Londrina registered the presence of Russian families who immigrated to Brazil. The Campos Gerais region of Paraná was covered by three main nuclei of Russian-German colonies on the Volga. In Ponta Grossa “Otávia”, in Palmeira “Sinimbú” and in Lapa the colonies of “Marienthal”, “Johannesdorf” and “Virmond”.

Between 1877 and 1878, 2381 German-Russians arrived in Ponta Grossa and settled in the Octávio Colony, subdivided into 17 rural areas, far from the urban center. At the same time, Colônia Sinimbú de Palmeira received 240 families from Volga Germans, 471 Catholics and 291 Protestants. The families were divided into Catholic and Protestant groups such as: Pugas, Lago, Santa Quitéria, Alegrete, Papagaios Novos and Quero-Quero.

Immigrant families from Russia arrived in Curitiba in 1912 and joined other Slavic and Germanic communities. In 1958, the Ponta Grossa region received about 100 people fleeing the Russian Revolution and founded the Santa Cruz Colony. The community still preserves the Orthodox culture, calendar, language and religion. It is common in the community to use typical clothes in everyday life, where women wear long dresses. Married women wear a headscarf and single women wear braided hair. Men, on the other hand, grow beards and adopt white shirts, long pants and a rope belt tied around their waists.

The first Russians who arrived in the state of São Paulo disembarked at the port of Santos in 1905 and headed inland. The families founded a colony at Fazenda Pombal, in the municipality of Nova Odessa. The initiative was encouraged by the government, as well as by the Secretary of Agriculture, under the command of Carlos Botelho, who from 1904 onwards implemented a policy of creating colonial nuclei in the interior of the state. From 1905 onwards, the colony of Nova Odessa began to receive new groups of Russian immigrants, in addition to Ukrainians and Latvians, accounting for about 300 people. Later, many who arrived in the agricultural colony and who had no aptitude for agriculture ended up migrating to the cities.

Between 1947 and 1949, about 760 Russians and 808 stateless persons entered the state of São Paulo. Between 1947 and 1958 approximately 1840 Russians entered in São Paulo. Of these, 949 Russian immigrants went to the city of São Paulo. Other cities around São Paulo also received Russian immigrants: São Caetano do Sul 72 immigrants, Osasco 60 immigrants, Santo André 34 immigrants, Guarulhos 15 immigrants, Carapicuíba 12 immigrants, Jundiaí 10 immigrants, Campinas 9 immigrants, Mogi das Cruzes 8 immigrants and Amparo 6 Russians. The majority of Russians of that period did not develop agricultural activities and were absorbed by the labor of the industrial poles of the state.

In the capital of São Paulo, Russian families were concentrated in several neighborhoods of the city, such as: Barra Funda, Indianópolis, Ipiranga, Vila Alpina, Vila Anastácio, Vila Bela, Vila Maria, and Vila Zelina. In Vila Zelina, in the East Zone region, a large community of descendants of immigrants from Eastern European countries was formed, including many Russian families. In the capital, since 1931 there has been the Russian Orthodox Parish of Santíssima Trindade, in Vila Alpina. Several Russian Orthodox churches were built in the region, as in Carapicuíba built in 1949, and in Moema and Indianópolis, built in 1952. The Vila Zelina church was built by the Russian community only in 1962.

Records recorded that between 1909 and 1912, 19,525 Russian immigrants entered Rio Grande do Sul. In 1909, Russian families from the Siberian region arrived in Rio Grande do Sul and settled in the interior of the state. These Russians were farmers and were looking for a region where they could grow food, so they founded a colony in the northwest region, 400 km from Porto Alegre. Subsequently, the region also received German immigrants and the colonies gave rise to the municipality of Campina das Missões, where approximately 1,500 people are descendants of Russian settlers according to information from the year 2018. One of the first Russian Orthodox churches in Brazil was built in the colony of Campina das Missões in 1912, which, along with religiosity, also maintains the language, being taught to children.

In the 1970s, a group of approximately 350 families of Russian Old Believers left Colônia Santa Cruz, in Ponta Grossa, and founded Colônia Russa, in the municipality of Poxoréu. Years later, the colony area was dismembered along with the district giving rise to the municipality of Primavera do Leste, in the state of Mato Grosso. The settlers occupied the region as they were motivated by the colonization incentive and the feasibility of acquiring land at affordable prices. The area of the colony is estimated at 60 thousand hectares. Initially, they developed family farming and later joined agribusiness, cultivating soybeans, as well as beans, corn, cotton and sunflower. Some families also dedicate themselves to livestock. In the 2010s, the community consisted of approximately 120 families. Many families also remigrated to other regions of Brazil.

== See also ==
- Brazil–Russia relations
- Chinese Brazilians
- Immigration to Brazil
- White Brazilians
- Russian people
