= Nikolay Gritsenko =

Russian painter

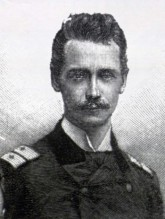
Nikolay Gritsenko (date unknown)

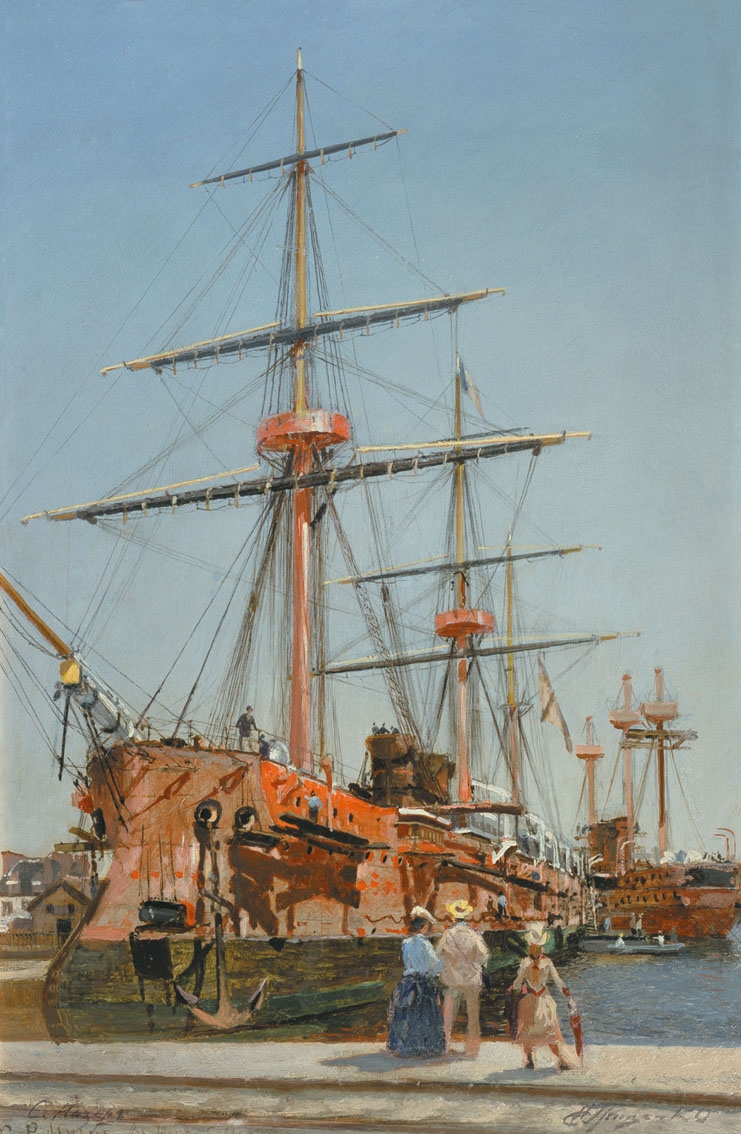
The armored cruiser, Admiral Kornilov at the Saint-Nazaire shipyard

Nikolay Nikolayevich Gritsenko (Russian: Николай Николаевич Гриценко; 8 May 1856 – 8 December 1900) was a Russian painter who specialized in maritime art and seascapes.

== Biography ==
His father was a physician and his mother was a midwife. When he was nineteen, he enrolled at the Kronstadt Technical School, Maritime Department, from which he graduated and was assigned to several vessels, including the cruiser, Vladimir Monomakh. At that time, he was already trying his hand at painting watercolors.

His talent was noted by his superiors and, in 1885, he became a "guest-student" (auditor) at the Imperial Academy of Fine Arts, where he came under the guidance of the maritime artist, Lev Lagorio. In 1887, he was sent to Paris, at government expense, to study with Professor Alexey Bogolyubov. While there, he also attended workshops by Fernand Cormon. He would return to France throughout his career. Although he never had a showing at the Salon, in 1896, he had one at the galleries of Paul Durand-Ruel.

In 1890, he took part in the Eastern journey of Nicholas II, joining his retinue in Trieste. He resigned from the service in 1894, and was appointed an official artist for the Imperial Naval Ministry. He exhibited at the Imperial Academy and with the Peredvizhniki.

He died of tuberculosis while in Menton, France, and is buried in the Russian cemetery there. In 1902, a major exhibition of his paintings was held in St. Petersburg.

His wife, Lyubov Pavlovna Tretyakova (1870-1928), was the daughter of the philanthropist and art collector, Pavel Tretyakov. After his death, she married the artist Léon Bakst.
