= Brazil–Russia relations =

- Brazil: Russia

Diplomatic mission
- Embassy of Brazil, Moscow: Embassy of Russia, Brasília

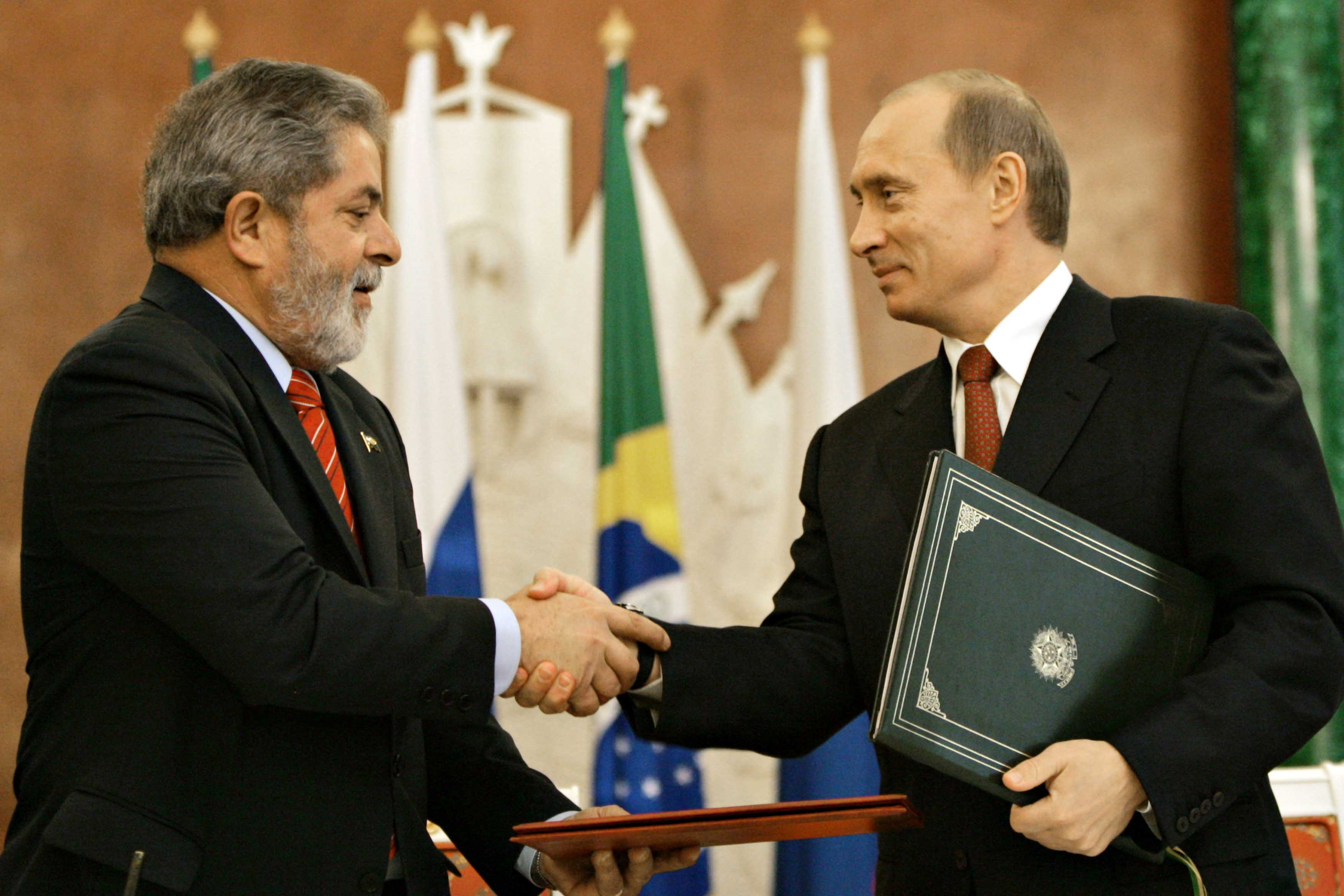
Russian President Vladimir Putin and the President of Brazil Lula in 2005

Brazil–Russia relations have seen significant improvement in recent years, characterized by increased commercial trades and cooperation in military and technology segments. The two countries maintain important partnerships in areas such as space, military technologies, and telecommunications.

According to a 2017 report by the Pew Global Attitudes Project, 35% of Brazilians have a favorable view of Russia, while 36% expressed an unfavorable view.

Both Brazil and Russia are members of BRICS, a group of major emerging economies which prior to 1 January 2024 included Brazil, Russia, India, China, and South Africa. After 1 January it now also includes Egypt, Ethiopia, Iran and the United Arab Emirates, and from 6 January 2025 Indonesia as well.

== History ==
Diplomatic relations between Brazil and Russia were initiated on 3 October 1828, making Brazil the first South American and first Latin American country with formalized tied to Russia. In 1876, the Emperor of Brazil, Dom Pedro II, paid a private visit to Russia.

The diplomatic relations were interrupted twice: in 1917, after the October Revolution (being re-established on 2 April 1945), and in 1947 due to the right-wing government of the Field Marshal Eurico Gaspar Dutra (re-established in 1961, during the government of Jânio Quadros).

Brazil maintained a neutral but distant relationship with the Soviet Union during the Cold War. Their bilateral relations were limited to commercial trade and cooperation agreements of minimal importance. In 1988, José Sarney made the first official visit of a Brazilian Head of State to the USSR.

With the fall of the Soviet Union and the subsequent birth of the Russian Federation, talks between the two nations increased. Brazil was one of the first countries to recognize the Russian Federation as the legal successor of the Soviet Union (26 December 1991). In 1994, Celso Amorim made the first official visit of a Brazilian Foreign Minister to Russia.

Since then, bilateral relations between Russia and Brazil have been characterized by the positive dynamics of political contacts at all levels. In 1997 the Russian-Brazilian Commission of High Level of Cooperation (CAN) was created, headed by the Head of Government of the Russian Federation and the Vice-President of the Federative Republic of Brazil and regulated by the Brazil-Russia Cooperation Treaty, signed on 21 November 1997. Its operational mechanism is the Intergovernmental Cooperation Commission (CIC).

In June 2000, the two countries signed the Basic Agreement on partnership relations. In 2001, a high-level committee headed by then Vice-President of Brazil Marco Maciel, and then Prime minister of Russia Mikhail Kasyanov, established several long-term bilateral treaties, initiating a strategic partnership between the two countries, and creating the Brazilian-Russian Governmental Commission. In 2002, President Fernando Henrique Cardoso made an official visit to Russia when the "Strategic Partnership" between the two countries was celebrated. The following year, the Minister of Foreign Affairs Igor Ivanov visited Brazil.

Continuing that path, another Vice-President of Brazil, José Alencar, travelled to Moscow in September 2003 to meet with Russian President Vladimir Putin and his senior cabinet members. The two countries signed the Brazil-Russia Military Technology and Transfer Pact, an important agreement in the area of space technology, missile defence, and military weapons transfer.

In response to an invitation made by then Brazilian President Luiz Inácio Lula da Silva, Vladimir Putin made a state visit to Brazil on 22 November 2004, being the first visit of a Russian President in the history of bilateral relations, when the "Technological Alliance" was celebrated between the two countries. On 18 October 2005, during a state visit of President Lula to Moscow, the two heads of state signed the bilateral Brazil-Russia Strategic Alliance, as well as an agreement that made it possible for the Brazilian Space Agency to send the first Brazilian astronaut, Marcos Pontes, into space aboard Soyuz TMA-8.

In 2006, Russian Foreign Minister Sergei Lavrov visited Brazil, when the Memorandum of Understanding for the Establishment of a Mechanism for Political Dialogue and Cooperation between Mercosur and the Russian Federation was signed. On 26 November 2008, during a state visit of then President Dmitry Medvedev to Brazil, the two countries signed agreements on visa exemption, and cooperation in the aerospace, nuclear and defence industries.

The second BRIC summit was held in Brasília, following the first in Russia.

In 2012 President Dilma Rousseff visited Russia. The following year, 185 years were completed since the establishment of diplomatic relations between Russia and Brazil. On this occasion the Russian Foreign Minister and his Brazilian counterpart exchanged messages of congratulations, emphasizing coincidence of positions in the international arena and importance of future development of cooperation. Both countries advocate observance of human rights, democratic values, respect for national sovereignty, primacy of international law, reform of institutes of global economic and financial governance, and consolidation of the central role of the United Nations Security Council.

In 2014 the President of Russia, Vladimir Putin, visited Brazil to participate in the VI BRICS Summit. The following year the Brazilian President, Dilma Rousseff, participated in the VII BRICS Summit in Ufá.

In 2017 the President of Brazil, Michel Temer, paid a visit to Russia. A series of acts were signed, including:

- Joint Declaration of the Federative Republic of Brazil and the Russian Federation on Strategic Dialogue for Foreign Policy;
- Political Consultation Plan Between the Brazilian Ministry of Foreign Affairs and the Russian Ministry of Foreign Affairs for 2018–2021;
- Memorandum of Understanding Between the Brazilian Ministry of Foreign Affairs and the Russian Ministry of Economic Development in the Area of Economic and Investment Cooperation;
- Protocol Between the Brazilian Ministry of Development, Industry and Foreign Trade and the Russian Federal Customs Service on Cooperation, Information, Exchanges and Mutual Assistance about the Uniform System of Tariff Preferences of the Eurasian Economic Union;
- Memorandum of Understanding between the Brazilian Federal Revenue Secretariat, the Brazilian Ministry of Finance, and the Russian Federal Customs Service on the Exchange of Information on Goods and Vehicles Circulating between the Federative Republic of Brazil and the Russian Federation.

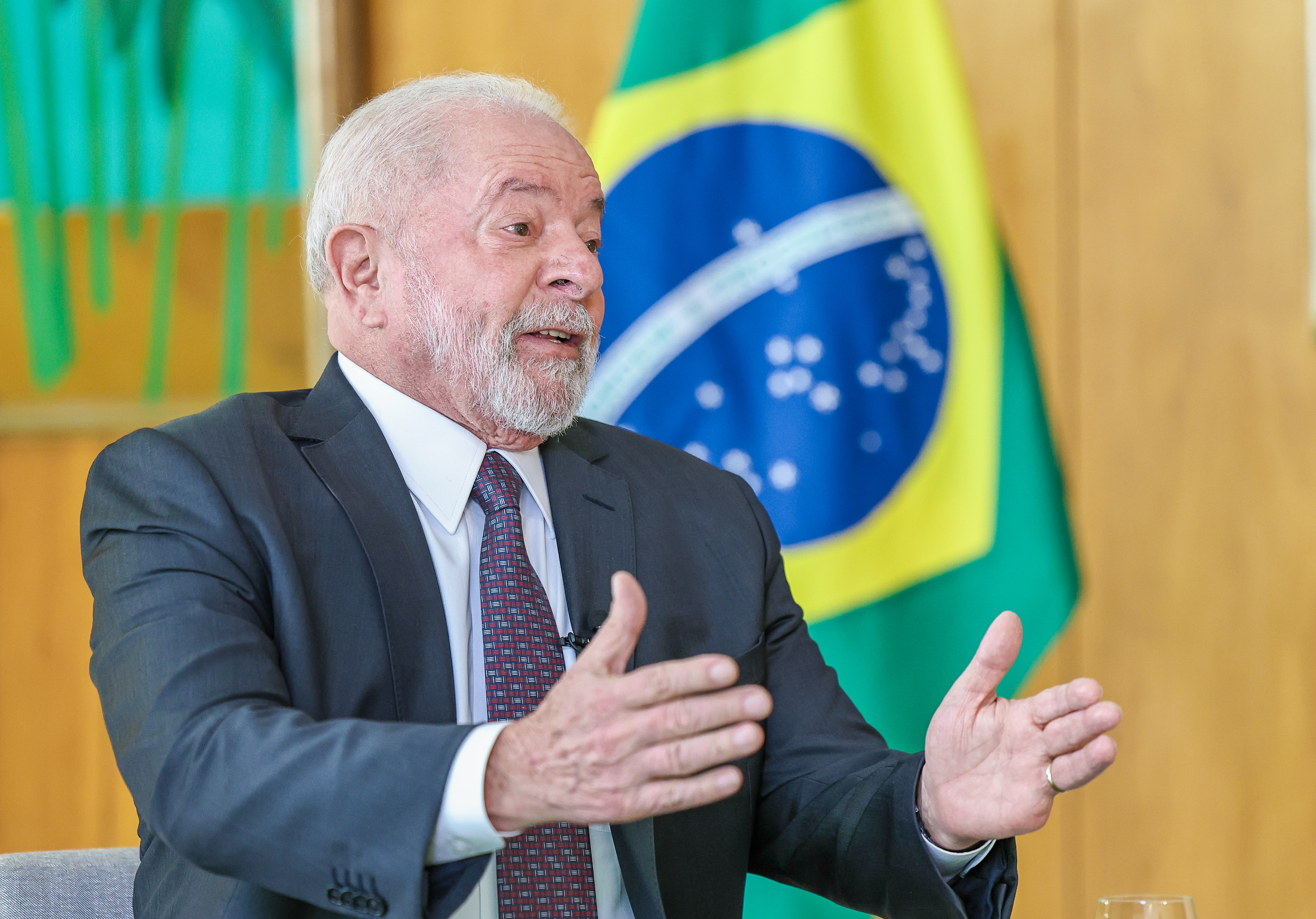
In April 2023, Brazilian President Luiz Inácio Lula da Silva condemned Russia's violation of Ukraine's territorial integrity and said Russia should withdraw from Ukrainian territory it has occupied since February 2022.

In February 2022, Brazilian President Jair Bolsonaro visited Russia. He met Russian President Vladimir Putin. At the centre of the talks, the economic alliance between the two countries since Russia is a major purchaser of Brazilian beef, while Russia supplies significant amounts of potash fertilizer to the Brazilian nation. According to the Moscow State Institute of International Relations, Brazil has been identified as a strategic partner in Latin America, which includes military cooperation. Both President Bolsonaro and aspiring president Lula da Silva sought close relations with Russia on all levels of government. Bolsonaro stated that Brazil was in “solidarity” with Russia. The Russian Federation likewise emphasized the 'pragmatic approach' of bilateral relations that put ideological differences aside.

In February 2022, Brazil voted in favor of a draft United Nations Security Council resolution condemning Russia's invasion of Ukraine. However, Bolsonaro declined to condemn Russian's invasion of Ukraine. Bolsonaro stated, "Brazil will not take sides." In July 2022, Bolsonaro opposed sanctions on Russia following the 2022 Russian invasion of Ukraine and stated that Russia backed Brazil's position on the sovereignty of the Amazon.

== Current relations ==
In recent years, the relationship between the countries has been widened through visits by senior officials, multilateral dialogue (UN, G-20, BRICS), and increased trade and cooperation, especially in aerospace and technical-military matters.

The two countries are committed to achieving US$10 billion in trade. In 2012, the bilateral exchange registered almost US$6 billion. The number of Brazilian companies installed in Russia has grown significantly. Cooperation in sanitary and phytosanitary matters has advanced, benefiting the trade of meat as Russia is one of the largest importers of beef and pork produced in Brazil.

Brazil and Russia have converging positions on many issues on the international agenda, sharing the conviction that it is necessary to reform the structures of global governance, with a view to building an institutional architecture more consistent with the contemporary world.

The consolidation of the BRICS grouping is one of the axes of relations between Brazil and Russia. Initially seen as a purely economic concept, BRICS presents itself today as a platform for political coordination in proposing solutions to international challenges. Both countries are committed to advancing two BRICS cooperation projects - the New Development Bank and the Contingent Reserve Arrangement.

Cultural cooperation is also a sizeable aspect of the bilateral relationship. Since 2008, annual editions of the Brazilian Film Festival have been held in Russia. Russia has contributed to the training of Brazilian dancers, within the framework of the partnership created when the Bolshoi Ballet School branch opened in the city of Joinville (2001). The prospect of expanding the network of Portuguese and Russian languages in the main Russian and Brazilian universities demonstrates the growing mutual interest of students.

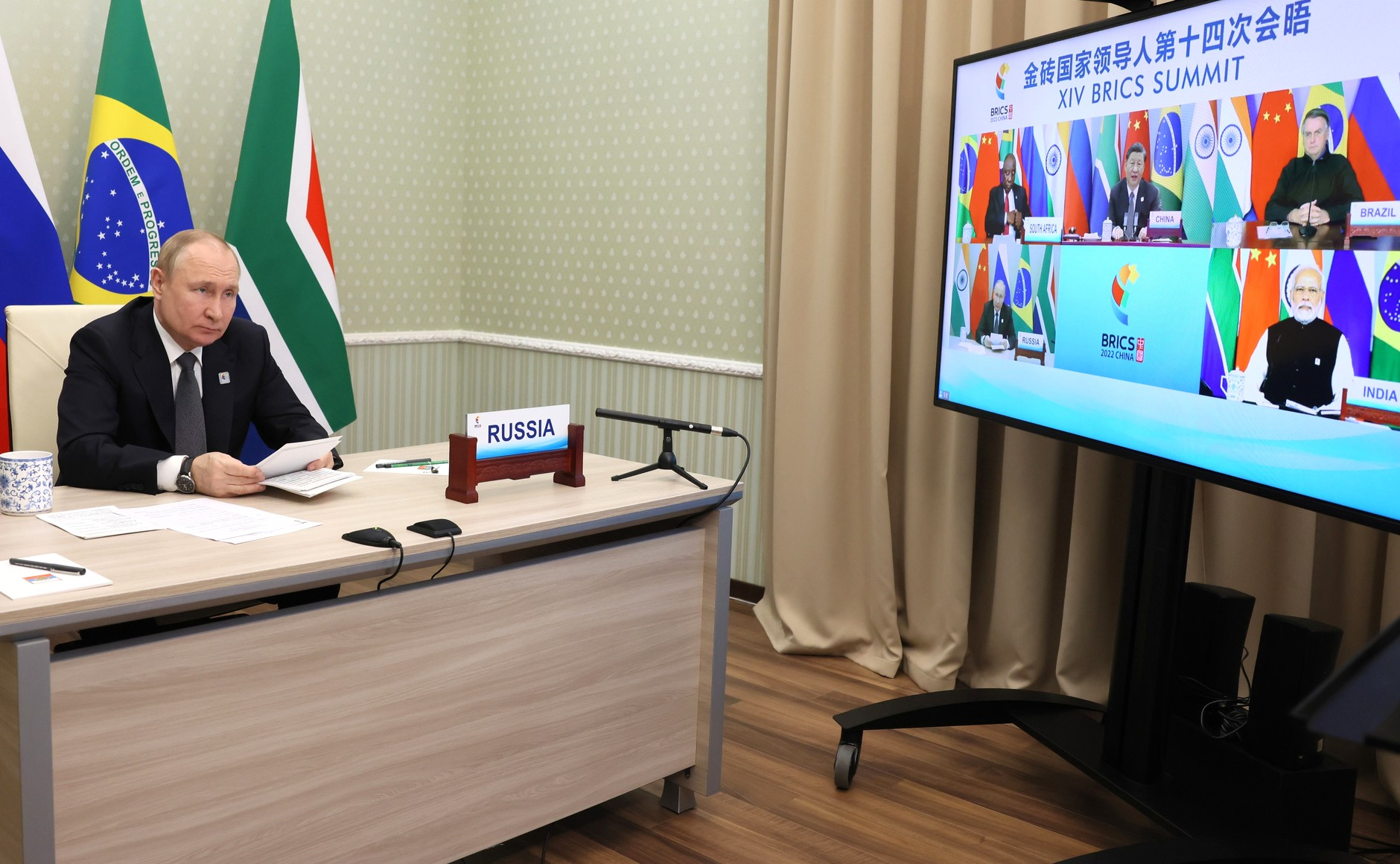
Russian President Vladimir Putin and Brazilian president Jair Bolsonaro at the virtual 14th BRICS summit on 23 June 2022. Brazil and Russia are members of BRICS.

Brazil has an embassy in Moscow and Russia has an embassy in Brasilia.

In May 2022, Lula placed blame on Ukrainian president Volodymyr Zelenskyy for Russia's invasion of Ukraine, saying "This guy is as responsible as Putin for the war". Lula also repeatedly attacked NATO and the European Union as having caused the war. He accused NATO of "claiming for itself the right to install military bases in the vicinity of another country".

After Germany appealed to Lula to provide military aid to Ukraine by selling it arms, Lula refused.

In March 2023, Brazilian Foreign Minister Mauro Vieira said Putin would face the risk of arrest if he entered Brazil.

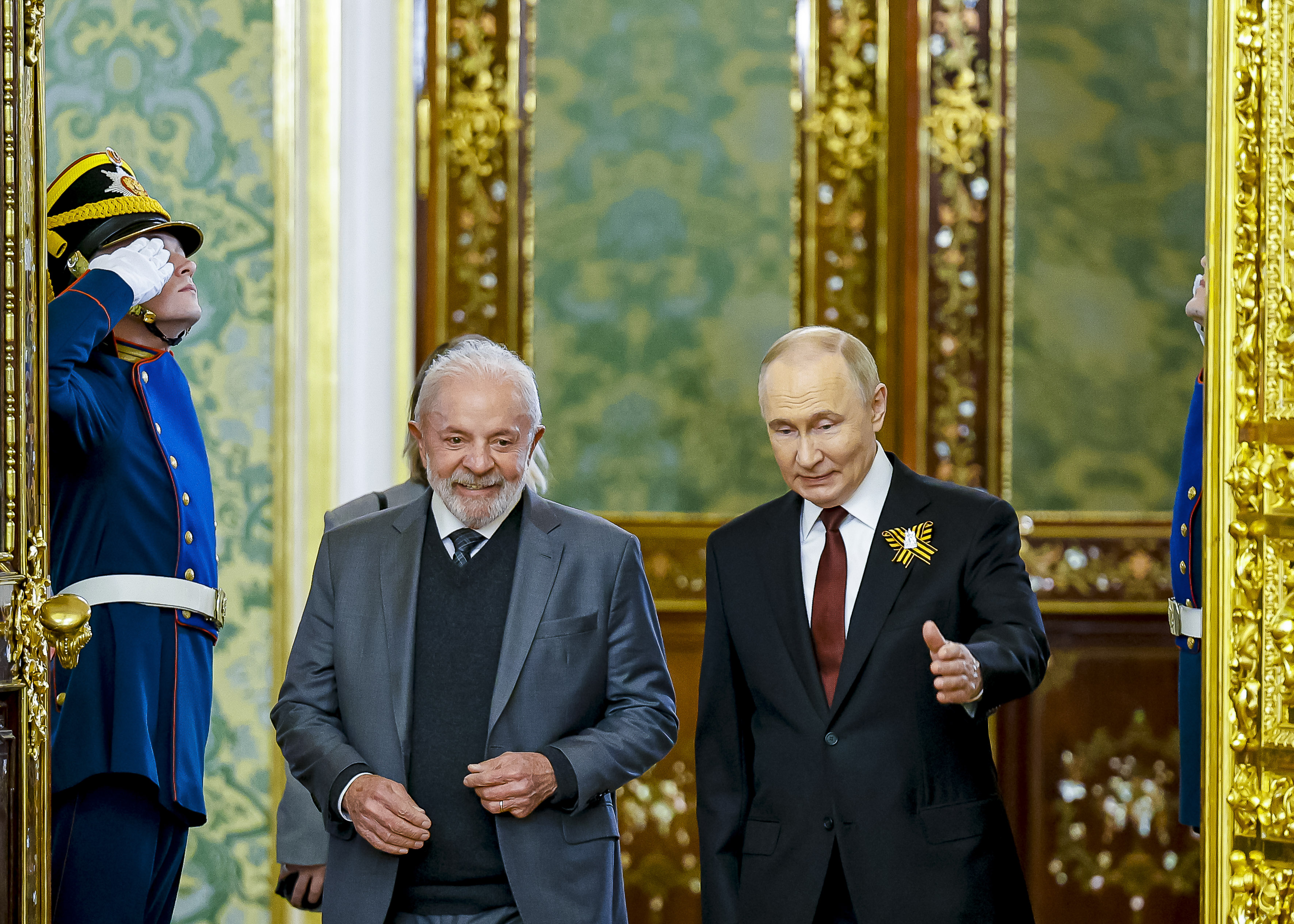
Brazilian President Lula da Silva with Russian President Vladimir Putin during the Victory Day celebrations in Moscow on 9 May 2025

In April 2023, Brazil President Luiz Inácio Lula da Silva initially condemned Russia's violation of Ukraine's territorial integrity and said Russia should withdraw from Ukrainian territory it has occupied since February 2022. He said Brazil advocates a "negotiated political solution to the conflict" and expressed "concern" about the "global consequences" of the war "in terms of food and energy security, especially in the poorest regions of the planet." Lula later suggested however that Ukraine could "give up Crimea" in exchange for peace and Russia's withdrawal from the Ukrainian territory it occupied after February 2022.

In December 2023, Lula said he would invite Vladimir Putin to the BRICS and G20 summits in Brazil. Due to Brazil being a signatory of the Rome Statute of the International Criminal Court, Putin could be placed under arrest by the Brazilian authorities if he sets foot on Brazil's territory. Lula said Putin could be arrested in Brazil, but that would be the decision of Brazil's independent courts, not his government. In February 2024, he was visited by Russian Foreign Minister Sergey Lavrov. In May 2025, Lula attended the Victory Day parade in Moscow.

Since the Russian invasion of Ukraine, Brazil has tripled its trade with Russia. Brazil has become one of the largest buyers of Russian diesel and fertilizers. In 2023, Brazil imported Russian fertilizers worth $3.5 billion.

== Common membership in international organizations ==
BIS • BRICS • IAEA • IBRD • ICAO • ICRM • IDA • IFC • IFRCS • IHO • ILO • IMF • IMO • Inmarsat • Intelsat • Interpol • IOC • IOM • ISO • ITU • LAIA • NSG • PCA • UN • UNCTAD • UNESCO • UNHCR • UNIDO • UNITAR • UNTAET • UNWTO • UPU • WCO • WHO • WIPO • WMO

== Resident diplomatic Missions ==
of Brazil in Russia

- Moscow (Embassy)

of Russia in Brazil

- Brasília (Embassy)
- Rio de Janeiro (Consulate-General)
- São Paulo (Consulate-General)

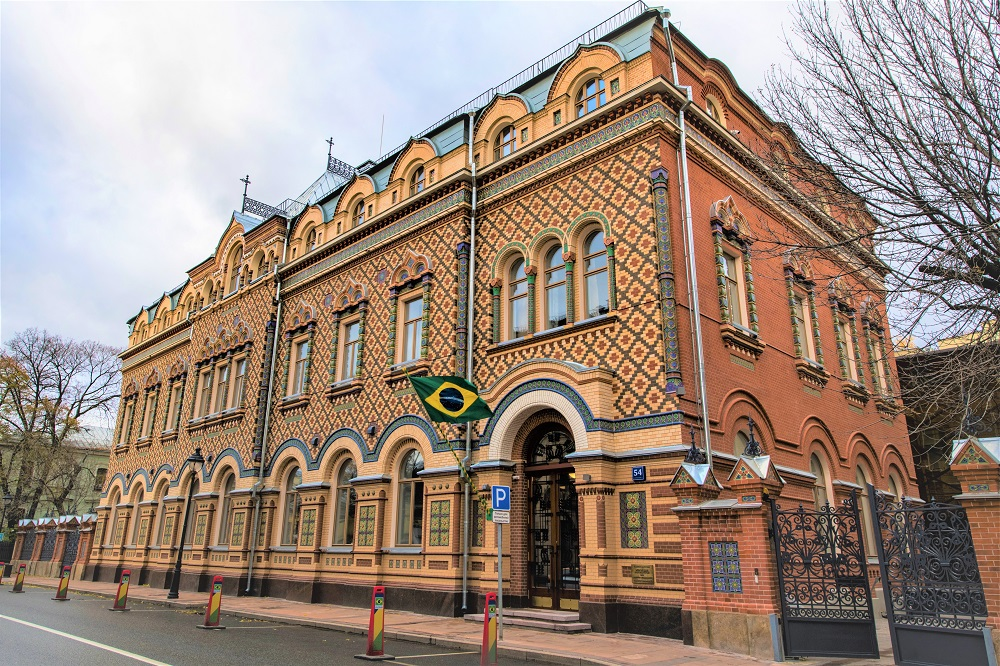
Embassy of Brazil in Moscow

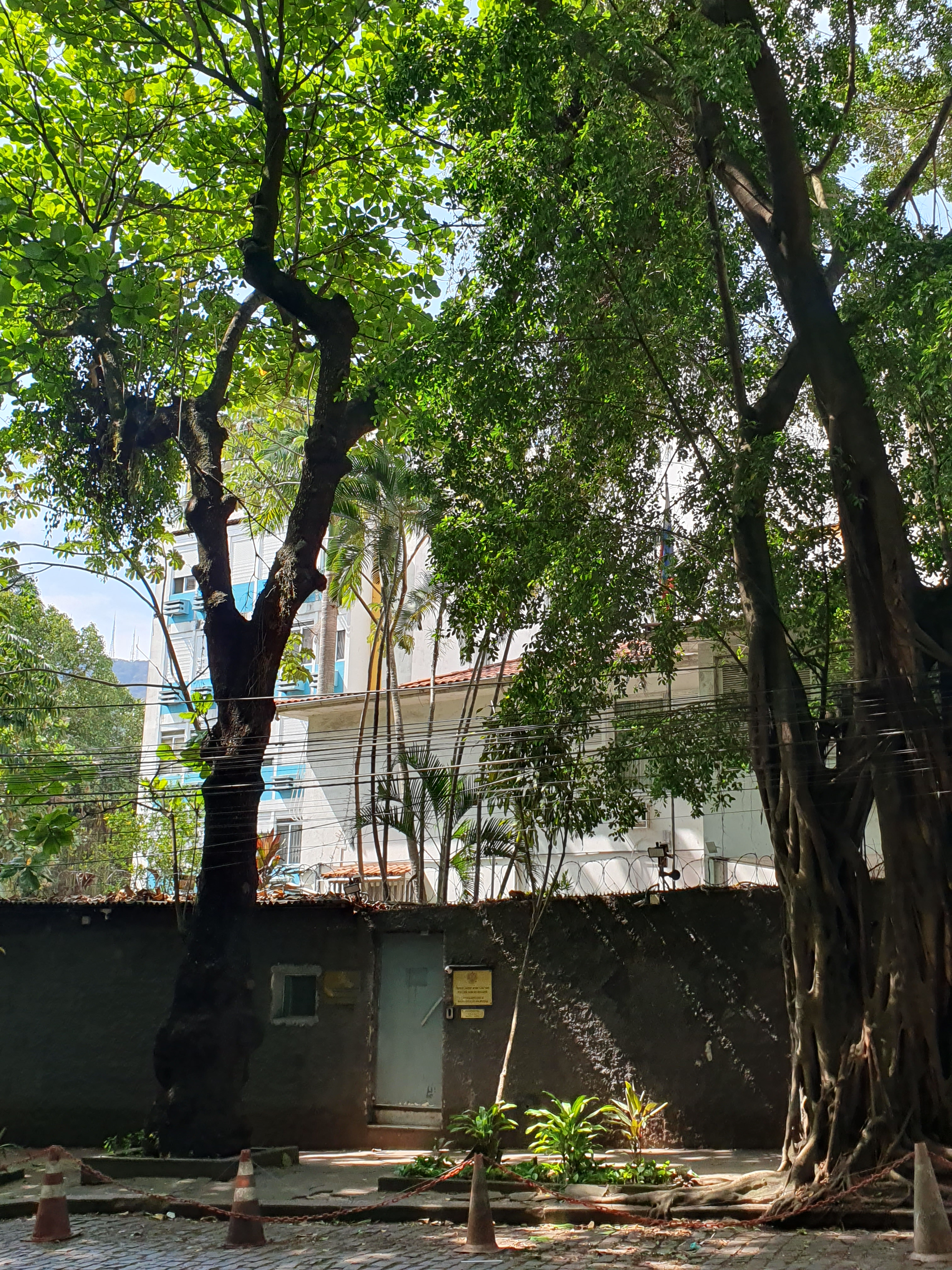
Consulate-General of Russia in Rio de Janeiro

== See also ==
- Foreign relations of Brazil
- Foreign relations of Russia
- Russian Brazilians
