= Ilya Bondarenko =

Russian-Soviet architect, historian and preservationist

Ilya Yevgrafovich Bondarenko
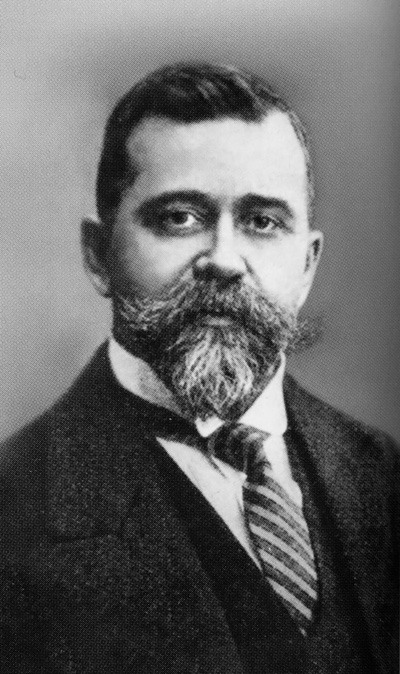
- Born: July 18, 1870; Ufa
- Died: July 21, 1947 (aged 77); Moscow
- Occupation: Architect
- Practice: Own firm
- Buildings: Northern Revival churches of Old Believers, 1906-1911

Ilya Yevgrafovich Bondarenko (Russian: Илья Евграфович Бондаренко; 1867–1947) was a Russian-Soviet architect, historian and preservationist, notable for developing a particular style of Old Believers architecture in 1905-1917, blending Northern Russian revival with Art Nouveau.

== Education and early works ==
Bondarenko trained at Moscow School of Painting, Sculpture and Architecture from 1887 to 1891 (class of Alexander Kaminsky), completing education at the Zurich Polytechnikum in 1894 and Fyodor Schechtel firm (1895–1896). He travelled within Russia throughout the 1890s, studying traditional architecture of the North and Volga regions.

He was associated with Savva Mamontov-sponsored group of artists and Abramtsevo Colony; these connections helped him secure his first major project - Russian Crafts pavilions at the Exposition Universelle (1900) in Paris, in partnership with Konstantin Korovin. Later, Bondarenko would rely on Abramtsevo ceramics in most of his works. He was well skilled in Art Nouveau interior design, taking part in Ivan Fomin's 1902 Art Nouveau exhibition. His style, influenced by Victor Vasnetsov and contemporary work of Sergey Solovyov, is a direct development of Abramtsevo school, yet with unique touch of austere Old Believers traditions and a deep first-hand knowledge of Pskov and Novgorod relics.

== Old Believers churches ==
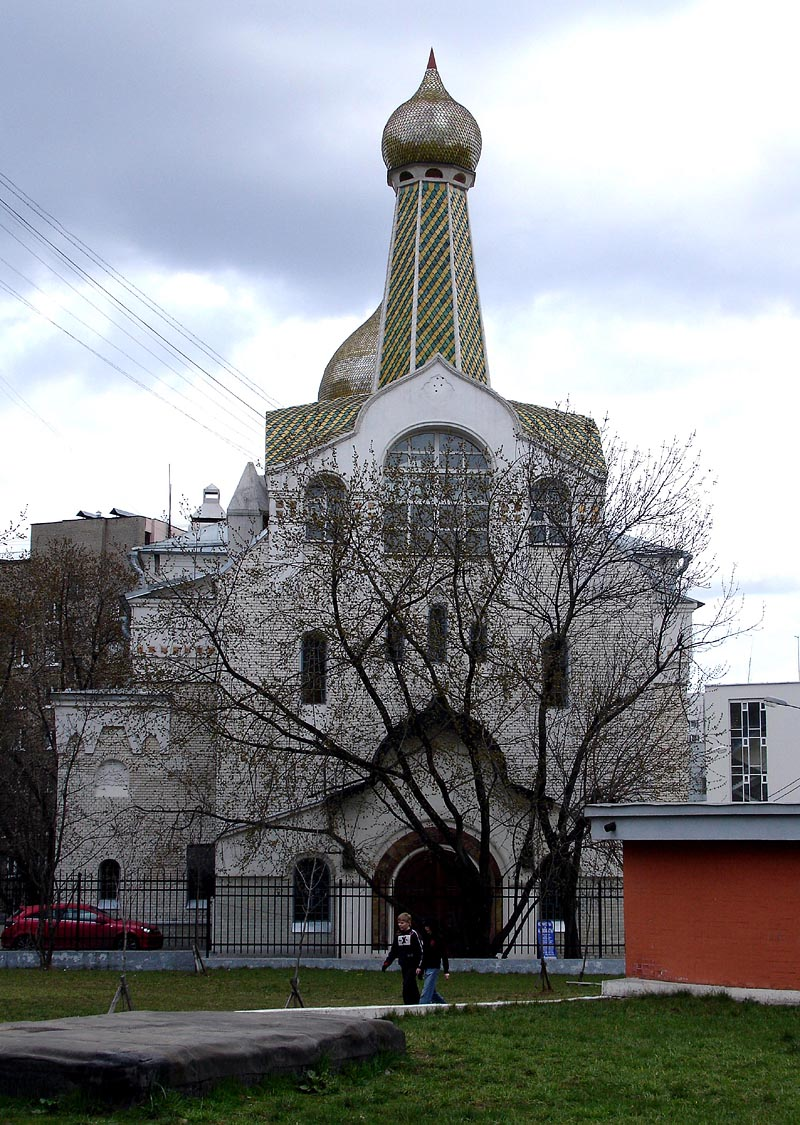
Church in Moscow, still missing the crosses – used as karate training gym

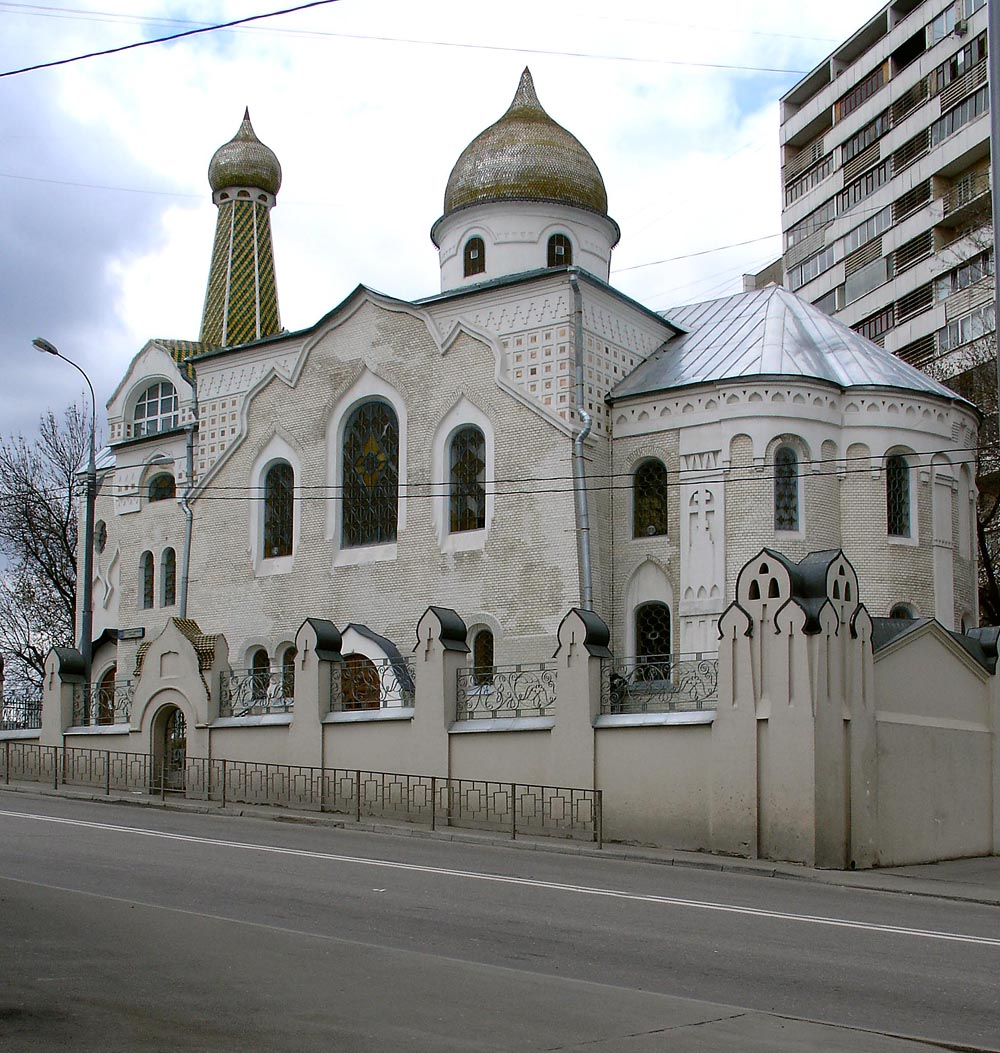
Old Believers' Church of Intercession of Theotokos, Gavrikov Lane, Moscow, 1906-1911

During the Russian Revolution of 1905, the government lifted earlier bans off Old Believers, allowing them, at last, to build their own churches (before April, 1905, worship was limited to a few historical places like Rogozhskoye Cemetery). Congregations responded with numerous new construction projects. Bondarenko, well-known to influential community leaders, became the foremost architect for Belokrinitskaya Hierarchy. In 1907-1908 he built the first new Old Believers church in Moscow, in Tokmakov Lane (for the Pomorian Old-Orthodox Church). This was followed by churches in Noginsk, Riga, Kashin, Orekhovo-Zuevo, three more churches in Moscow. He also worked for the State Church, completing the Shuya Cathedral in 1912.

== Preservation efforts ==
Bondarenko adored the Moscow variety of Neoclassicism, and was engaged in studies of this style since 1904. In particular, he discovered and published the original drawings of Domenico Giliardi and Afanasy Grigoriev (1913), and wrote the first biography of Matvey Kazakov (1912).

After the Russian Revolution of 1917 Bondarenko, despite his affiliation with the church, found a place in the Soviet system – first as the museum manager in Ufa (1919–1921), where he set up the first theater and the first museum (present-day Mikhail Nesterov Museum; Nesterov and Bondarenko were close friends). In 1921, Bondarenko returned to Moscow, and worked in various soviet institutions until his death in 1947. In the 1930s, he returned to architecture, working with historical buildings, notably his 1938 expansion of Bakhrushin Museum of Theatre and 1933 expansion of Moscow Conservatory. He held title of chief architect of Vagankovo Cemetery, chief architect of Mosenergo, and was engaged in numerous consultancies regarding old buildings, including the 1938-1940 surveys of Saint Basil's Cathedral. His last assignment has been the restoration of Matvey Kazakov's Travel Palace in Tver, damaged during World War II.
