= Pavel Tretyakov =

Russian businessman, patron of art, collector, and philanthropist

- Павел Третьяков
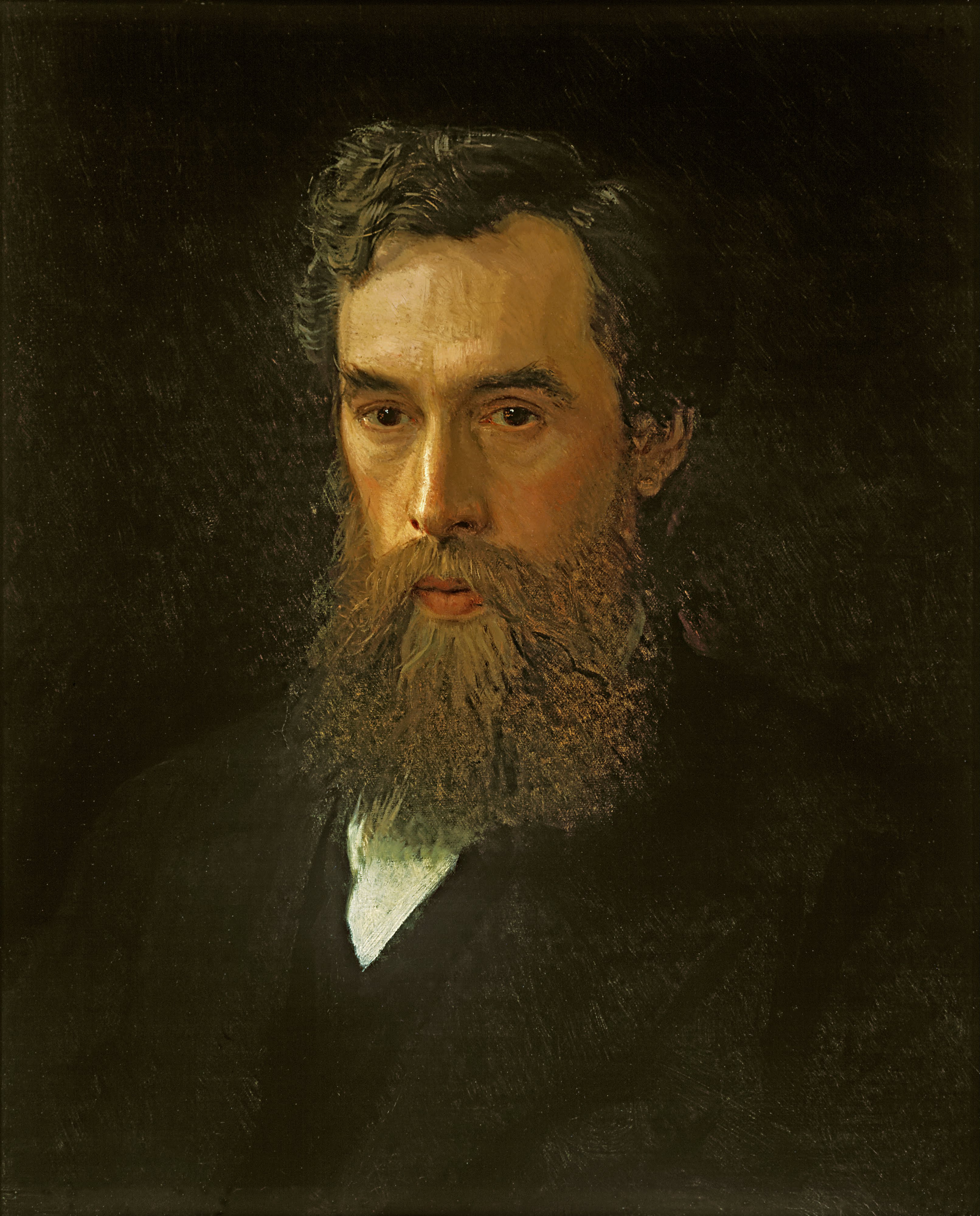
- Ivan Kramskoi, Pavel Tretyakov, 1876, oil on canvas
- Born: 27 December 1832; Moscow, Russian Empire
- Died: 16 December 1898 (aged 65); Moscow, Russian Empire
- Resting place: Novodevichy Cemetery
- Spouse: Vera Tertyakova
- Children: Aleksandra Botkina
- Awards: Medal "In Memory of the Coronation of Emperor Nicholas II"; Medal "In Memory of the War of 1853-1856"; Honorary Citizen of Moscow

Pavel Mikhaylovich Tretyakov (Note: Russian: Павел Михайлович Третьяков, IPA: [ˈpavʲɪɫ mʲɪˈxajləvʲɪtɕ trʲɪtʲjɪˈkof]; In this name that follows East Slavic naming customs, the patronymic is Mikhaylovich and the family name is Tretyakov.) (27 December 1832 – 16 December 1898) was a Russian businessman, patron of art, collector, and philanthropist who gave his name to the Tretyakov Gallery and Tretyakov Drive in Moscow. His brother Sergei Tretyakov was also a famous patron of art and a philanthropist.

== Career in business ==
Together with other Moscow businessmen he acted as the founder of the Moscow Merchant Bank (becoming one of its heads), the Moscow commercial and industrial company, some other large firms. He amassed a considerable fortune (4.4 million rubles), consisting of real estate (5 houses in Moscow), securities, money and bills.

== Collecting art ==
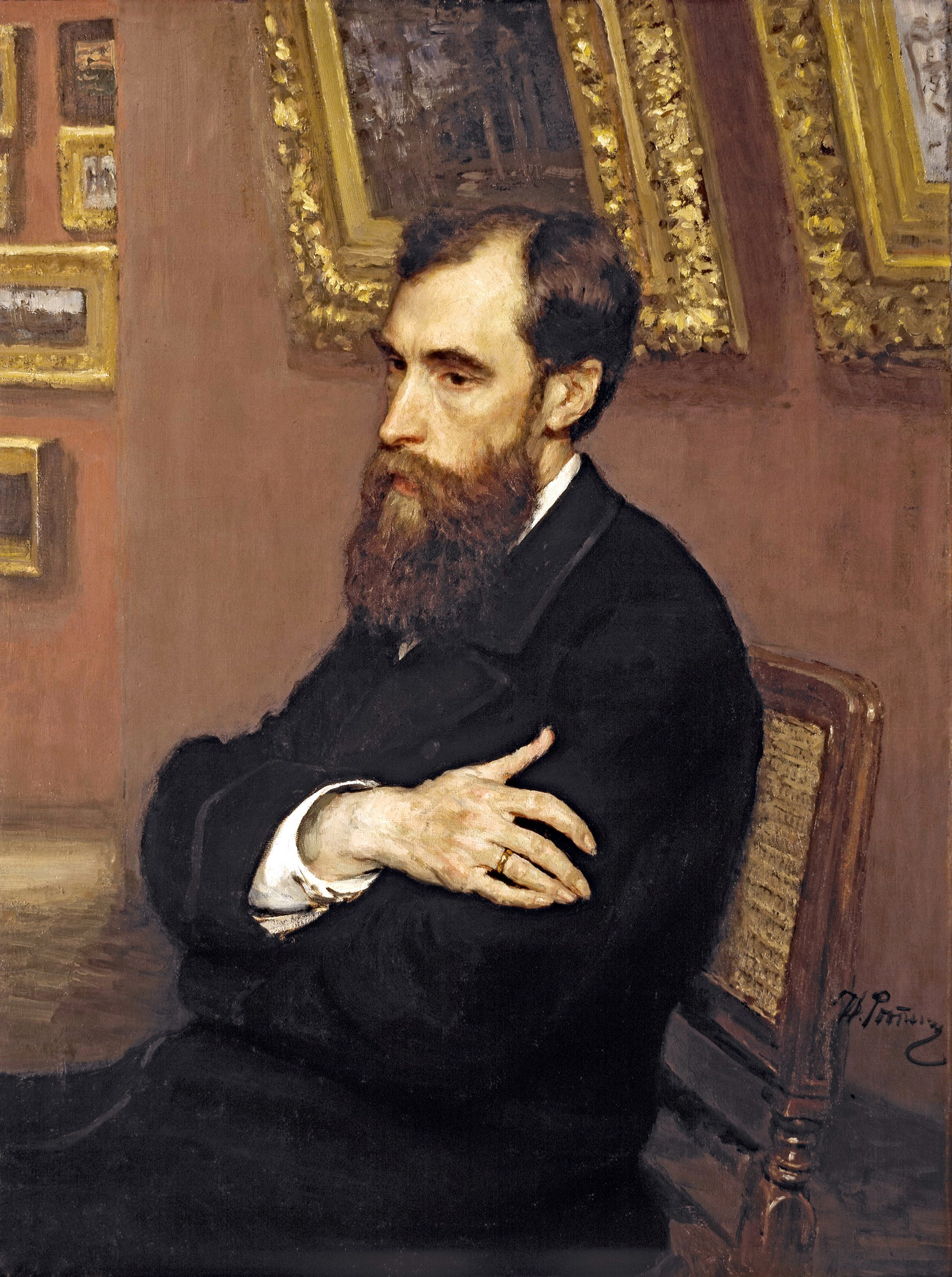
Ilya Repin, Pavel Tretyakov, 1883, oil on canvas

Tretyakov started to collect art in 1854 at the age of 22; his first purchase was 10 canvases by Old Dutch masters. He laid down for himself the aim of creating a Russian National Gallery. In his collection Tretyakov included the most valuable and remarkable products, first of all the contemporaries, from 1870 - mainly members of the society of circulating art exhibitions (Tovarishchestvo peredvizhnyh hudozhestvennyh vystavok or Peredvizhniki, Передвижники in Russian). He bought paintings at exhibitions and directly from artists' studios, sometimes he bought the whole series: in 1874 he acquired V.V. Vereschagin's "Turkestan series" (13 pictures, 133 figures and 81 studies), in 1880 - his "Indian series" (78 studies). In his collection there were over 80 studies by Alexander Ivanov. In 1885 Tretyakov bought 102 studies by V.D. Polenov painted by the artist during journeys across Turkey, Egypt, Syria and Palestine. He also acquired Viktor Vasnetsov's collection of the sketches made during his work on St Volodymyr's Cathedral in Kiev. Tretyakov had the fullest collection of such artists as: V.G. Perov, I.N. Kramskoi, Ilya Repin, Vasily Surikov, I.I. Levitan, and Valentin Serov. Aspiring to show the beginnings and development of the domestic school of art, Tretyakov began to acquire pictures by masters of the 18th and first half of the 19th centuries and landmarks of Old Russian painting. He also conceived the creation of a "Russian pantheon" - a portrait gallery of famous Russians. He commissioned especially for it portraits of figures of domestic culture from leading masters of this genre - N.N. Ge, Kramskoi, N.V. Nevrev, Perov, Repin.

In 1870-80 Tretyakov also began to collect illustrations (471 by 1893), and in 1890 he began to collect icons. During his lifetime they were kept in his study and were not put on public display. He also had a small collection of sculpture (9 sculptures by 1893).

At first the gallery was located in Tretyakov's house in Lavrushenski pereulok. But as his collection expanded he decided to reconstruct his house to accommodate it. In 1870-1880 the house was reconstructed a number of times by the architect Kaminski.

Tretyakov wanted to transfer the gallery to the city as discreetly as possible, without any fuss; he didn't want to be in the centre of general attention and an object of gratitude. But this was not possible and he was very dissatisfied.

From 1881 his gallery became popular (by 1885 it was visited by about 30 thousand people). In 1892 Tretyakov inherited a collection of Western European painting from his brother and placed it in two halls of the western school. The collection in Tretyakov's gallery was equal in importance with the largest museums in Russia at that time, and became one of sights of Moscow. In August 1892 Tretyakov donated his collection and a private residence to Moscow. By then in the collection there were 1287 pictures and 518 graphics of the Russian school, 75 pictures and 8 figures of the West-European school, 15 sculptures and a collections of icons.

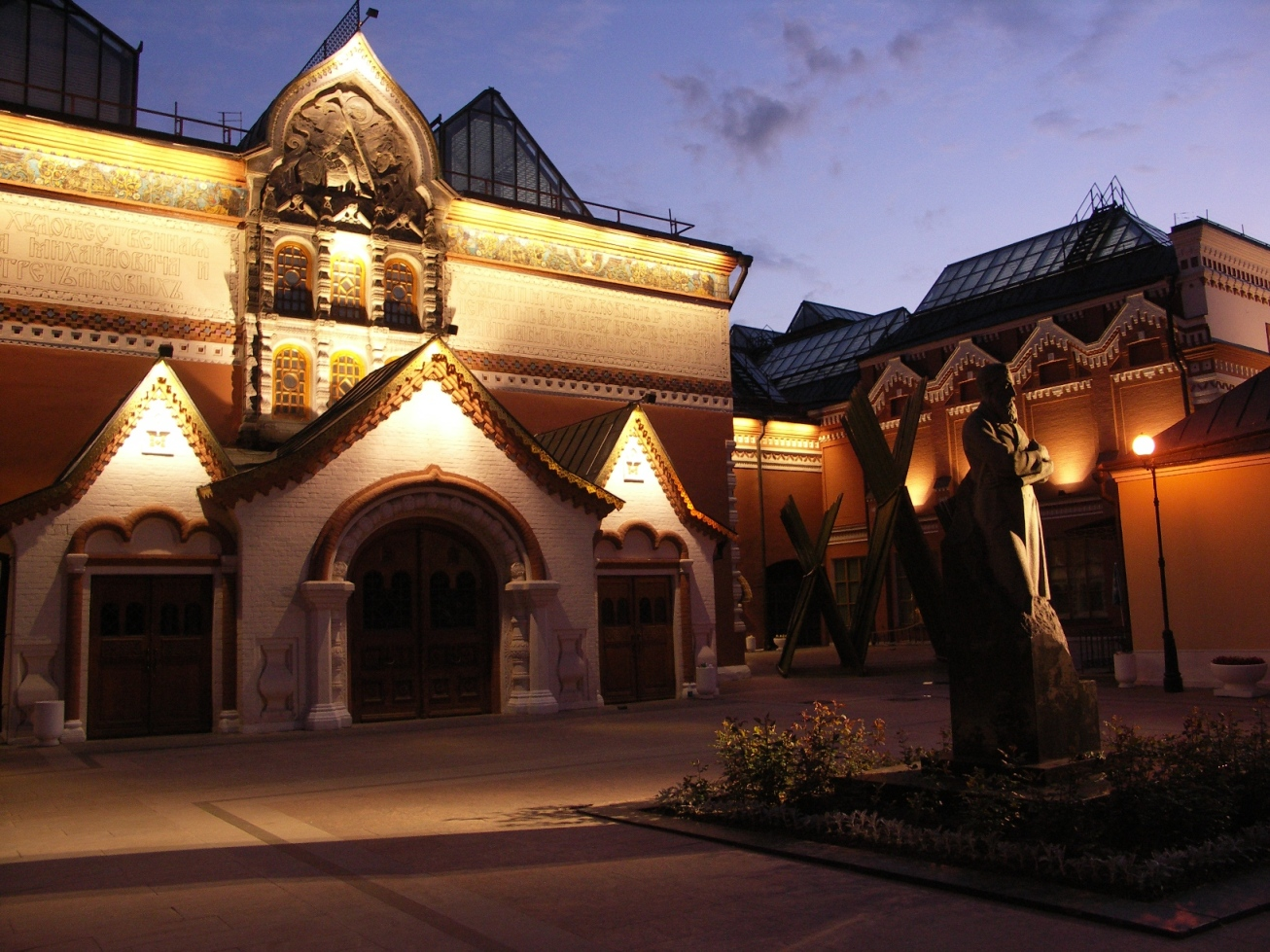
The Tretyakov Gallery with a statue of Tretyakov in front of it.

On 15 August 1893 the official opening of a museum under the name "Pavel and Sergey Tretyakov City art gallery" (nowadays Tretyakov Gallery) took place. By 1890 it was visited by up to 150 thousand people annually. Tretyakov continued to build up his collection, for example, in 1894 he donated a gallery of 30 pictures, 12 figures and a marble statue "The Christian martyrs" works by Mark Antokolski. He was also involved in studying the collection, and from 1893 he produced its catalogue.

== Other work ==
Apart from engaging in collecting, Tretyakov was active in charity. Charity for him was as natural as the creation of a national gallery.

He was an honorary member of the Society of Collectors of the Applied Arts and of the Musical Society from the dates of their foundations. He granted large amounts of money to these organizations, supporting all their educational undertakings. He supported an initiative to help the families of soldiers who died during the Crimean and Russo-Turkish War. He established grants in commercial schools in Moscow and Alexandrovskoe. He never refused monetary help to artists and others, and carefully looked after the affairs of painters who without fear entrusted their savings to him. He repeatedly lent money to his counsellor and adviser I.N. Kramskoi, and to V.G. Khudyakov, K.A. Trutovski, M.K. Klodt.

With his brother Sergey he supported the Moscow School for the Deaf, founded in 1860 by the artist Ivan Karlovich Arnold, and became its patron. In 1900 the school was renamed the Arnoldo-Tretyakov School.

== Death and legacy ==
Pavel Tretyakov died in December 1898, and his funeral was held at the Church of St. Nicholas in Tolmachi where he was an active parishioner. He was buried in Danilov Cemetery, but in 1948 his remains were transferred to Novodevichy Cemetery.

Tretyakov bequeathed half of his estate to charitable purposes. He provided for the financing of the gallery, and also for a shelter for the widows, juvenile children and unmarried daughters of artists who had died.

In his will he also provided large sums for the school for the deaf. He bought a big stone house with a garden for the school. 150 boys and girls lived in this house. Here they were looked after till they reached the age of 16. Tretyakov selected the best teachers, and became acquainted with the methods of study.

A minor planet 3925 Tretʹyakov, discovered by Soviet astronomer Lyudmila Zhuravlyova in 1977 is named after Pavel Tretyakov and his brother Sergei Mikhailovich Tretyakov (1824–1892).

His daughter Vera married the pianist and composer Alexander Siloti. His other daughter, Lyubov, married the maritime artist, Nikolay Gritsenko.
