= Tretyakovsky Proyezd =

Street in Moscow, Russia

Coordinates: 55°45′31″N 37°37′24″E

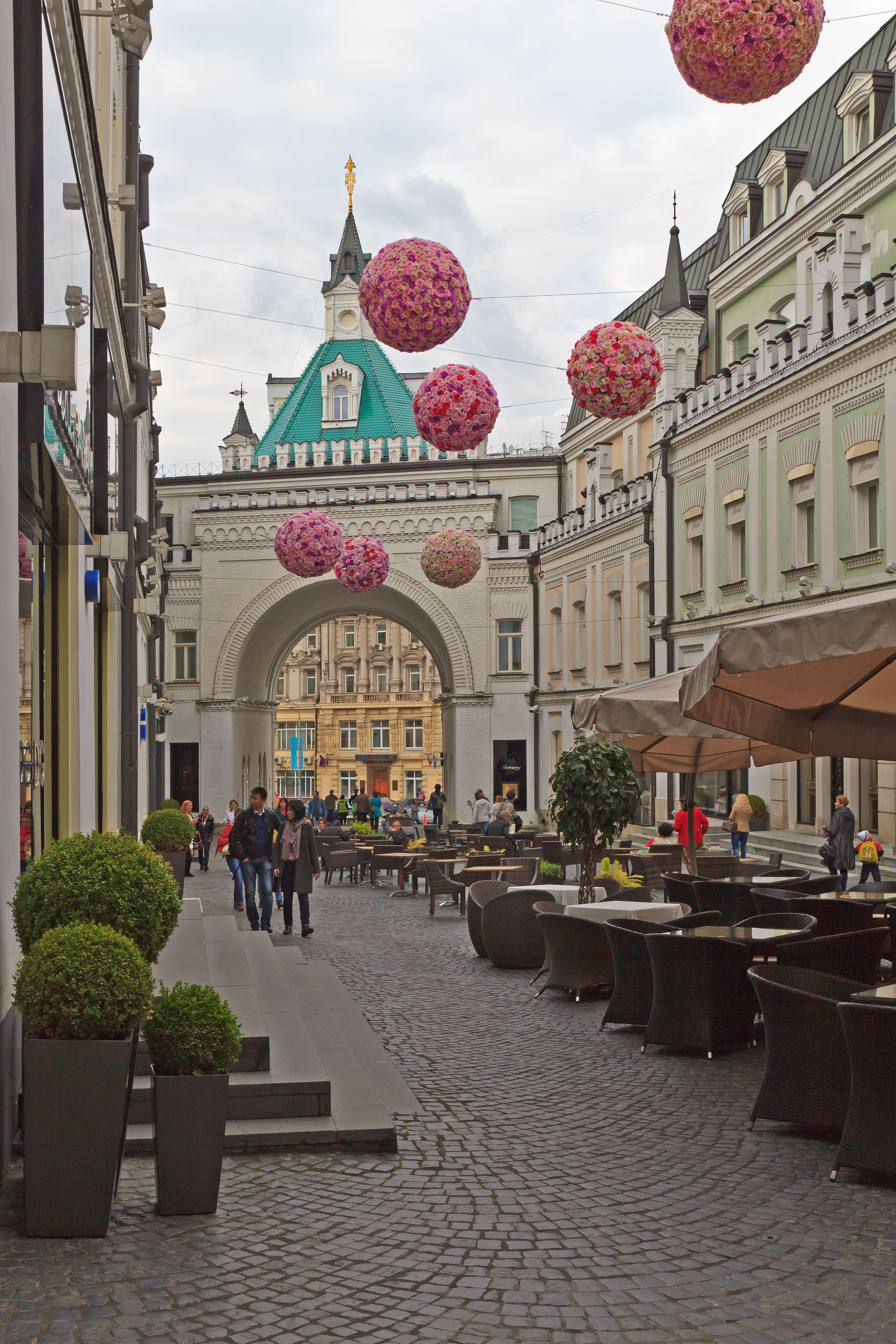
- Tretyakovsky Proyezd after the 2013 renewal
- Interactive map of Tretyakovsky Proyezd
- Native name: Третьяковский проезд (Russian)
- Location: Moscow; Central Administrative Okrug; Tverskoy District
- Postal code: 109012
- Nearest metro station: Lubyanka

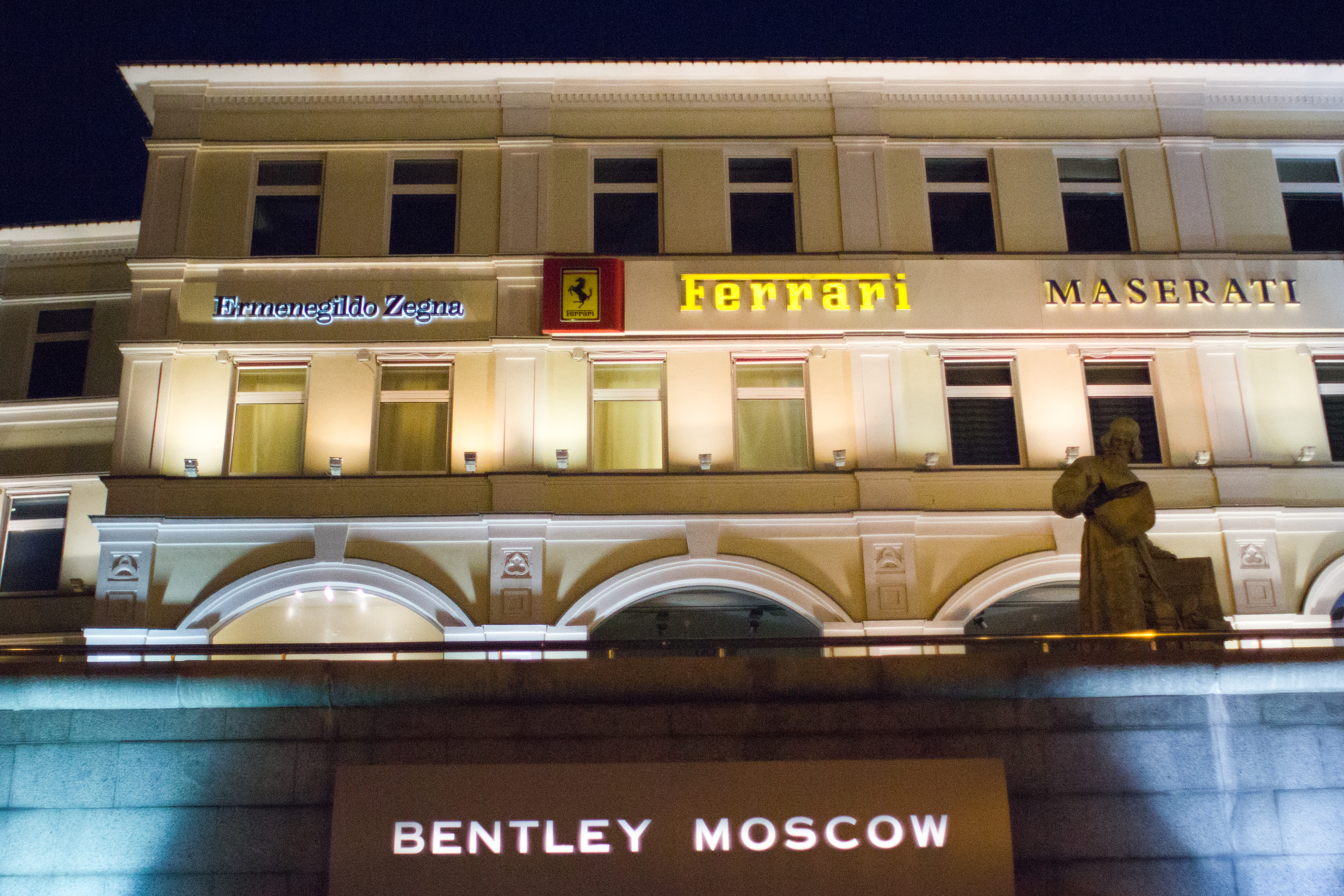
Bentley, Ferrari and Maserati Showroom in Tretyakovsky Proyezd

Tretyakovsky Proyezd or Tretyakov Drive (Russian: Третьяковский проезд) is a short street with boutiques and shops with many luxury goods located in Kitai-gorod in Moscow; it is known as one of the most expensive shopping areas in the world.

The mediaeval-looking archway onto Theatre Drive was designed by architect Alexander Kaminsky (1829–1897) in 1871. The project was financed by Kaminsky's brother-in-law, Pavel Mikhailovich Tretyakov, who was also the founder of the Tretyakov Gallery.

The Tretyakovs' frustration over a blockage on Nikolskaya Street is said to have inspired them to buy the land and revive a Middle Ages thoroughfare from Nikolskaya to the Theatre Drive, across from the former Kitai-gorod wall.

== Shops and showrooms ==
- Bentley
- Ferrari
- Maserati
- Tom Ford
- Ermenegildo Zegna
- Bvlgari
- Ralph Lauren
- Chopard
- Armani
- Prada
- Gucci
- Dolce and Gabbana
- Baccarat
- Pirogi na Nikolskoi (Café)
- Roberto Cavalli
- Yves Saint Laurent
- Tretyakov Lounge (Restaurant)
- Brioni
- Graff
- Tiffany and Co
- Tod's
- Tretyakov Spa by Anne Semonin

== See also ==
- List of upscale shopping districts
- Luxury good
