= Alexander Kaminsky =

Russian architect

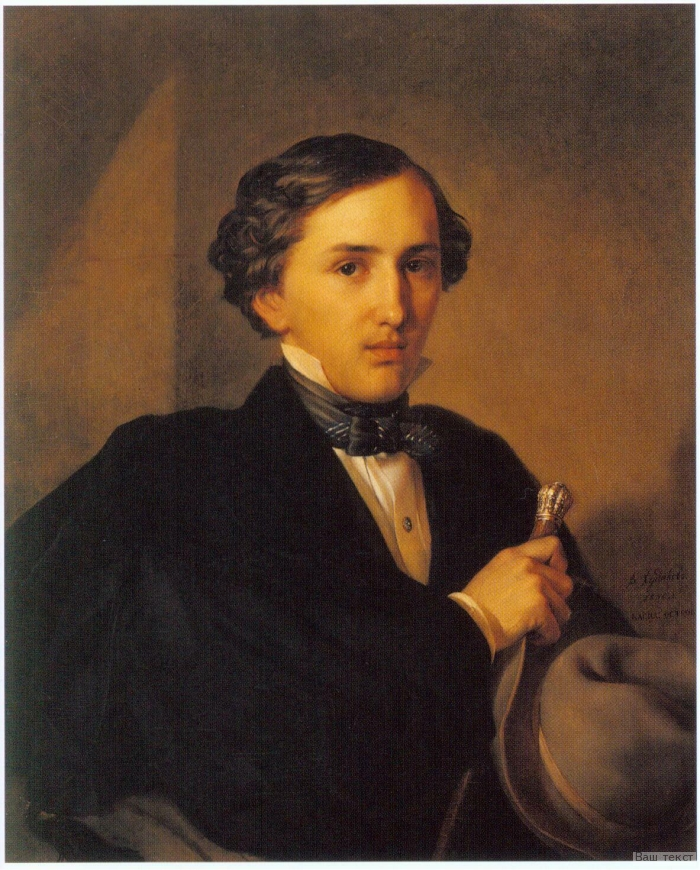
- Portrait by Vasily Khudyakov (1850)
- Born: December 10, 1829
- Died: December 17, 1897 (aged 68); Moscow
- Occupation: Architect
- Practice: Own firm
- Buildings: Cathedral of Nikolo-Ugresh monastery
- Projects: Tretyakovsky Proyezd arcades

Alexander Stepanovich Kaminsky (1829–1897, Russian: Александр Степанович Каминский, sometimes spelled Kamensky, Каменский) was a Russian architect working in Moscow and suburbs. One of the most successful and prolific architects of the 1860s–1880s, Kaminsky was a faithful eclecticist, equally skilled in Russian Revival, Neo-Gothic and Renaissance Revival architecture. He is best remembered for the extant Tretyakovsky Proyezd shopping arcade and the cathedral of Nikolo-Ugresh monastery in present-day town of Dzerzhinsky.

== Biography ==
Kaminsky was born in a noble family in Kiev Governorate. In 1848–1857 he studied architecture under Konstantin Thon at the Imperial Academy of Arts in Saint Petersburg; meanwhile Alexander's brother, Joseph Kaminsky, was a construction manager for Thon's Cathedral of Christ the Saviour in Moscow. Alexander served as a liaison between Petersburg-based Thon and Moscow crews, acquiring his first practical experience.

In 1857, Kaminsky won a state-paid postgraduate tour of Europe, and travelled extensively until 1861. In Paris, he met Pavel Tretyakov, a young member of an influential Muscovite business family and an art collector. Back in Moscow, friendship with Tretyakovs resulted in his first independent commissions. Next year, Alexander married Sophia, sister of Pavel Tretyakov; he remained Tretyakov's house architect until the end of his career.

Since 1867, Kaminsky was also a house architect for Moscow Merchant Society, a real estate consortium that redeveloped the territories of Kitai-Gorod and Neglinnaya Street. His best known jobs for the Moscow Merchant Society were the Neglinnaya Street offices and rebuilding the Exchange Building in Ilyinka Street. These kinds of rebuilding projects were common for Kaminsky, as well as traditional, spacious town estates including Chetverikov Estate in Kolpachny Lane and Karatayeva-Morozova Estate in Leontyevsky Lane. Kaminsky was an accomplished eclecticist and never committed to a particular style. Like Thon, he picked styling depending on the building functions and the client's budget.

For about thirty years, Kaminsky was teaching at the Moscow School of Painting, Sculpture and Architecture and training its graduates within his firm (his alumni include Fyodor Schechtel, Ivan Mashkov, Ilya Bondarenko, Max Hoeppener).

Architect's career was cut short in 1888 when a Kuznetsky Most building, erected by his firm, collapsed. Kaminsky was found guilty of criminal negligence and sentenced to six weeks of arrest. Professional agony dragged for another five years. Saving his reputation, Kaminsky founded and edited a magazine (Russian: Художественный сборник работ русских архитекторов и инженеров, 1890–1892), promoting his own works; he ultimately failed to return into the business, lost the job with Merchant Society in 1893 and died in 1897. His last work, a church in Sarov, was completed in 1903.

== Selected works ==
Extant:

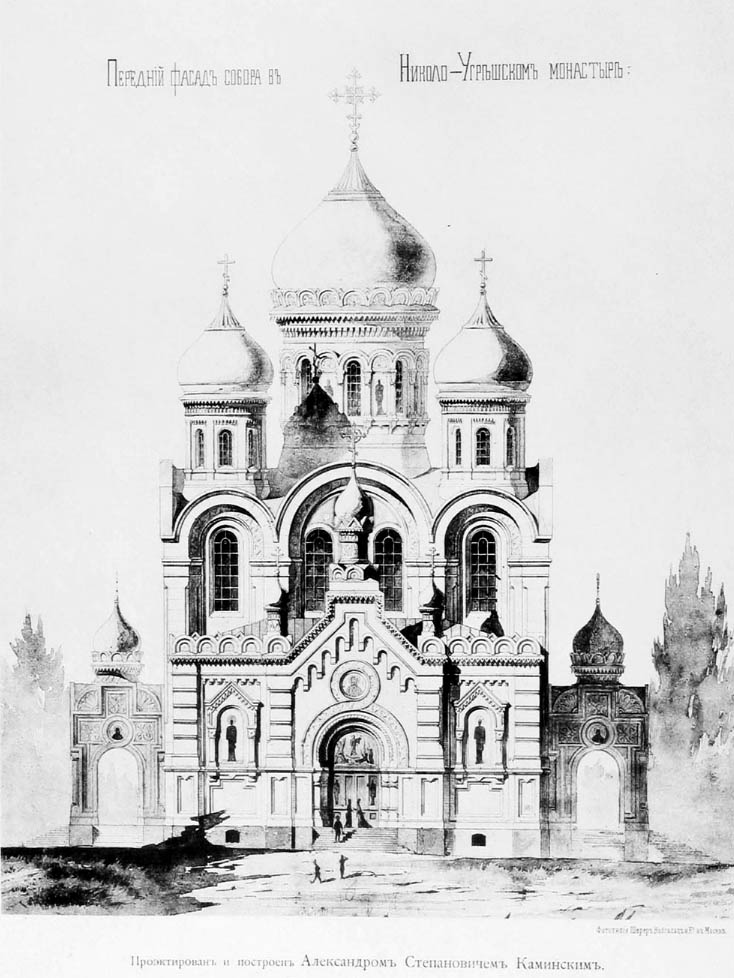
Nikolo-Ugresh Cathedral

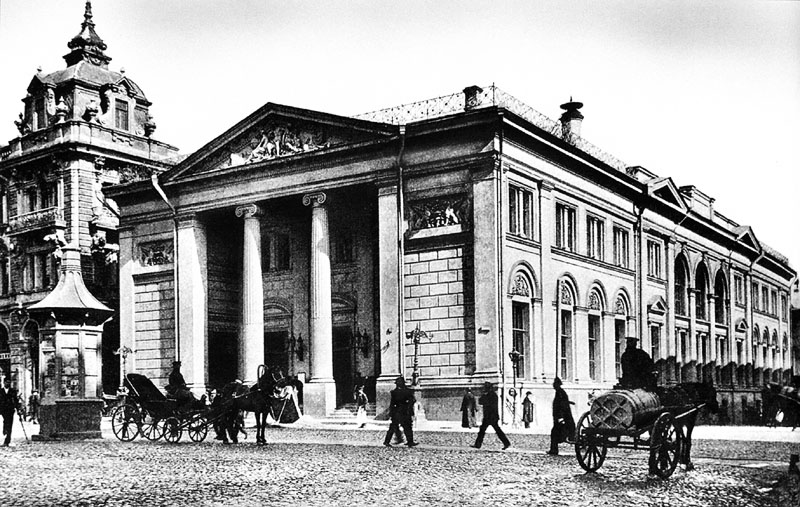
Exchange in Kitai-gorod

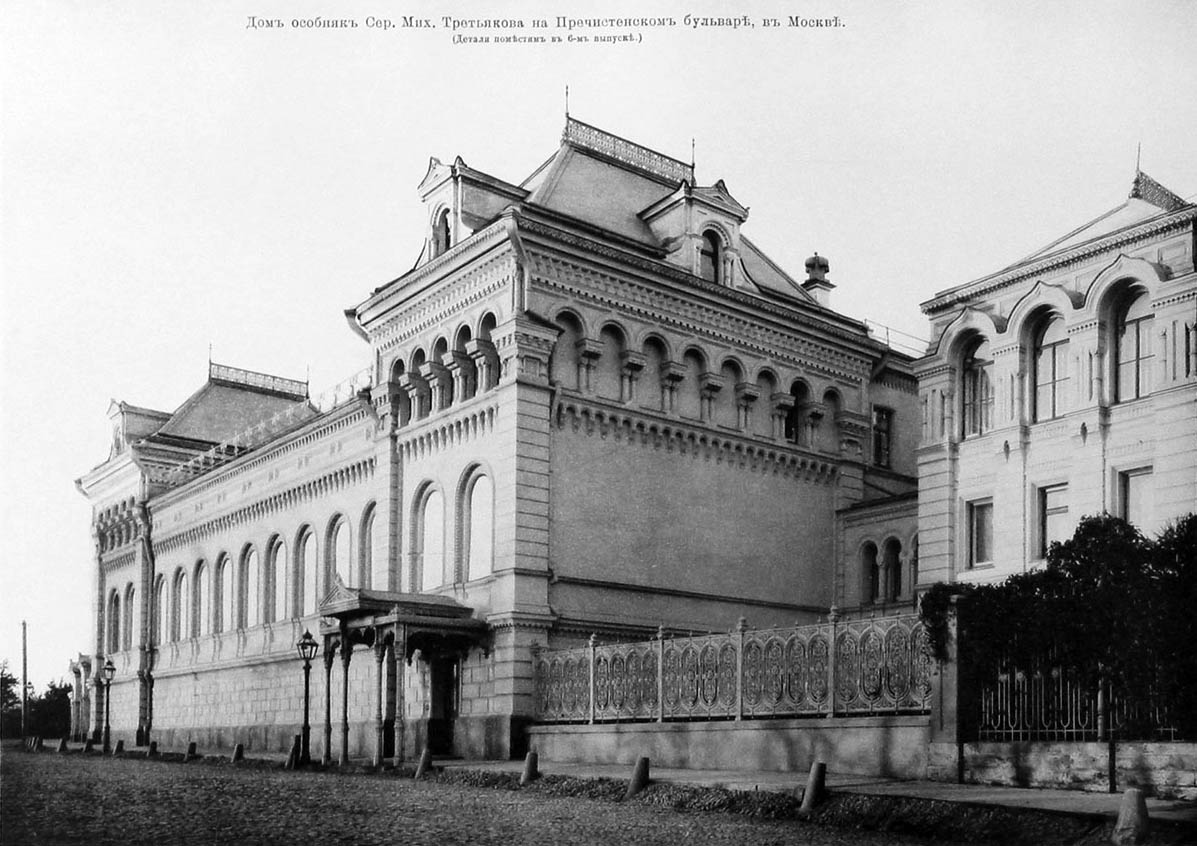
Tretyakov's house, Gogol Boulevard

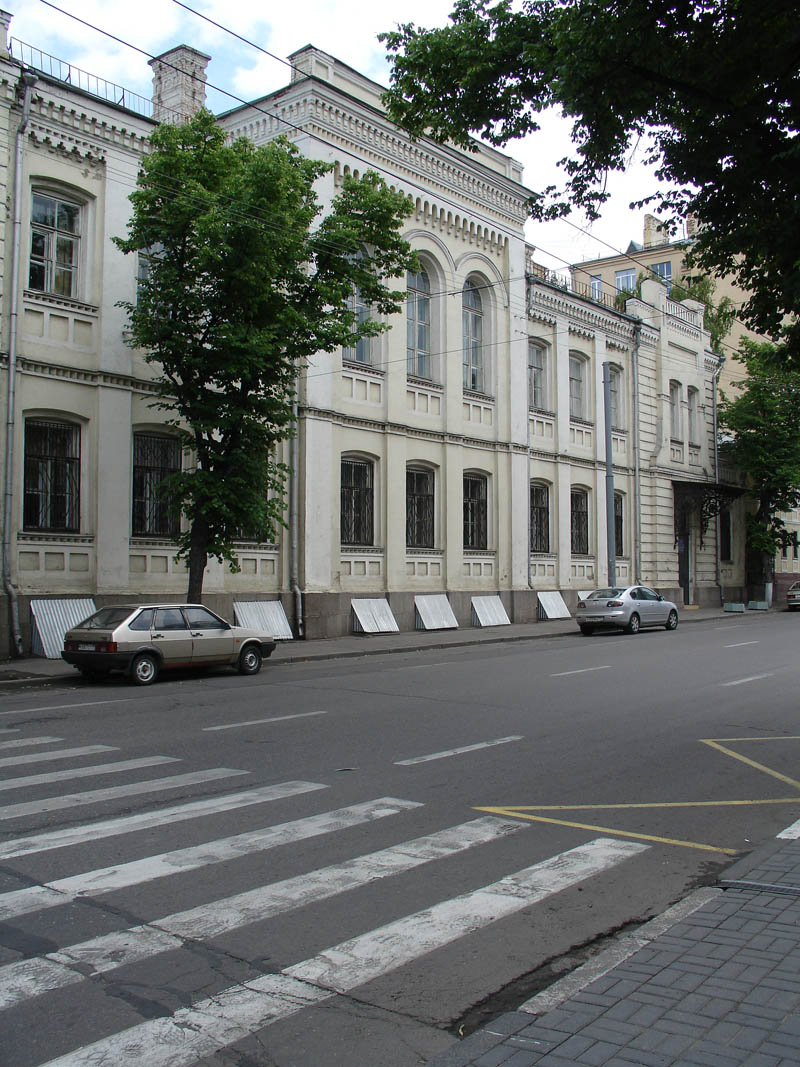
College, Bolshaya Ordynka Street

Destroyed:

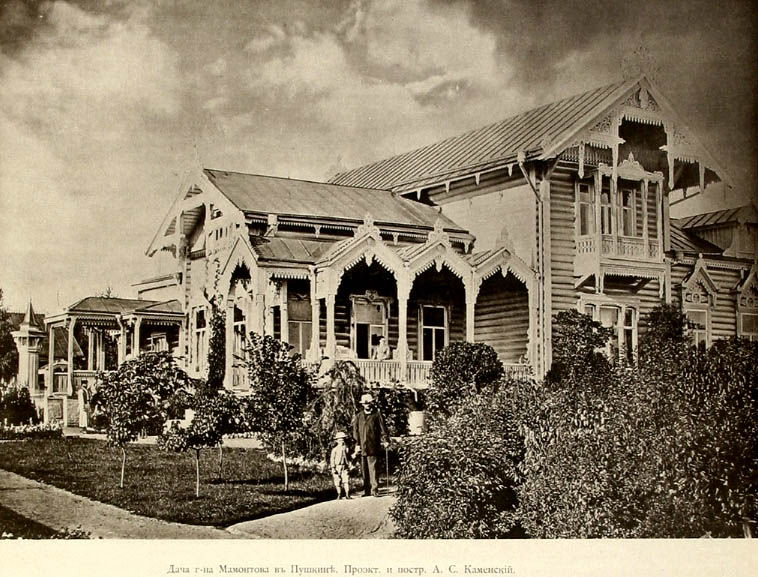
Mamonov house

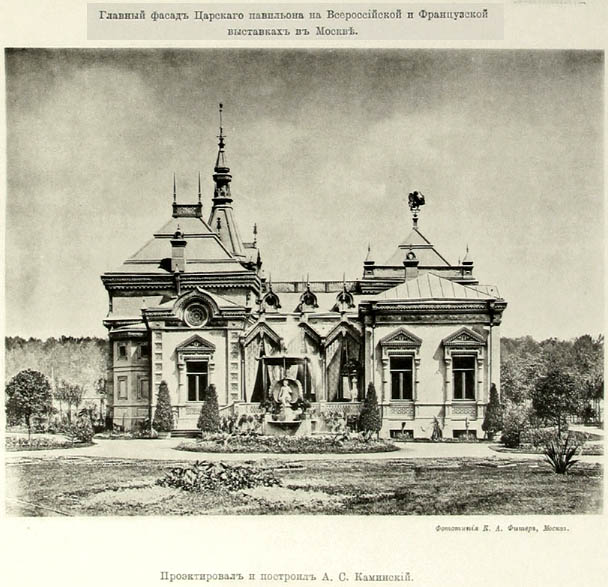
Royal pavilion, Moscow

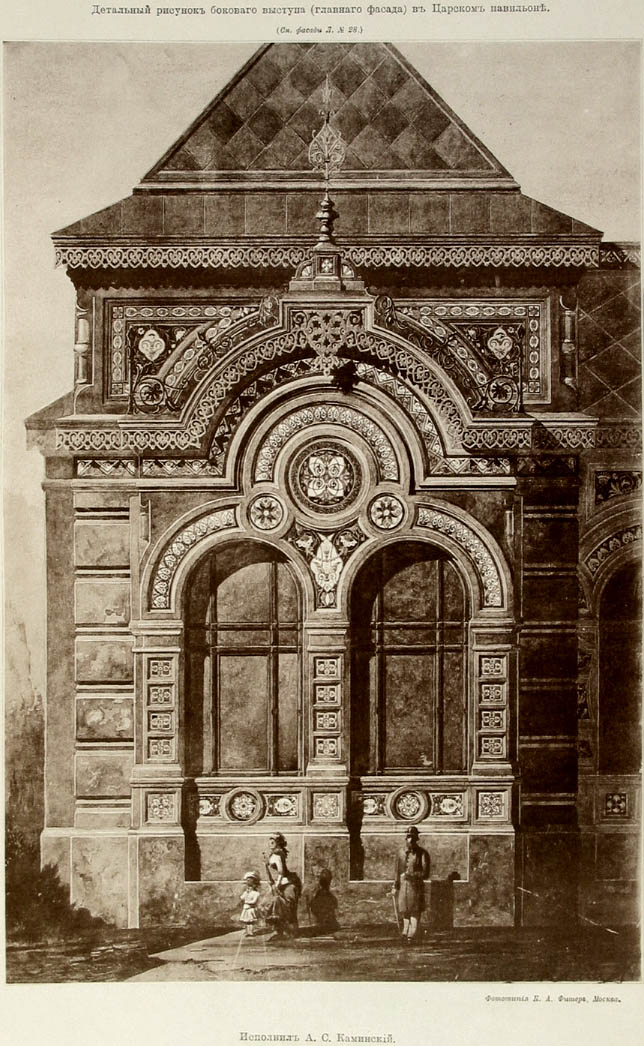
Royal pavilion

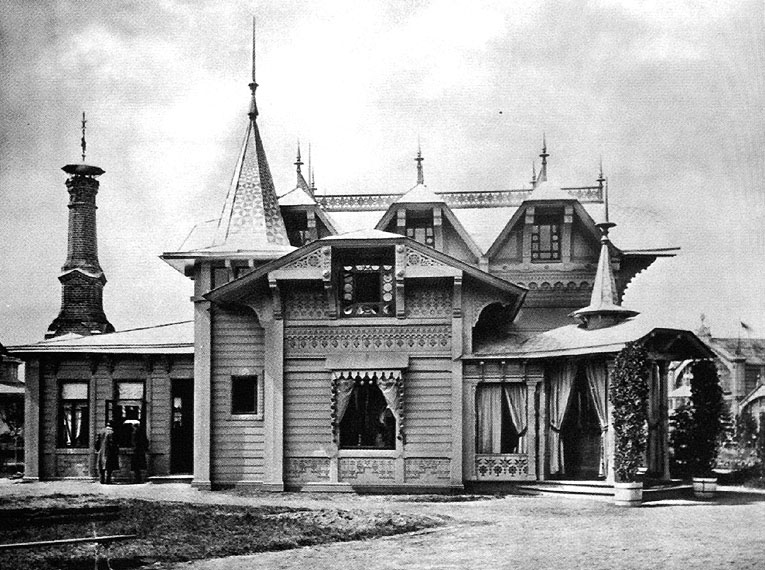
Exhibition pavilion (completed by Ilya Bondarenko)

Interiors:

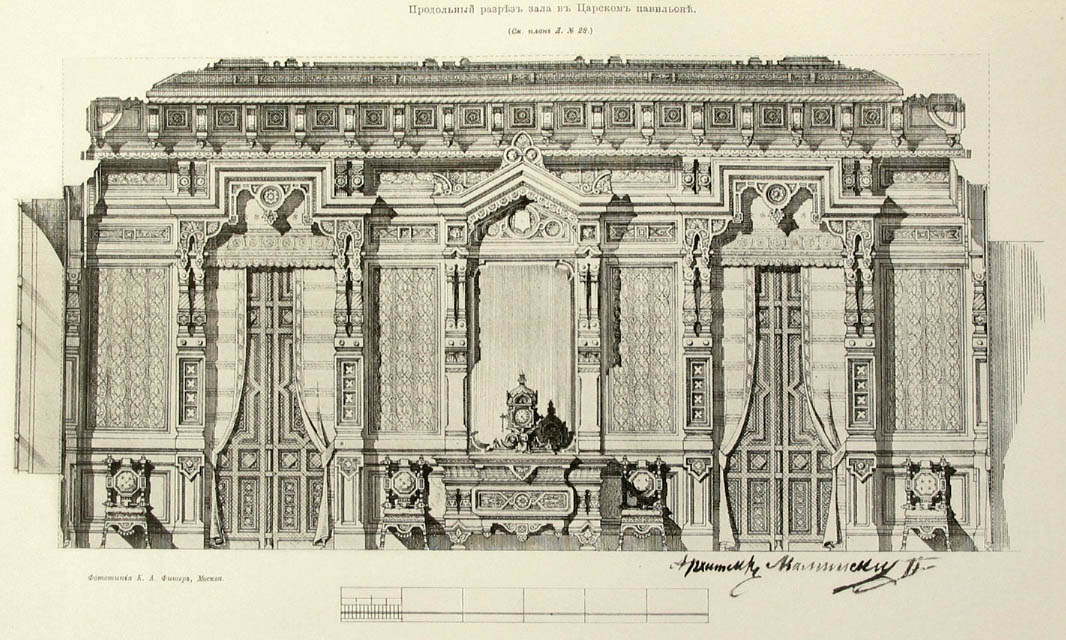
Royal pavilion, Moscow

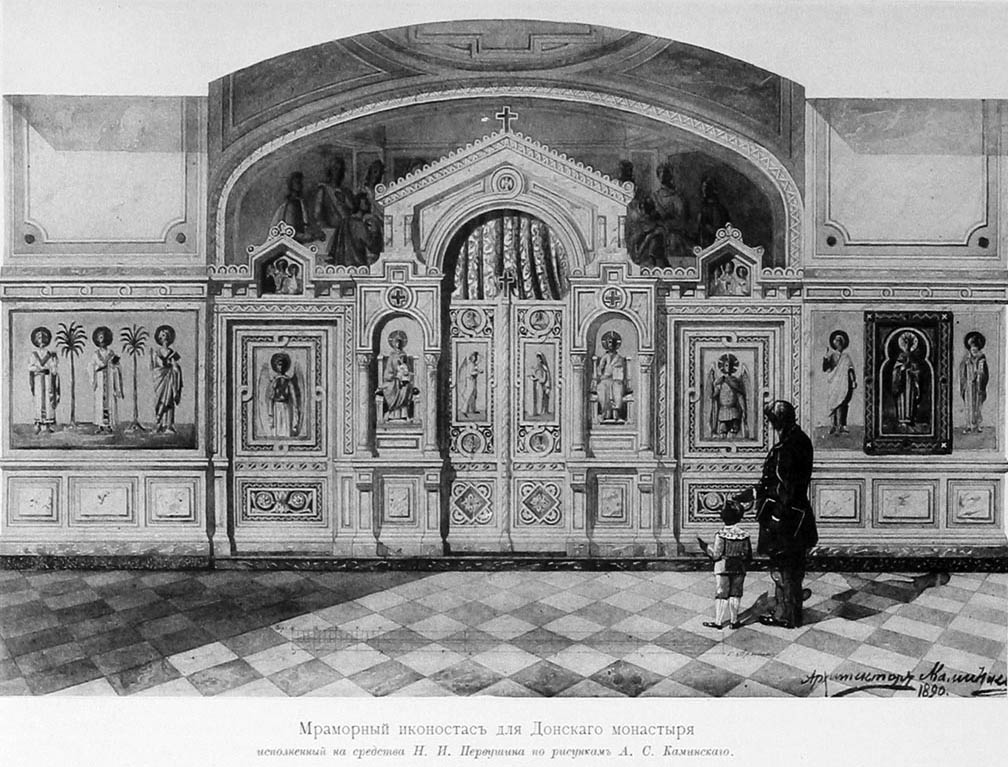
Iconostasis, Donskoy monastery

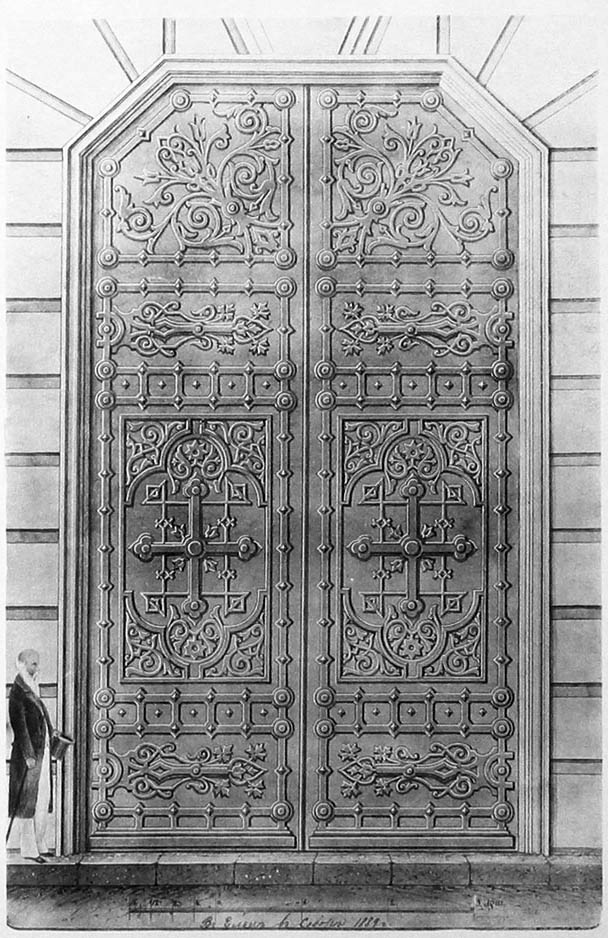
Gates of Yelets Cathedral

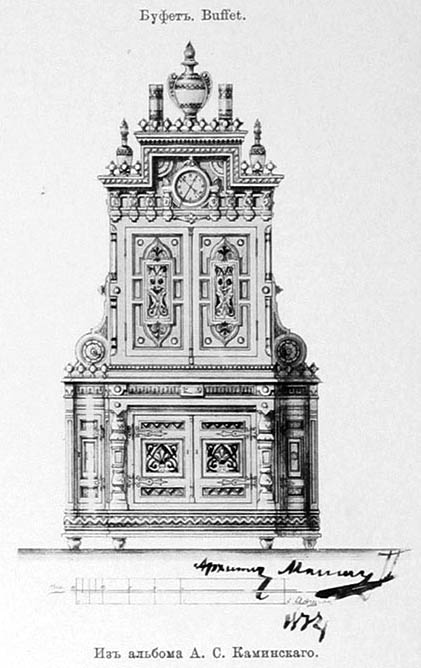
Furniture design
