= Recognition of the Islamic Emirate of Afghanistan =

The Taliban has ruled Afghanistan as the Islamic Emirate of Afghanistan since taking control by force in 2021, overthrowing the internationally recognized Islamic Republic of Afghanistan. The takeover was widely disapproved by the international community. As of July 2025, only one member state of the United Nations, Russia, has extended diplomatic recognition to the new regime, even though many states maintain nominal relations with Afghanistan.

The Taliban previously ruled Afghanistan from 1996 to 2001 and received limited diplomatic recognition, with the United Nations and most countries continuing to recognize the Islamic State of Afghanistan. The Taliban has campaigned for international recognition since the takeover, gradually taking over the Islamic Republic's foreign diplomatic missions. Ousted president Ashraf Ghani has largely remained silent since the takeover, and has not formed a government-in-exile. Ghani's vice president Amrullah Saleh declared himself caretaker president and relocated to Panjshir Province after the Taliban takeover with the support of the National Resistance Front (NRF). However, he fled Afghanistan after the Taliban quickly captured the province. Although the NRF continues to wage a guerrilla insurgency, it has failed to take any territory and neither Saleh nor the NRF have received any international support, leaving the Taliban as the only viable claimant to Afghanistan's government.

== 1996–2001 ==
Between 1996 and 2001, only three UN member states—Pakistan, Saudi Arabia, and the United Arab Emirates (UAE)—recognized the Islamic Emirate as the rightful government of Afghanistan. The Islamic Emirate received recognition from the partially recognized Chechen Republic of Ichkeria, though Chechen president Aslan Maskhadov would later describe the Islamic Emirate as an "illegitimate" government.

The Taliban government was not recognized by the United Nations, which instead continued to recognize the Islamic State of Afghanistan as the legitimate government of Afghanistan.

== 2021–present ==
=== Russian recognition ===
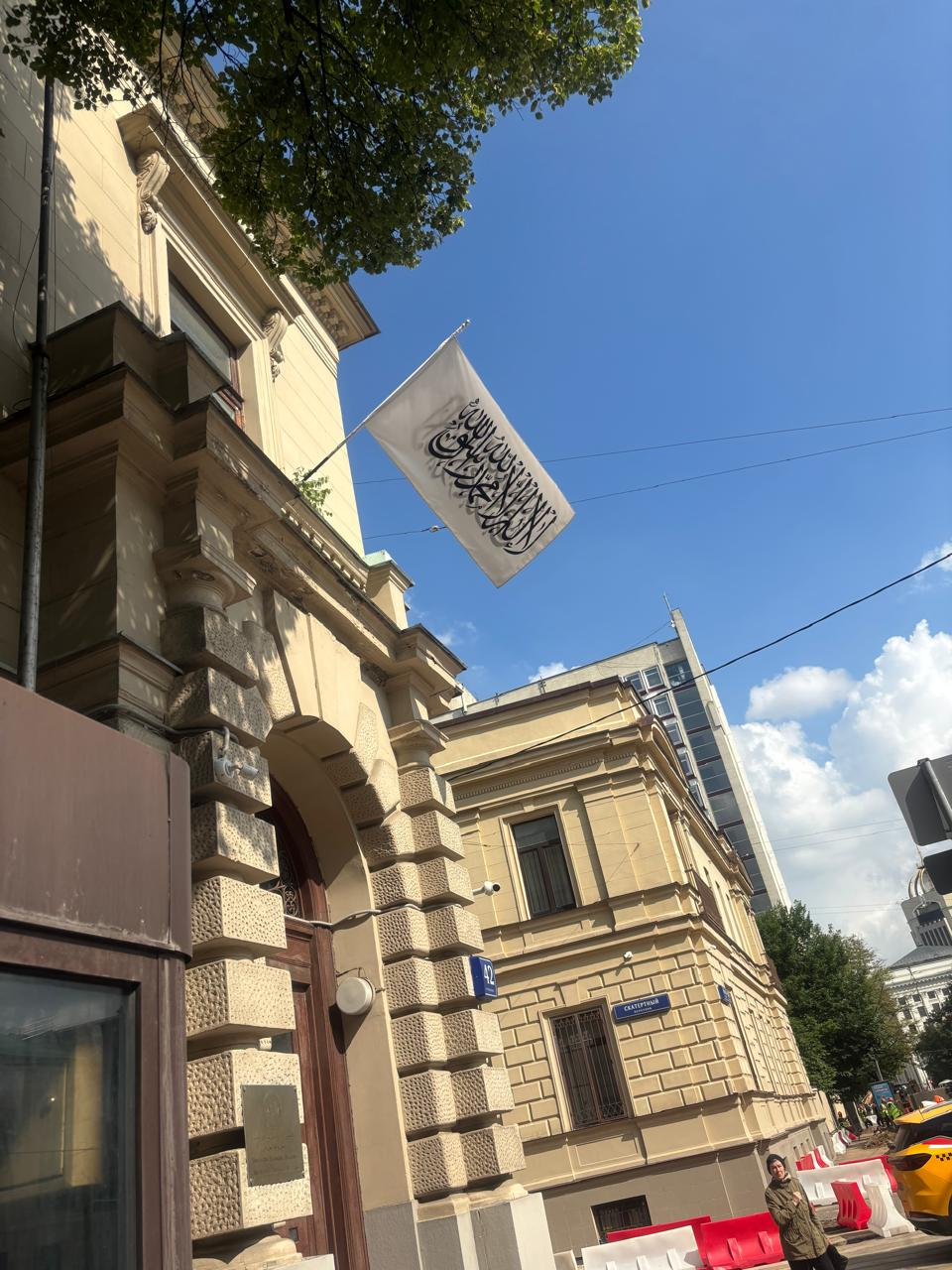
The Afghan Embassy in Moscow uses the name "Islamic Emirate" and flies the Taliban flag, with recognition from the Russian government.

Only Russia has officially endorsed the legitimacy of the Islamic Emirate of Afghanistan and Taliban leadership, a decision which was made in 2025. Other countries have engaged with the leadership unofficially, though with varying degrees of formality.

=== United Nations ===
The United Nations determined in 2022 that the Islamic Republic of Afghanistan had ceased to exist on 15 August 2021, and that neither it nor any of its officials, including Ashraf Ghani, remained legitimate representatives of Afghanistan. The caretaker representative of Afghanistan to the UN, Naseer Faiq, has since renounced the Islamic Republic, instead portraying himself as an independent representative of Afghanistan. The UN has not recognized the Taliban or any other entity as the new representative of Afghanistan and has repeatedly deferred review of Taliban requests for Suhail Shaheen to be credentialed as the permanent representative.

In addition, in 2022, the United Nations General Assembly adopted A/RES/77/10 titled "The situation in Afghanistan." The resolution condemns the Taliban government and urges non-recognition.

=== International community views on conditions for recognition ===
Several countries have vowed never to recognize the Islamic Emirate, and others have said they will do so only if human rights in the country are respected (in particular, those of women). Some countries such as China have accredited Taliban diplomats despite not recognizing the Islamic Emirate, and some have appointed new ambassadors to Afghanistan which have been accepted by the Taliban. Other countries, including Canada and Tajikistan, have designated the Taliban as a terrorist organization. Kazakhstan removed the prohibition in 2023 after a controversial business forum featuring Afghan Minister Nooruddin Azizi.

The government of Iran has stated there are no obstacles towards recognition of the government of Afghanistan, however it is yet to do so.

=== Status of embassies ===
As of early 2025, 12 foreign embassies and two consulates of the former Islamic Republic continued to operate, staffed by diplomatic officials of the former state, despite it ceasing to exist. As of August 2024, five of these embassies had co-ordinated with the Taliban, such that consular documents issued by these embassies will be accepted by the Taliban.

== See also ==
- Foreign relations of Afghanistan
- List of international trips made by Amir Khan Muttaqi as Minister of Foreign Affairs of Afghanistan
- International relations with the Taliban
