= Cyril Farey =

English architect (1888–1954)

- Born: 28 April 1888; London, England
- Died: 7 December 1954 (aged 66); London, England
- Education: Tonbridge School ('05); Architectural Association; Royal Academy of Arts
- Spouse: Lydia Annie Mary Gunster (m. 1915)

Cyril Arthur Farey FRIBA (28 April 1888 – 7 December 1954) was a British architect and architectural illustrator, known most widely for his detailed pencil and watercolour perspective depictions of architectural and engineering landmarks in the first half of the 20th century.

== Early life and education ==
Born in London in 1888, he was educated at Tonbridge School and served his articles in the offices of architect Horace Field between 1911 and 1913, attending the Architectural Association and the Royal Academy School of Architecture. Winner of the RA Schools Bronze Medal in 1911, Farey subsequently won the Tite Prize in 1913, the Soane Medallion in 1914, and in 1921 both the Edward Stott Travelling Studentship prize and the Royal Academy Gold Medal. He was nominated as an Associate of the Royal Institute of British Architects in 1918 and became a Fellow in 1941. During the First World War he served in the Royal Army Service Corps, attaining the rank of captain. Farey also worked for a period in the offices of Sir Ernest Newton RA, before setting up his own architectural practice.

== Career ==
He became perhaps the most renowned British architectural draughtsman of the twentieth century, providing commissioned illustrations for numerous leading architects including Edwin Lutyens and Frank Lloyd Wright and was considered along with William Walcot to be one of the preeminent architectural draftsmen of the period. Farey travelled extensively in Europe and was commissioned to provide technical illustrations for both Frank Lloyd Wright's 1923 Tokyo Imperial Hotel and the Sydney Harbour Bridge. Other illustrations he is known for include:

- Lutyens' unrealized design for Liverpool Metropolitan Cathedral.
- Depictions of St Paul's Cathedral and the City of London during World War II, where he volunteered as a member of the Fire-Guard Watch protecting the cathedral from incendiary bombs.

He partnered with Graham Dawbarn and in 1924 they provided the winning design for classroom and administrative structures of Raffles College in Singapore. From 1947 he partnered with son Michael Farey and John J Adams.

== Selected architectural work ==
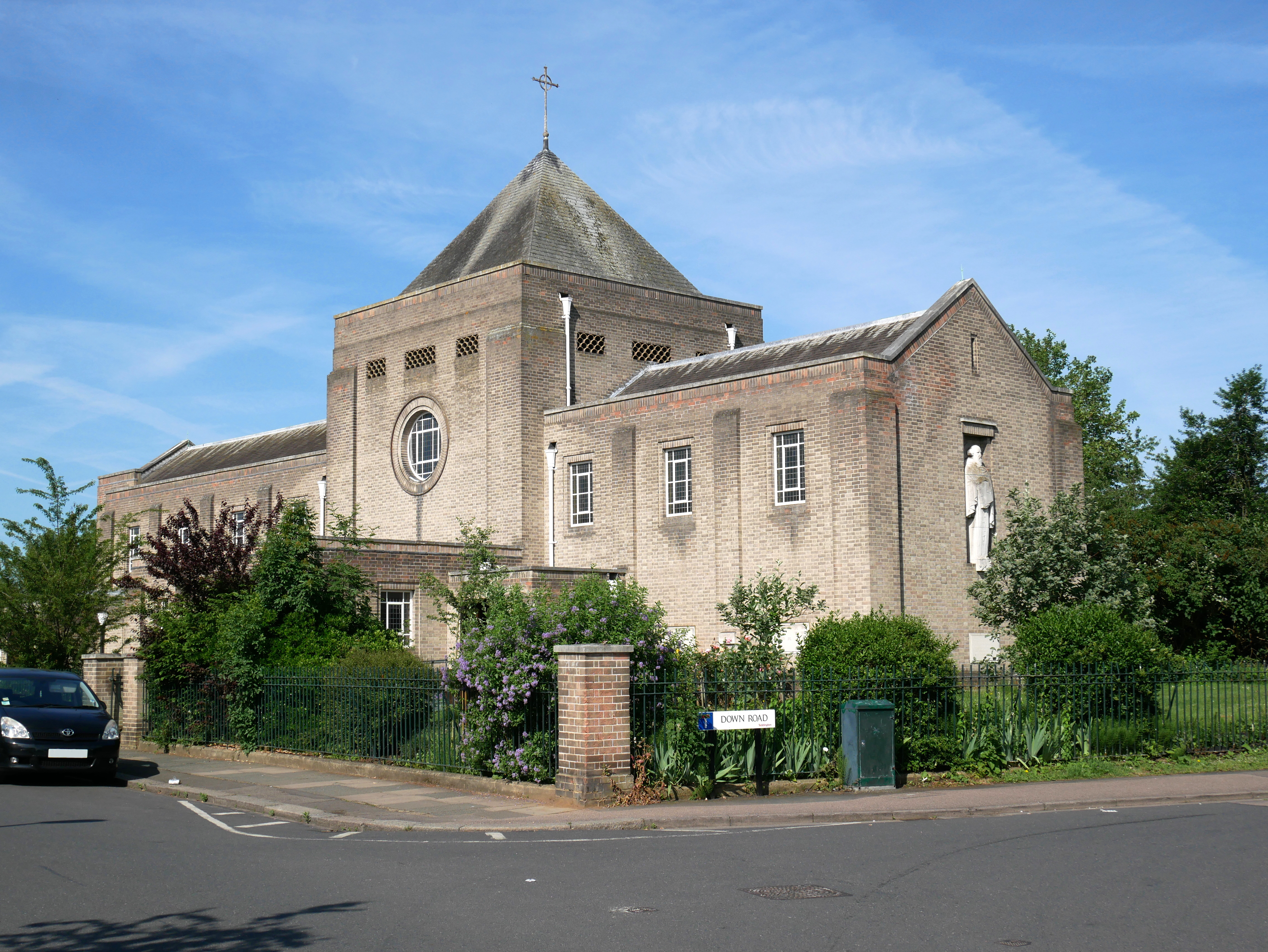
- St Mark's Church, Teddington
  2 Wildwood Rise, Hampstead Garden Suburb, (Won second prize in a Country Life competition in 1913)
- Bukit Timah Campus, National University of Singapore (Former Raffles College buildings - opened in 1928)
- St George's Church Hall (1929), (Grade II Listed, 2006), Headstone, Harrow.
- St Mark's Church, Teddington (1939)
- St Peter's Church (1941), Grange Park, Enfield
- All Hallows' Church (1941), North Greenford, Ealing

== Gallery of illustrations ==
=== Designs by Farey ===
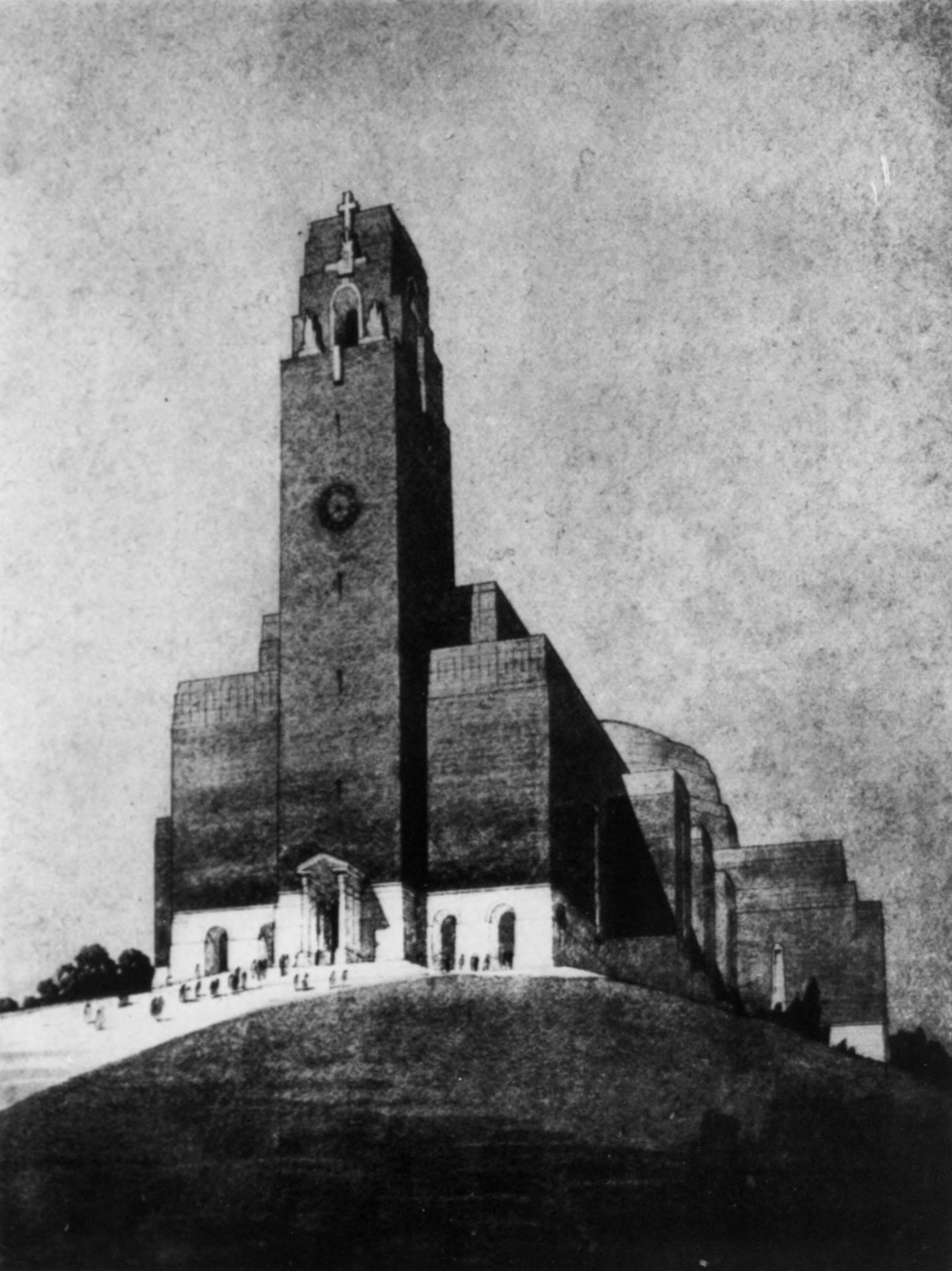
Design for a cathedral

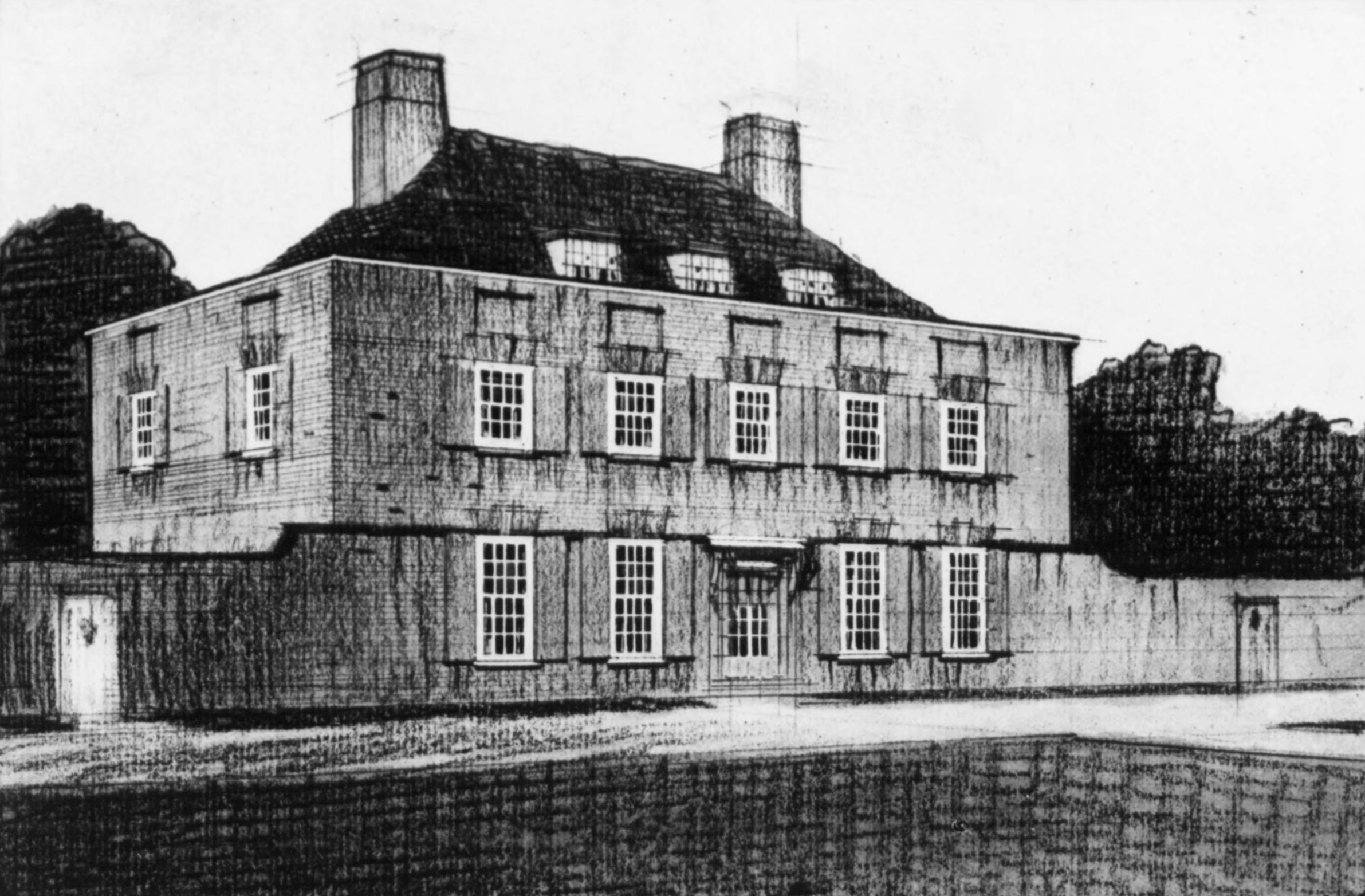
Design for a house in Newbury

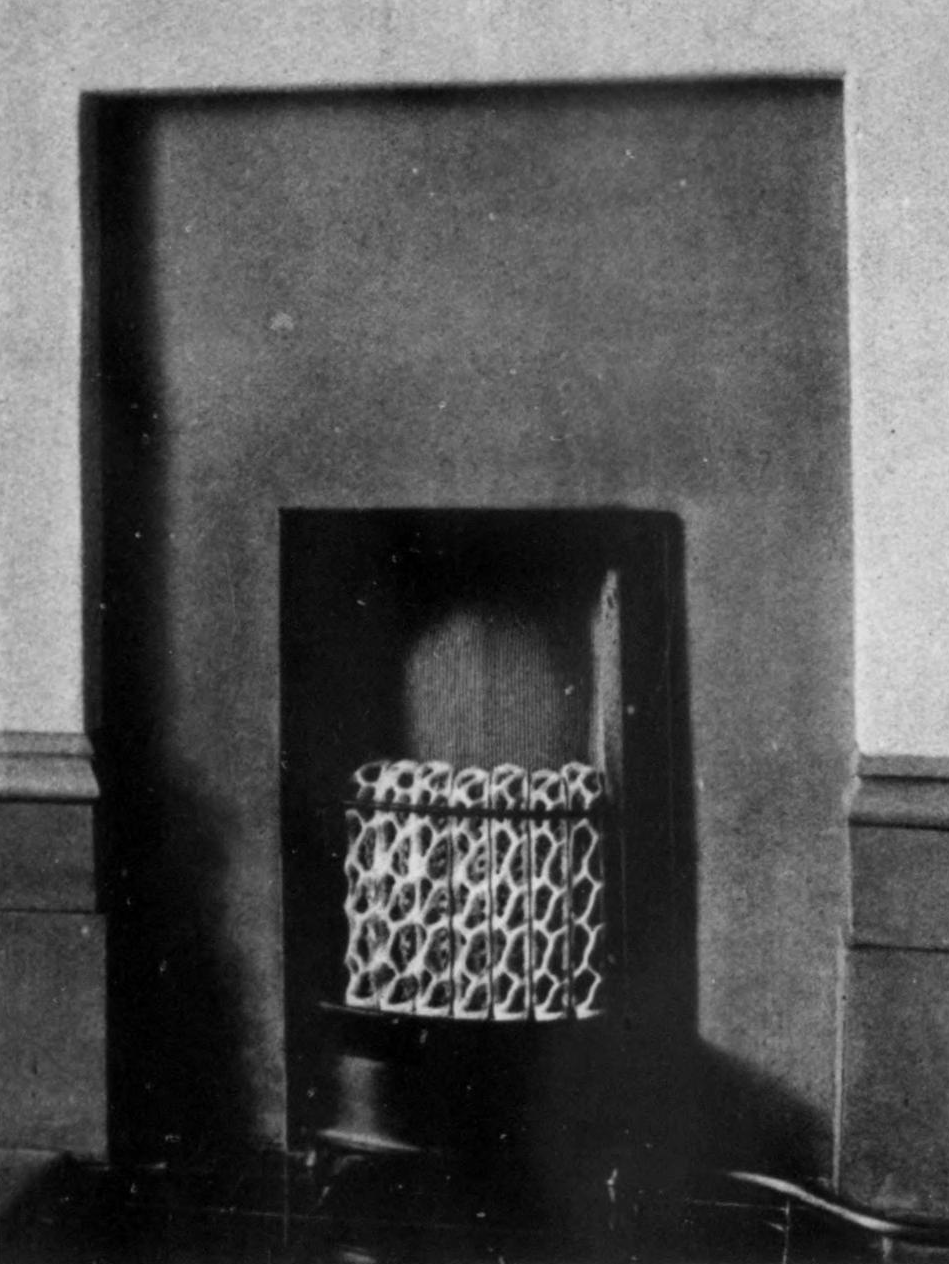
Fireplace in Farey's own home

=== Designs by others ===
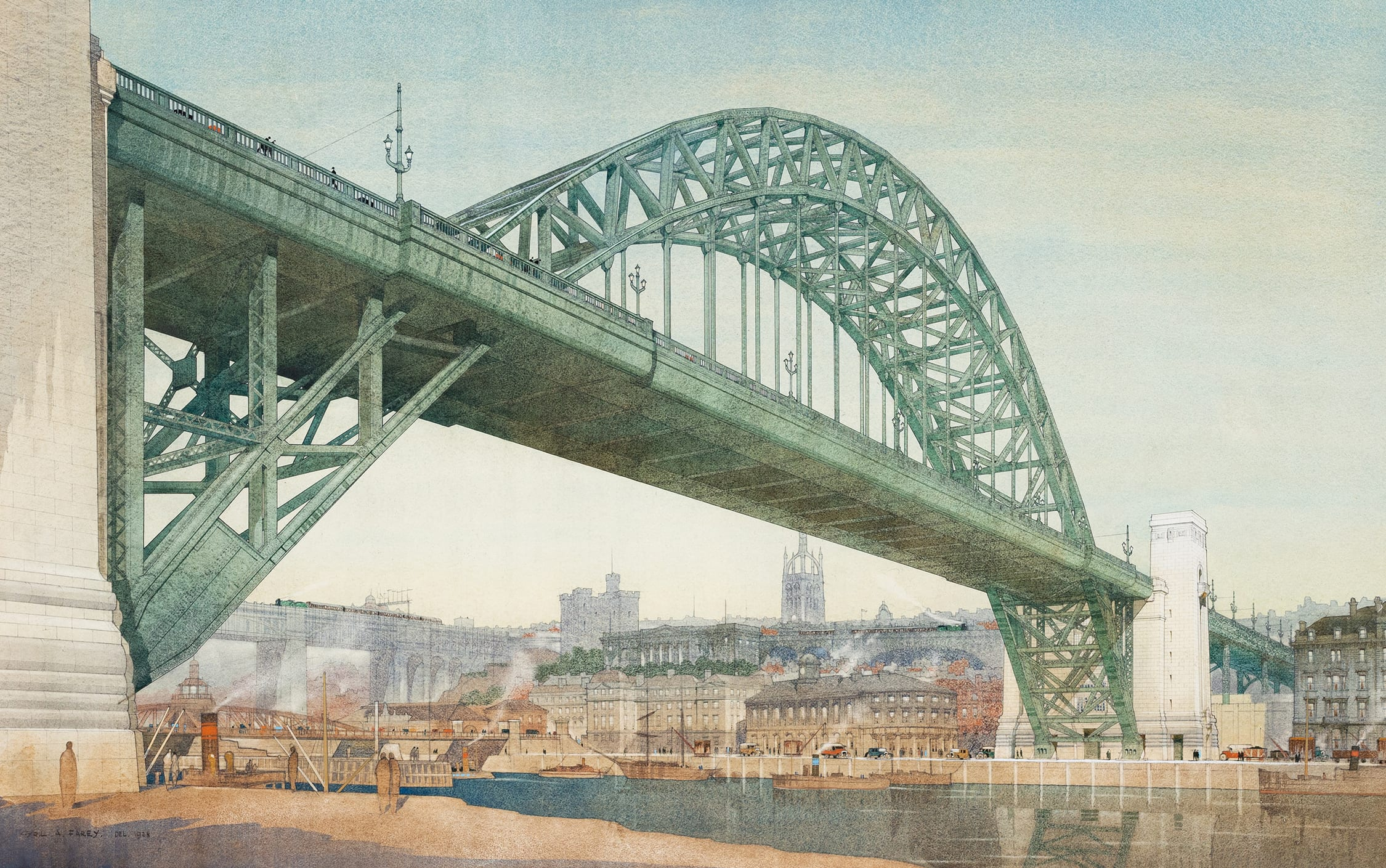
Tyne Bridge

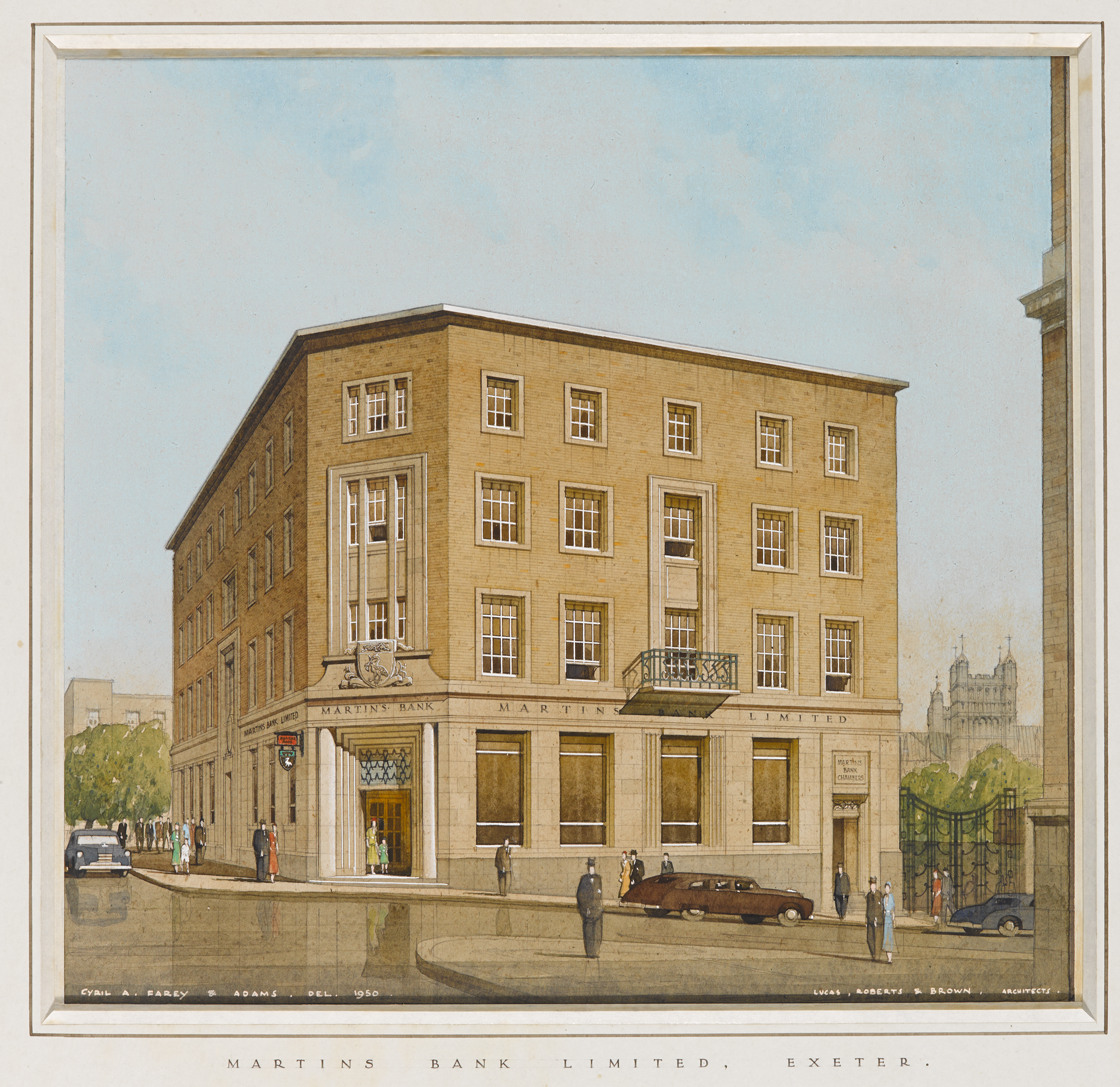
Martin's Bank, Exeter

== Publications ==
- "Architectural Drawing, Perspective, and Rendering" Published with A. Trystan Edwards in 1931
