= Afghanistan–Russia relations =

- Afghanistan: Russia

Diplomatic mission
- Afghan Embassy, Moscow: Russian Embassy, Kabul

Envoy
- Ambassador Gul Hasan: Ambassador Dmitry Zhirnov

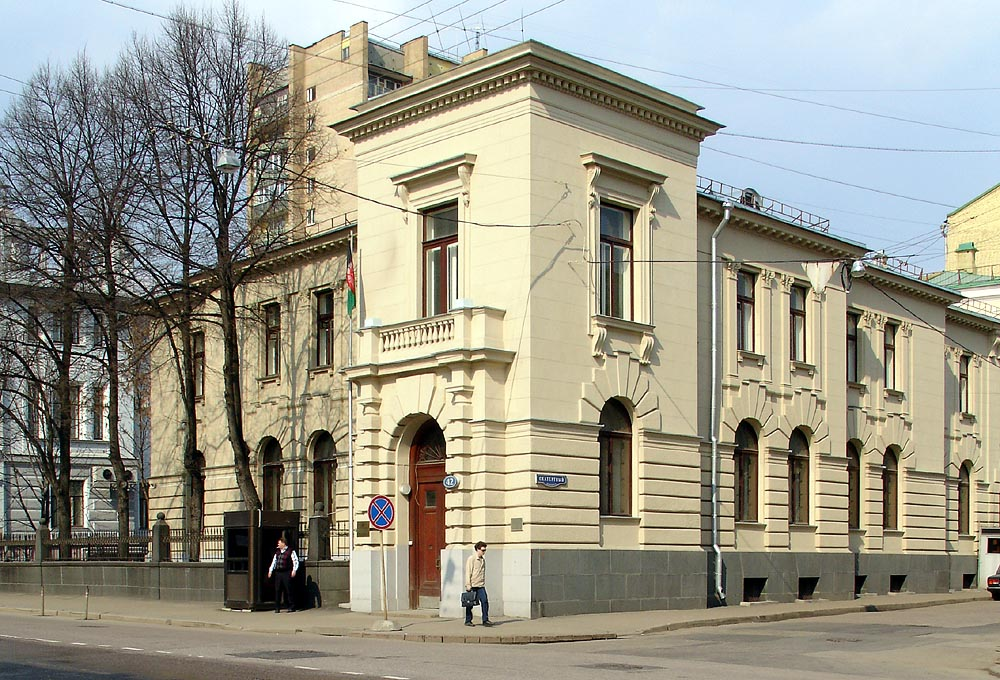
Afghan embassy in Moscow, Russia.

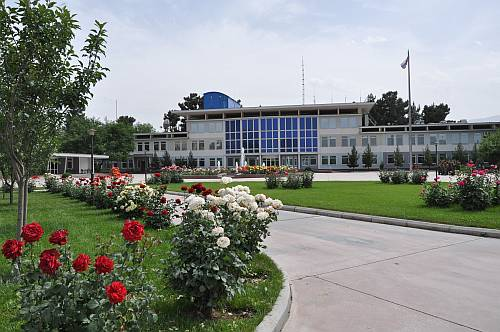
Russian embassy in Kabul, Afghanistan.

Relations between Afghanistan and Russia first emerged in the 19th century. At the time they were placed in the context of "The Great Game", Russian–British confrontations over Afghanistan from 1840 to 1907. The Soviet Union was the first country to establish diplomatic relations with Afghanistan following the Third Anglo-Afghan War in 1919. On 28 February 1921, Afghanistan and the Soviet Russia signed a Friendship Treaty. The Soviet Union intervened in Afghanistan against the Basmachi movement in 1929 and 1930.

Following the Second World War, the Kingdom of Afghanistan and the Soviet Union formed a friendly relationship, and the latter provided much aid and development to Afghanistan. Following the Saur Revolution, the two countries signed a friendship treaty in 1978. In 1979 the Soviet Union invaded Afghanistan in Operation Storm-333. This action precipitated a negative reaction in most of the Muslim world, and contributing to a decline in Afghanistan's prosperity and a strengthening of lawlessness and radical elements within the country. The Russian-backed Afghan government collapsed in 1992. However, Russo-Afghan relations have improved somewhat in the years following the conflict. The Islamic Republic of Afghanistan under Hamid Karzai was also one of the few countries that recognized the 2014 Russian annexation of Crimea.

In July 2025, Russia became the first country to recognize the Islamic Emirate of Afghanistan. On 16 January 2026, the Russian government formally accepted the credentials of Gul Hasan, the Taliban-appointed ambassador to Moscow, granting him official diplomatic status. Russia now has an embassy in Kabul and a consulate-general in Mazar-e-Sharif, and Afghanistan has an embassy in Moscow.

== Historical relations ==
=== Imperial era ===
The Russian Empire first established diplomatic relations with Afghanistan in 1837, at a time of strained diplomatic relations between Great Britain and Russia, the "Great Game". Imperial Russia desired a direct trading route with India. Initial contact with Afghanistan was viewed with suspicion by the British Empire, which suspected Russia of attempting to expand its territory into the Indian subcontinent. The Russian government opened diplomatic relations with Afghanistan. This, combined with their support of Iranian ruler Mohammad Shah Qajar's attempt to conquer Herat in 1838, resulted in the British invasion of Afghanistan during the First Anglo-Afghan War (1839–42).

Throughout the 19th century Russia steadily advanced across Central Asia, conquering Tashkent in 1865, Samarkand and Kokand in 1868, and Khiva in 1873. Britain suggested Afghanistan as a buffer state, but following the June 1878 Congress of Berlin Russia sent a diplomatic mission to Kabul. Sher Ali Khan, the Amir of Afghanistan, attempted to keep the Russian envoys out, but they arrived in Kabul on 22 July 1878. On 14 August, the British demanded that Sher Ali accept a British mission as well. This incident resulted in the Second Anglo-Afghan War.

The Panjdeh incident in 1885 was the next major event in the history of Afghan-Russian relations. Once again, the British-Russian rivalry boiled over after Russia seized several oases from Afghanistan. The British threatened war, but the nations made an agreement in 1887 establishing a buffer zone in Central Asia. In the Anglo-Russian Convention of 1907, the Russian Empire and British Empire divided up spheres of influence, with Russia agreeing to concede Afghanistan to the British side, in exchange for Central Asia and northern Iran. Afghanistan was neutral in World War I, despite the Niedermayer–Hentig Expedition by the Central Powers.

The 1916 Central Asian Revolt led to the Basmachi movement, which received some support from the Afghan government. The Basmachi rebels used parts of Afghanistan as a safe haven until the Bolshevik Revolution of 1917, when Vladimir Lenin and other communist party leaders made efforts to gain support from the considerable Muslim population of their country. In the wake of World War I, the Bolsheviks were occupied with the Russian Civil War and other domestic issues, so Russia appeared less threatening than British imperialism. In 1919, war broke out for the third time in the Third Anglo-Afghan War with an Afghan invasion of British India. Soviet Russia indirectly supported Afghanistan after the war by becoming the first country to establish diplomatic relations with them in 1919, and recognizing their borders. Following renewed anti-British sentiment after the Anglo-Afghan War, a non-aggression pact between Afghanistan and the Soviet Union was formalized in 1921. The treaty provided for Afghan transit rights through the Soviet Union and formed the basis of friendly relations during the 1920s. Early Soviet assistance included financial aid, aircraft and attendant technical personnel, and telegraph operators.

=== Soviet Union ===
Afghanistan–Soviet Union relations
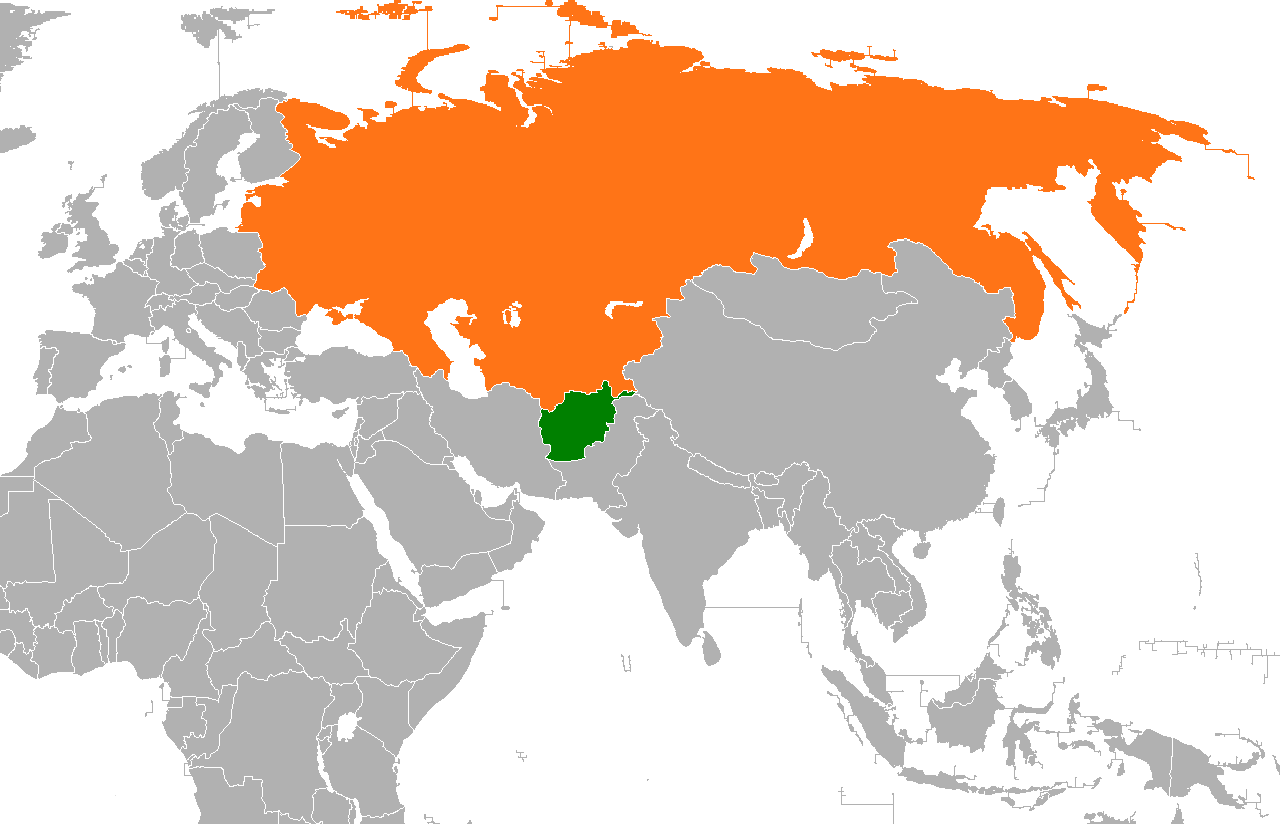

- Afghanistan: Soviet Union

In 1924 and 1925, the Soviet Union and Afghanistan engaged in a conflict over the island of Urtatagai. The conflict ended with a peace treaty wherein the Soviet Union recognized the island as part of Afghanistan, and Afghanistan was forced to restrain Basmachi border raids. In 1929, during the Afghan Civil War (1928–1929), the Saqqawists revoked the treaty upon coming to power. Subsequent Basmachi incursions from northern Afghanistan prompted the beginning of the Red army intervention in Afghanistan, which succeeded at reducing Basmachi offensive capabilities. A small Basmachi resurgence in late 1929 and early 1930 prompted a second intervention.

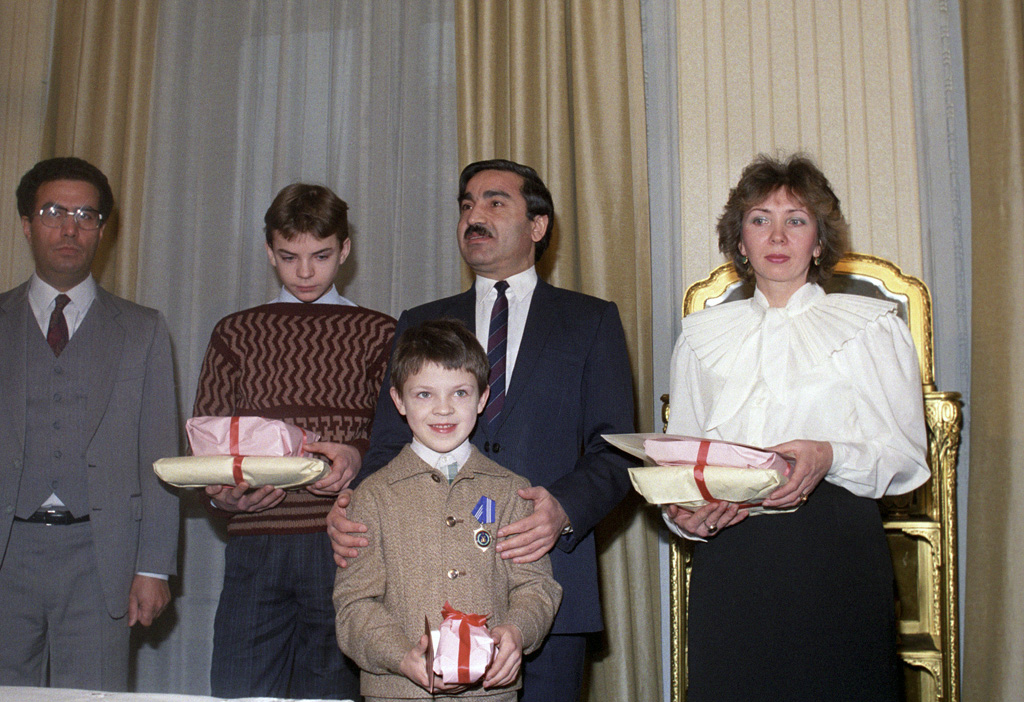
A group of Afghan and Soviet people in Moscow, c. 1991.

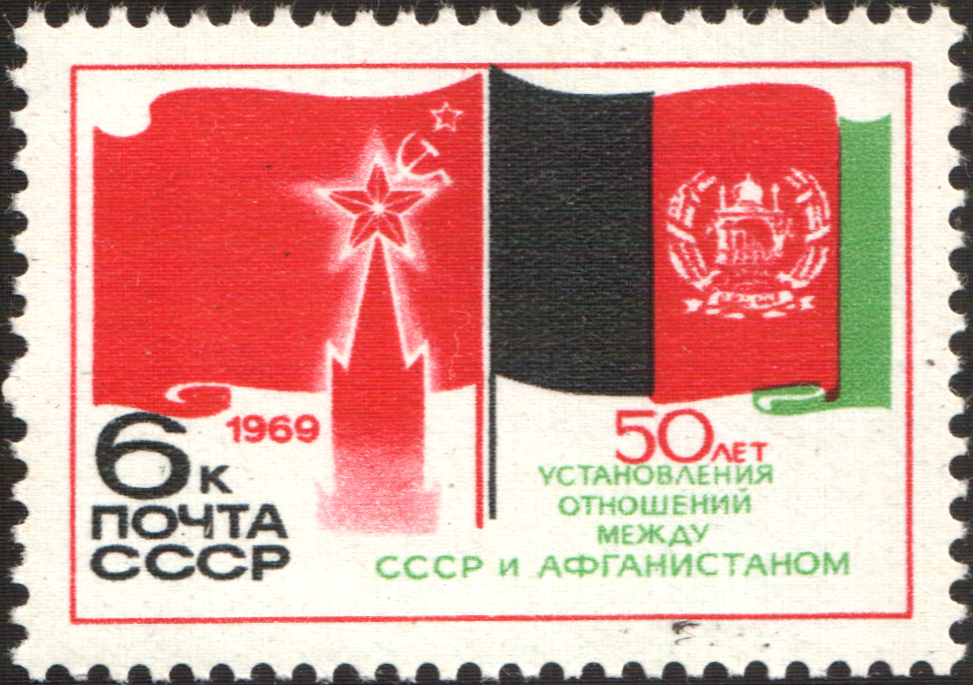
A 1969 Soviet postage stamp in honor of 50 years of USSR-Afghanistan relations

The Cold War lasted from 1946 to 1991. The conflict shaped Soviet foreign policy towards developing countries, emphasizing the creation of puppet, proxy, and buffer states.

Afghanistan's foreign policy after 1919 was one of non-alignment. Despite this policy, the Afghanistan government still retained good terms with both the United States and the Soviet Union. The countries' treaty of neutrality and nonaggression was first signed in 1928. In 1929, Ghulam Nabi served as Afghan ambassador to the Soviet Union, being stationed in Moscow. In a confidential report in 1944 to the India Office, it was reported that fear of Russia was prevalent within the Afghan air force, and a question that was frequently put to British instructors was "when will the British and Americans realise that Russia is a danger to all small countries in Europe and Asia and begin to take action to counter Russian aims in the Balkans, the Mediterranean and the Near East?". Upon being elected Prime Minister, Mohammad Daoud Khan pursued close relations with the Soviet Union. The Soviets began a major economic assistance program in Afghanistan in the 1950s. Afghanistan's strained relations with Pakistan over the Pashtunistan issue, as well as the 1954 military pact between Pakistan and the United States, was another large reason of the closer relations (but whilst maintaining non-alignment).

Between 1954 and 1978, Afghanistan received more than $1 billion in Soviet aid, including substantial military assistance. From 1956, a major arms agreement with the USSR allowed Afghanistan to modernize their army for the first time since World War II. The Afghan king along with the Foreign Minister paid a visit to the Soviet Union in July 1957 and again from 17 August to 4 September 1957. Along with increasing military aid, it was agreed for the Soviets to conduct petroleum exploration in northern Afghanistan. The petroleum exploration initiated from the second half of 1958. An additional deal of economic and technical cooperation between the two countries was signed by Daoud Khan and Nikita Khrushchev in May 1959. The USSR also saw its neighbor as important to its national security. Further petroleum exploration by the Soviet Union in Afghanistan occurred from 1960 to 1963 in Sheberghan, Sar-e-Pul, and Faryab. In 1973, the two countries announced a $200 million assistance agreement on gas and oil development, trade, transport, irrigation, and factory construction.

Despite his earlier close cooperation with the USSR, Daoud Khan led Afghanistan back towards independence and non-alignment as President of the new republic. Additionally, he sent troops as well as diplomats to neighbouring countries to build up foreign relations and decrease Afghanistan's dependence on the Soviet Union, seeking instead closer relations to the west and the United States. On a state visit to the USSR in April 1977, Daoud Khan told Leonid Brezhnev that Afghanistan shall remain free and that the Soviet Union will not be able to dictate how Afghanistan would govern.

Relations between the two countries turned more positive again after the communist party took power in Afghanistan. On 5 December 1978, the two countries signed a 20-year friendship treaty. However relations turned sour again after the assassination of Nur Muhammad Taraki in 1979.

There were four main motivations for the Soviet invasion of Afghanistan in 1979. First, the Soviet belief that Afghanistan had strategic importance for the security of their borders. This belief was consistent with longstanding Russian foreign policy that emphasized security through expansionism and the establishment of physical barriers in the form of buffer states. The second reason for invasion was the possibility of interrupting Chinese and American efforts to establish greater political influence in Afghanistan before Soviet intervention would entail direct confrontation of those two rival powers. The third reason was to enforce the dominance of Marxist–Leninist revolutionary ideals, above the emergent Islamic ideology in Afghanistan. Lastly, the Soviets were aware of the imperial advantages of direct intervention and occupation. In particular, they were interested in securing unfettered access to the raw materials and inexpensive manufactured goods of their smaller neighbour.

Around this time, the Soviets were also experiencing success in influencing affairs in the Middle East, such as the southern part of the Arabian Peninsula. The invasion earned the Soviet Union almost universal condemnation by the international community. The Soviet intervention has also been analysed with the model of the resource curse. The 1979 coup in Iran saw a massive increase in the scarcity and price of oil, adding tens of billions of dollars to the Soviet economy. The oil boom may have overinflated national confidence, serving as a catalyst for the invasion. The Politburo was temporarily relieved of financial constraints and sought to fulfill a long-term geopolitical goal of seizing the lead in the region between Central Asia and the Gulf.

Following the 1979 invasion, the Soviets augmented their large aid commitments to shore up the Afghan economy and modernize the Afghan military. They provided the Karmal regime an unprecedented $800 million. During their 10-year occupation of Afghanistan, the Soviets established 100 gas wells, and pipelines that shipped fuel into Soviet Central Asia.

The Soviet Union supported the Najibullah regime even after the withdrawal of Soviet troops in February 1989. Today, unresolved questions concerning Soviet MIA/POWs in Afghanistan remain an issue between Russia and Afghanistan.

=== Russian Federation (1990–2021) ===
Under Boris Yeltsin all aid to the Najibullah regime was cut causing newly independent Tajikistan, Uzbekistan and Turkmenistan to send food to Afghanistan in an effort to save the regime. The cut of Russian exports led to an inability to equip and provide the large pro government militias and army with what they needed causing loyalty to waver and eventually leading to Najibullah's overthrow in April 1992.

During the Afghan Civil War (1992-96), the Soviet House of Science and Culture in west Kabul was destroyed during fighting between rival factions.

In 1993, Tajik rebels based in Afghanistan attacked a Russian border outpost in Tajikistan amid the Tajikistani Civil War, killing 25 Russians and prompting Russian retaliatory strikes, which caused extensive damage in northern Afghanistan. Reports of Afghan support for the rebels, part of the United Tajik Opposition against the Dushanbe government, led to cool relations between Russia and Afghanistan.

Russia became increasingly disenchanted with the Taliban over their support for Chechen rebels and for providing a sanctuary for terrorist groups active in Central Asia and in Russia itself. Russia provided military assistance to the Afghan Northern Alliance, who eventually proved to be a major force in the efforts to overthrow the Taliban regime following United States intervention in 2001.

In 2003 the Russian government listed the Taliban as a terrorist organization.

In October 2005, Russian defence officials stated they would be giving helicopters and other military equipment to Afghanistan's army worth $30 million USD.

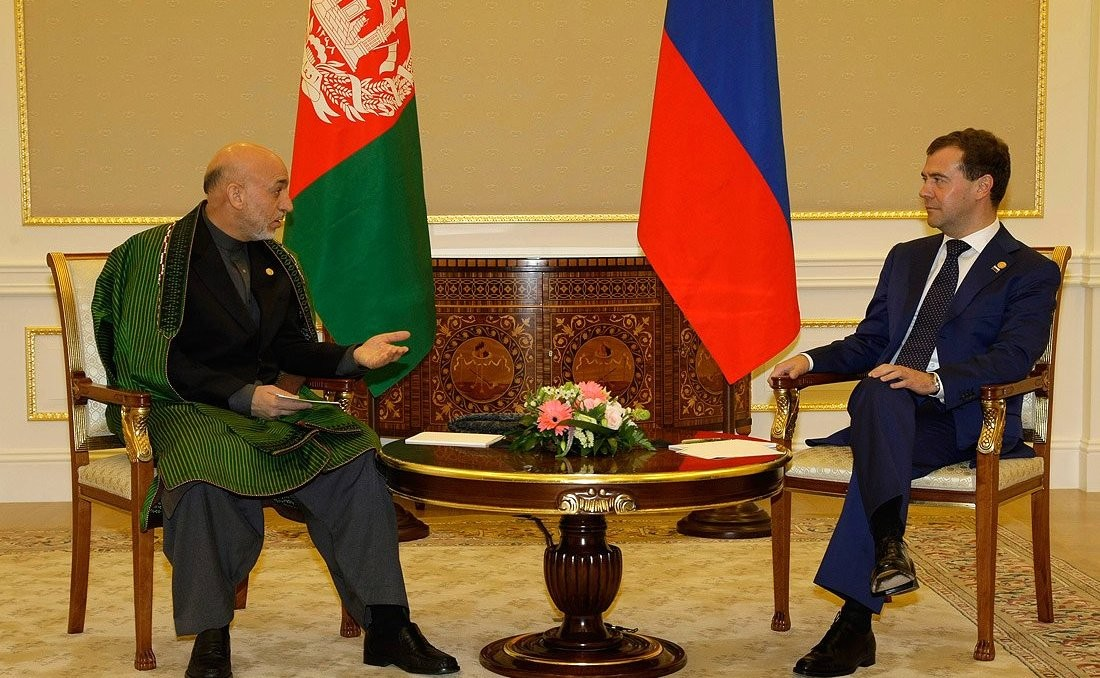
Hamid Karzai and Dmitry Medvedev

In October 2010, Afghan President Hamid Karzai reprimanded Russia after its forces entered the country without permission. He also stated that Russia has "violated Afghan sovereignty" in a joint mission with United States agents.

However, after Russia's relations with the West soured following the start of the Russo-Ukrainian War, Moscow decided to become active and expand its role in Afghanistan, according to Omar Nassar, the director of the Moscow-based Center for Contemporary Afghan Studies (CISA). In March 2014, after the annexation of Crimea by the Russian Federation, President Karzai said that "we respect the decision the people of Crimea took through a recent referendum that considers Crimea as part of the Russian Federation". A spokesman later added that this represented Afghanistan's official recognition of the new Russia–Ukraine border. The New York Times noted that Afghanistan was "the first Western-backed democracy" to show support for the annexation. Afghanistan was the third country overall to recognize it, after Syria and Venezuela. Karzai's chief of staff, Karim Khoram, told Radio Free Afghanistan that "Historically, this region was part of Russia. Now that its people have expressed their will, we respect it."

Russia's more active involvement in Afghanistan includes business investment proposals, diplomatic propaganda, cultural programs, financial and military support for the central government, power influence in the north and with the Taliban. Since 2016, it has provided the Afghan government with tens of thousands of Kalashnikov rifles and millions of rounds of ammunition. Moscow has already launched several efforts at diplomacy. Between December 2016 and April 2017, Russia hosted three rounds of talks involving China, Iran, and Pakistan. In the third round, it included Afghanistan, as well.

In 2017, a new Russian cultural center was built and (re-)opened in Kabul's Darulaman Road, on the same site as the former Soviet-era House of Science and Culture which was built in 1982 and damaged by war in the 1990s.

A ceremony was held in Moscow on 28 May 2019 marking the 100th anniversary of diplomatic relations. It was followed by talks between Afghan politicians and a Taliban delegation in an effort to form peace in the Taliban insurgency in Afghanistan.

=== Taliban return to power (2021–present) ===
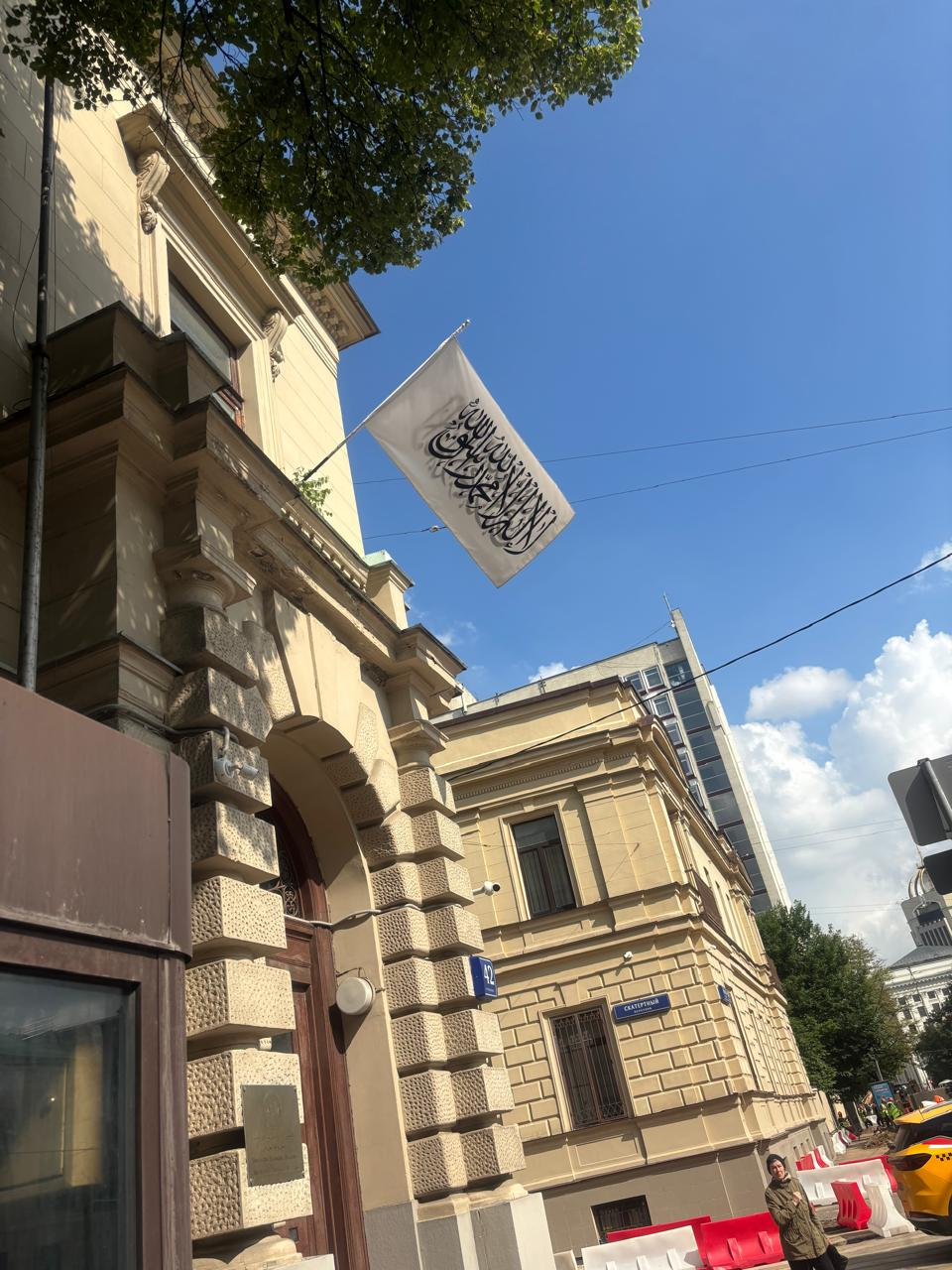
Flag of the Islamic Emirate of Afghanistan at Afghan Embassy in Moscow

Russia's reaction to the Taliban takeover of Afghanistan in August 2021 was pragmatic and restrained. Russia, like most other states, did not formally recognize the Taliban regime or even remove Taliban from its list of terrorist organizations; however, the Russian embassy in Kabul expressed early readiness to interact with the new de facto authorities.

On 9 April 2022, the Russian Ministry of Foreign Affairs accredited Taliban appointee Jamal Nasir Gharwal as charge d'affaires of the Afghan Embassy in Moscow.

The Russian embassy is one of only a handful to remain open in Kabul; in September 2022 Taliban government signed a provisional agreement with Russia to import petroleum products and wheat at a discount.

On 28 May 2024 Russian foreign minister Sergei Lavrov said that Russia would soon remove the Taliban from their list of state sponsors of terrorism; this would lead to the full normalization of relations. The Taliban were invited to the June 2024 St. Petersburg International Economic Forum.

On 3 July 2025, Russia officially became the first country in the world to recognize Islamic Emirate of Afghanistan, and the Taliban as the government of Afghanistan. On 16 January 2026, the Russian government formally accepted the credentials of Gul Hasan, the Taliban-appointed ambassador to Moscow, granting him official diplomatic status.

On 27 May 2026, Russia and Afghanistan signed a military cooperation agreement. The details of the agreement were unknown; however, Mullah Yaqoob stated that it marked an expansion of the ties between the two countries, mentioning Afghanistan's interest in furthering interaction with Russia after a meeting with Sergei Shoigu.
