= St Mark's, Teddington =

Coordinates: 51.4211°N 0.3209°W

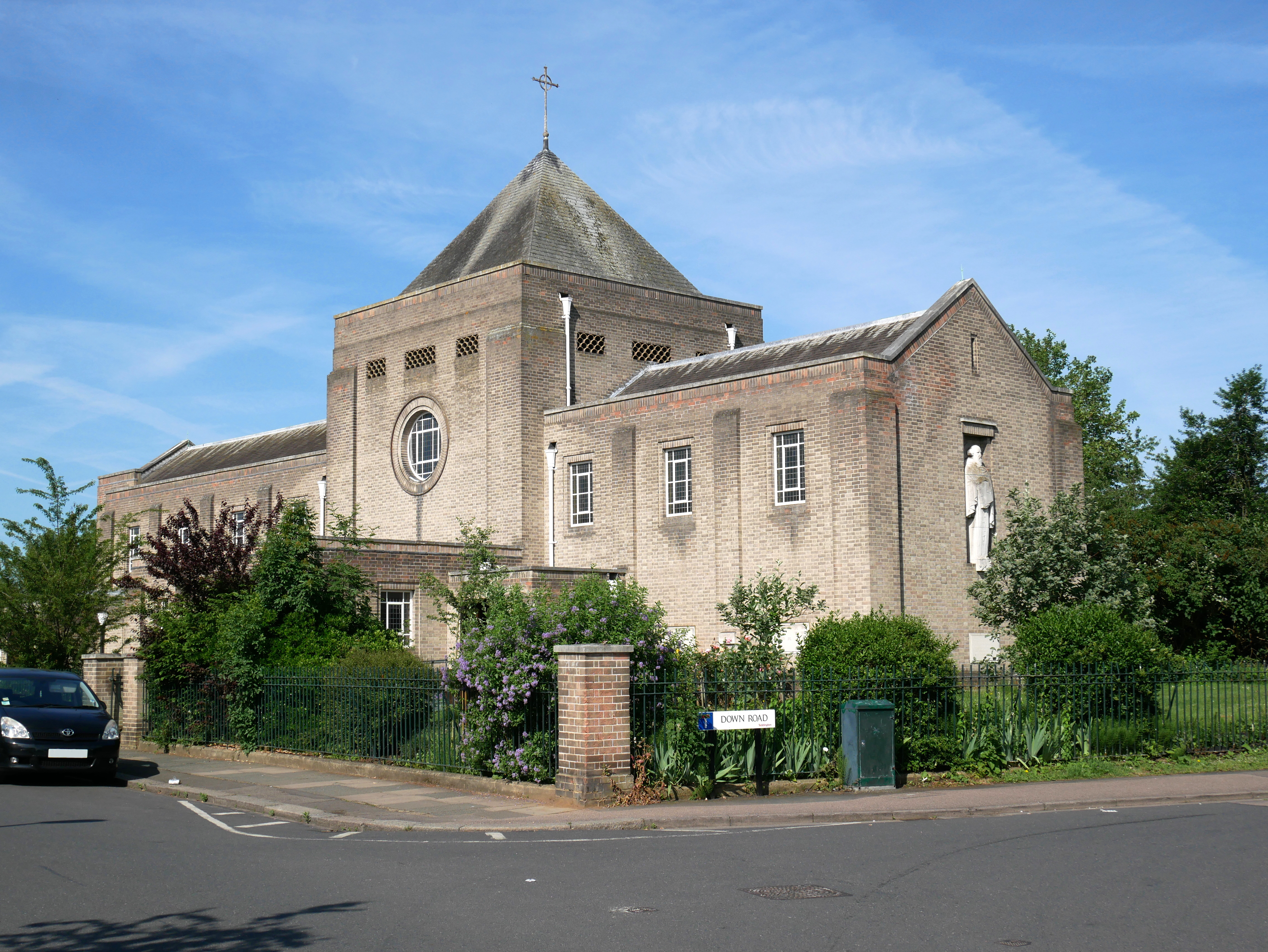
- St Mark's, Teddington
- Location: Teddington, London
- Country: England
- Denomination: Anglican
- Website: https://stmarksteddington.org/home

History
- Status: Parish church
- Consecrated: 28 June 1939

Architecture
- Functional status: Active
- Architect: Cyril Farey

Administration
- Province: Canterbury
- Diocese: Diocese of London
- Archdeaconry: Middlesex
- Deanery: Hampton

Clergy
- Bishop(s): The Rt Revd and Rt Hon Dame Sarah Mullally DBE
- Vicar: Revd Jerry Field

St Mark's, Teddington, the parish church of South Teddington and Hampton Wick, is a Church of England church. It is located on St Mark's Road, Teddington in the London Borough of Richmond upon Thames. The current building dates from 1939 and was designed by architect Cyril Farey.

In 2024, St Mark's Teddington partnered with St John's Hampton Wick. They are both moving towards a shared vision, uniquely expressed in each location.

Rev Jerry Field is now the Vicar of both St Mark’s Teddington and St John’s Hampton Wick. Rev Tom Simpson is Minister-in-Charge at St Mark’s Teddington whilst remaining part of the team at St John’s Hampton Wick
