= Ponizovsky House =

Building of the Embassy of Afghanistan in Moscow, Russia

Embassy of Afghanistan in Moscow Посольство Афганистана в Москве
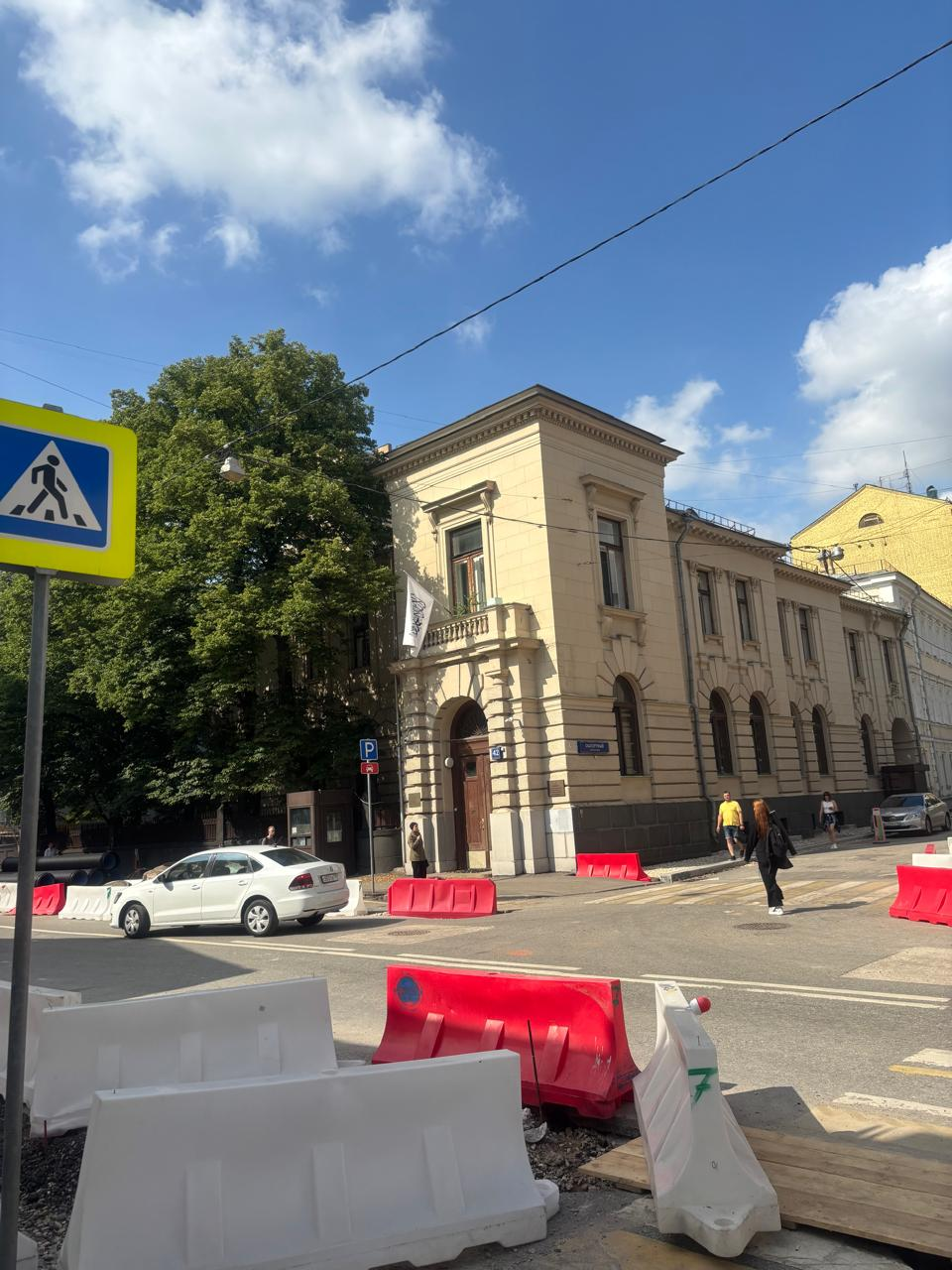
- Embassy of Afghanistan in 2025
- Location: Moscow
- Address: 42 Povarskaya Street
- Coordinates: 55°45′24″N 37°35′21″E
- Ambassador: Gul Hassan

The Embassy of Afghanistan in Moscow (Persian: سفارت کبرای امارت اسلامی افغانستان در مسكو/ Pashto:په مسکو کې د افغانستان د اسلامي امارت لوی سفارت) is the diplomatic mission of the Islamic Emirate of Afghanistan to the Russian Federation. It is located at 42 Povarskaya Street (Russian: Поварская ул., 42) in the Arbat district of Moscow. Following the fall of the country to the Taliban in August 2021, the embassy remained in operation as a representative of the Islamic Republic, until the Russian Ministry of Foreign Affairs accredited Taliban diplomats and transferred the embassy in 9 April 2022. Since June 2025, Gul Hassan has served as the first permanent ambassador appointed by the Taliban and accredited by Russia.

The mission is housed in the historical Ponizovsky House, designed by Lev Kekushev, although its exterior was later radically altered and no longer displays signs of Kekushev's Art Nouveau style.

In 1902 Jacob Reck's development company purchased a large Volchkov estate, split it in two lots, and invited Kekushev to design two luxury mansions for resale. The better known Mindovsky House (present-day Embassy of New Zealand) was set right on the street corner, with the main entrance facing the spacious inner courtyard. Ponizovsky House was set back from Povarskaya street line, allowing a narrow strip of garden between the wall and sidewalk; its main entrance faces the corner of Povarskaya Street and Skatertny Lane. Period photographs show that the building had a flattened yet prominent dome above the main entrance and a smaller curvilinear gable above Povarskaya street facade; overall styling was reserved, with clear vertical lines of windows cut through a tiled wall. In 1914, when Kekushev was already inactive, Ponizovsky House was rebuilt to a neoclassical design, losing the dome and all original exterior finishes.

== Gallery ==
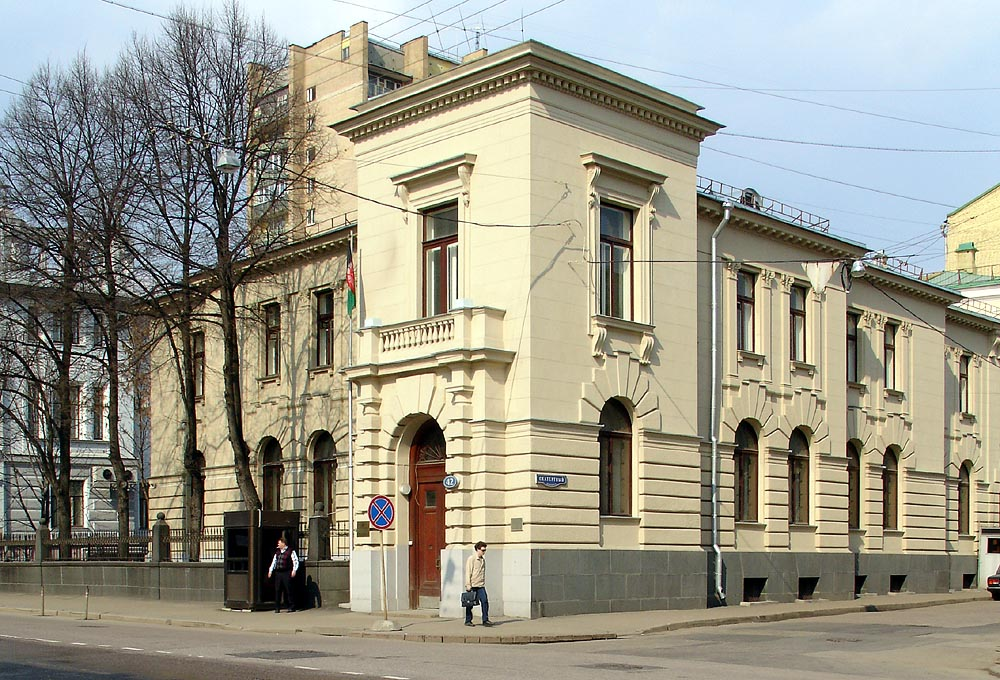
Embassy of Islamic Republic of Afghanistan

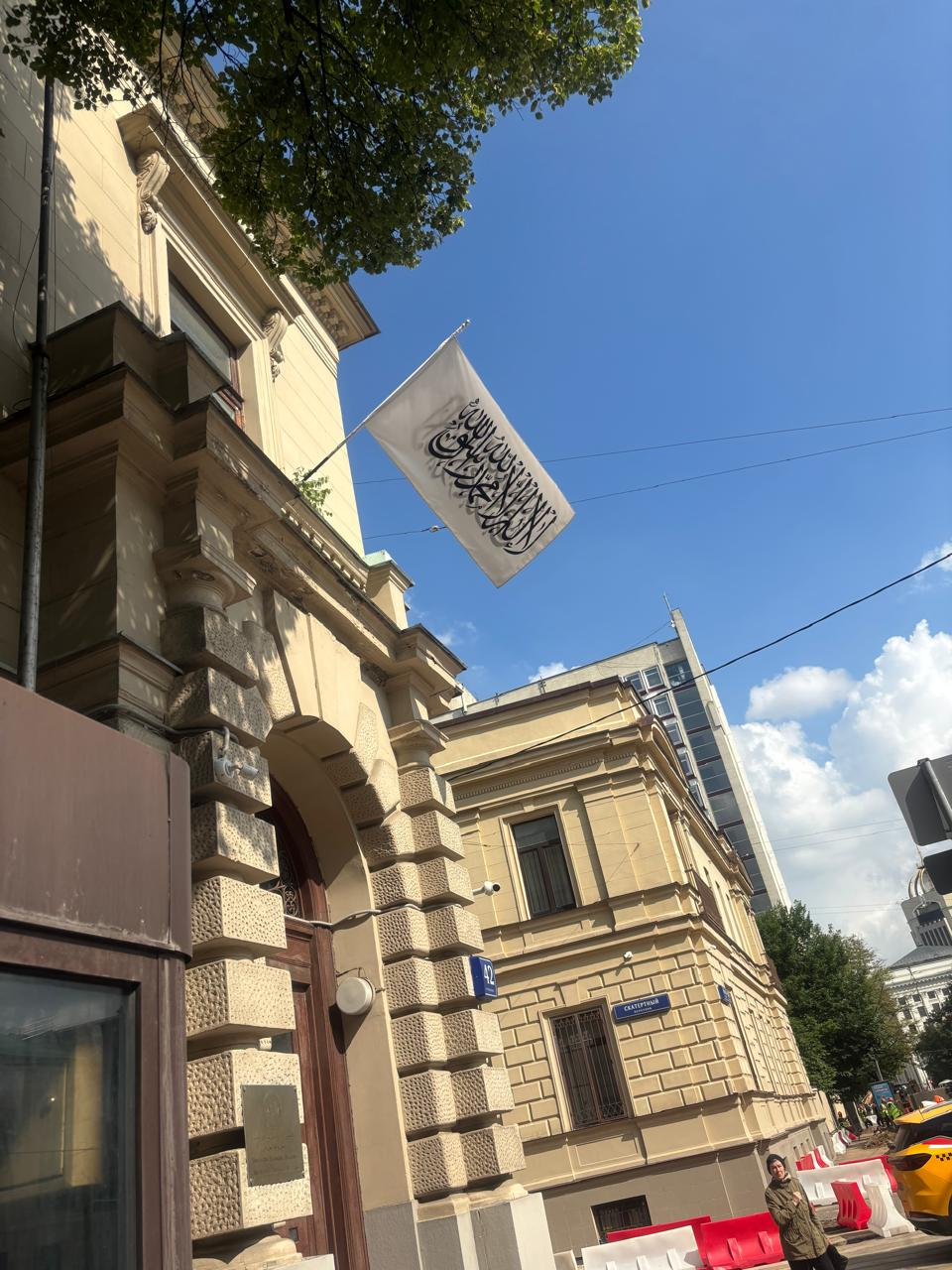
Flag of Islamic Emirate of Afghanistan

== See also ==
- Afghanistan–Russia relations
- Diplomatic missions in Russia
