= William Walcot =

Russian-Scottish architect and graphic artist (1874–1943)

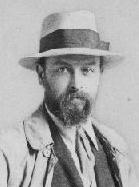
- Born: 10 March 1874; Lustdorf, Russian Empire
- Died: 21 May 1943 (aged 69); Hurstpierpoint, Sussex, England
- Occupation: Architect
- Buildings: Metropol Hotel, Gutheil and Yakunchikova mansions (all in Moscow, Russia)

William Walcot RE (Russian: Вильям Францевич Валькот, romanized: Vilyam Frantsevich Valkot; 10 March 1874 – 21 May 1943) was a Russian-Scottish architect, graphic artist and etcher, notable as an architect of refined Art Nouveau (Style Moderne) in Moscow, Russia. His trademark "Lady's Head" keystone ornament became the easily recognisable symbol of Russian Style Moderne.

His career to a great extent falls into two halves: up to 1906 he worked as an architect in Russia, mainly in Moscow. Then in 1906 he moved to London, working initially as an architectural draftsman, but from the 1920s also finding considerable success as a printmaker in etching, still mostly on architectural subject matter. He represents one of the leading members of the final phase of the Etching Revival, in a boom which largely collapsed after the Great Crash of 1929.

== Biography ==
=== Russia ===
William Walcot was born in the village of Lustdorf, near Odessa in a mixed Scottish-Russian family. His mother was Russian, from a wealthy family. He grew up in Western Europe and South Africa, returning to Russia at the age of 17, and studied arts and architecture under Leon Benois at the Imperial Academy of Arts in Saint Petersburg. Later, he attended art schools in Paris. Walcot's career as an architect in Moscow lasted only six years, but he managed to leave a lasting heritage of refined, pure Art Nouveau. Unlike contemporary architects like Fyodor Schechtel, Walcot never ventured into Neo-Gothic or Russian Revival styles – his work is strictly Art Nouveau, in its English Decadent variety (according to contemporary Russian critics).

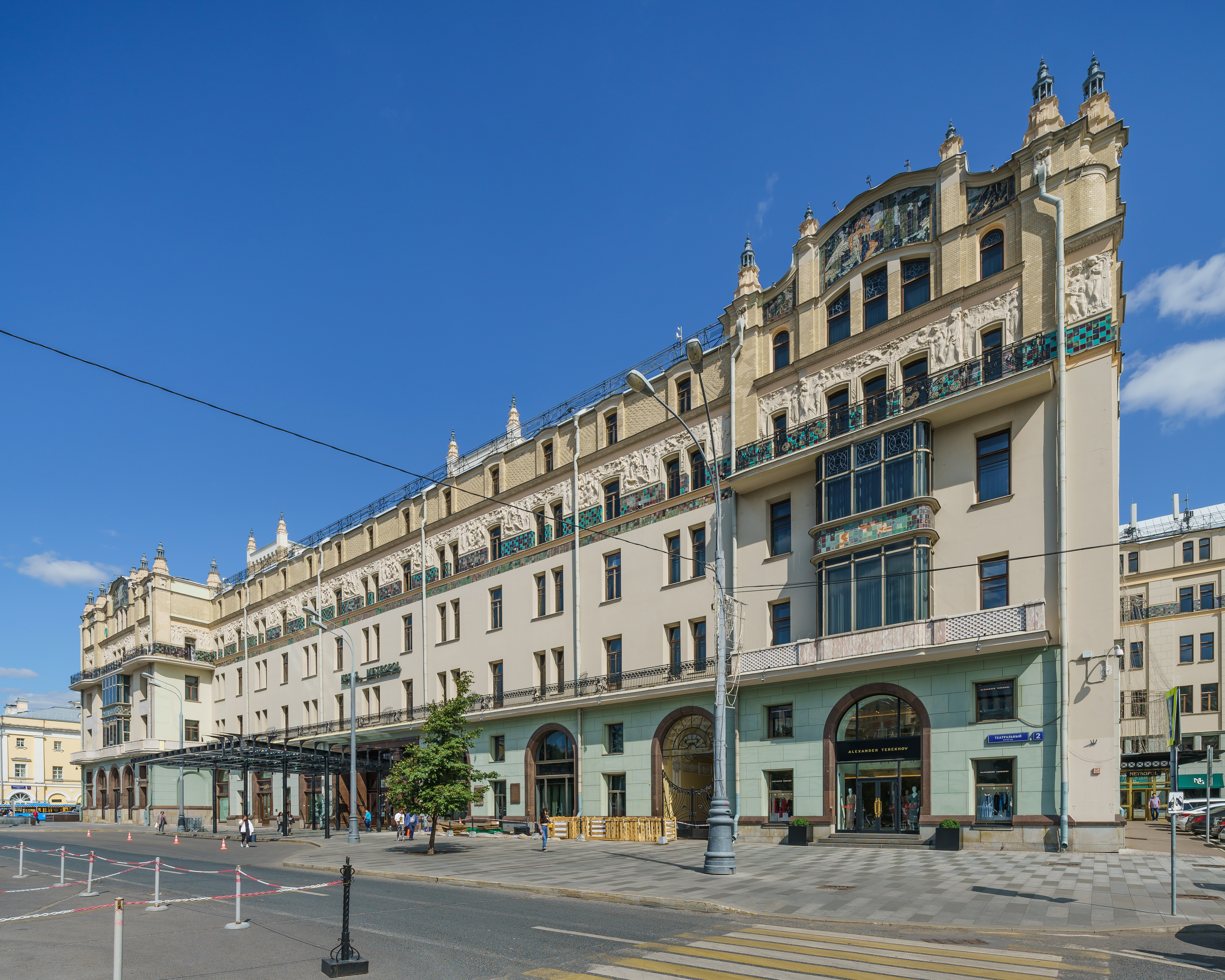
Hotel Metropol

His largest and best known work was the Hotel Metropol in Moscow, financed by Savva Mamontov. The spacious building, now operating as a hotel only, was conceived as a cultural center around Private Opera hall. In 1899, Walcot applied to the open contest with a draft codenamed A Lady's Head (Женская головка), earning the fourth prize and losing to Lev Kekushev. However, Mamontov discarded the professional jury decision, and awarded the design to Walcot (Lev Kekushev later joined the team as project manager). More than once, Walcot's original plans were changed in the process; in fact, there is little in common between the extant building and his 1899 draft (Brumfield, fig.56) – but the Lady's Head persisted in the main hall ornaments. The building, completed in 1905 after a devastating fire in 1901, was decorated by Mikhail Vrubel, Alexander Golovin, Nikolai Andreev and other artists. Participation of Victor Vesnin and Fyodor Schechtel, suggested by William Brumfield, has not been confirmed.

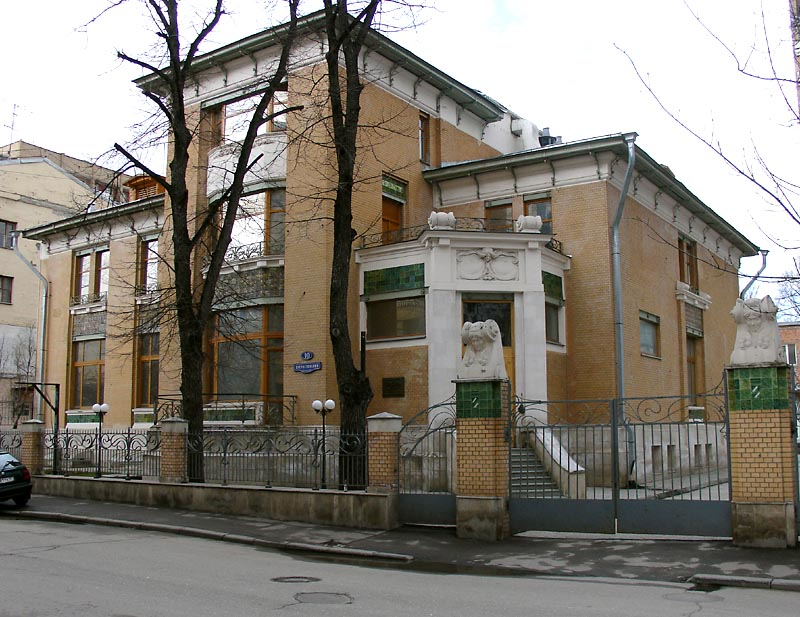
Yakunchikova House, 1899–1900. Three Lady's Heads by the entrance

Lady's Head became Walcot's trademark, repeated in his later works (usually in place of an arch keystone), and frequently imitated by local craftsmen. For a while, he enjoyed an unprecedented flow of inquiries and secured two high-profile commissions of his own choice. These buildings, soon occupied by foreign embassies, are well maintained and retain most of their original interiors:

- 1899–1900 Yakunchikova House (Prechistensky lane, 10)
- 1902–1903 Gutheil House (Prechistensky lane, 8, Embassy of Morocco)

Walcot's mosaic, signed W.W., adorns the List House in Glazovsky Lane, built by Lev Kekushev.

Walcot's 1902 draft for the Lutheran Cathedral in Moscow won the contest, but the cathedral was eventually built to another architect's design. Walcot published various drafts in architectural magazines, influencing many local architects (Brumfield, fig.58).

In 1904, Walcot lost the contest for the Polytechnical Society Building in Myasnitskaya Street to Adolph Mincus; the building, completed in 1905–1907 by Alexander Kuznetsov (1874–1954), bears some details from Walcot's rejected draft.

=== United Kingdom ===
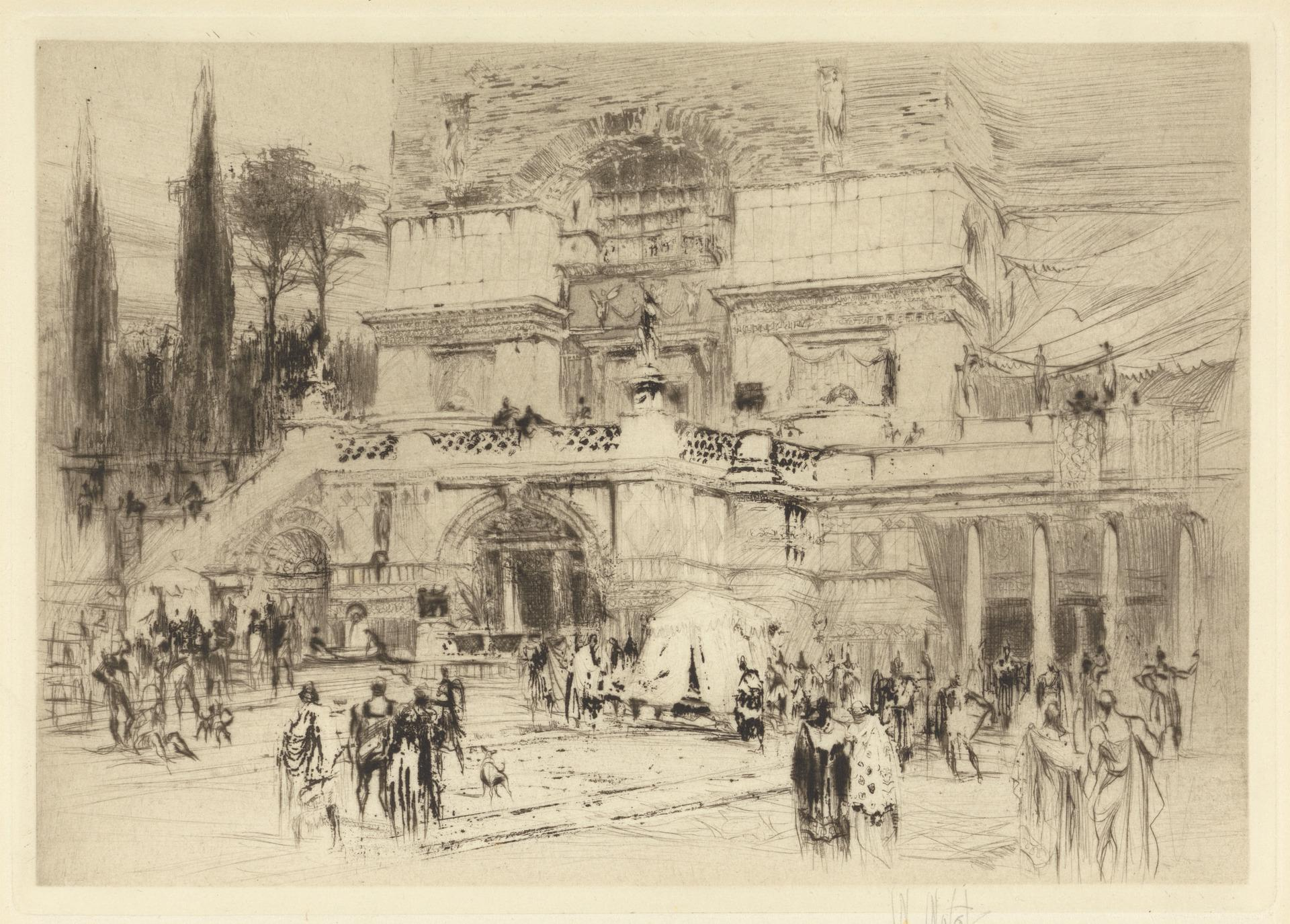
Villa Quintillii, etching, drypoint, & aquatint, 1921, 181 x 254 mm

In 1906, Walcot relocated to London. There he was initially employed as a draughtsman for the South African architect Eustace Frere. He rarely returned to practical construction, designing only one London building: 61 St James's Street (1933). Rather, Walcot worked as an architectural draftsman, famous for his artistic presentation of other architects' designs, and developing as a watercolour painter and printmaker of architectural subjects, exhibiting his own work at the Royal Academy summer exhibitions.

Walcot, along with his contemporary Cyril Farey, was one of the most sought after English architectural illustrators of the 1920s and 30s. Walcot developed his own impressionistic style in gouache and watercolour which won numerous commissions from Edwin Lutyens, Herbert Baker and Aston Webb.

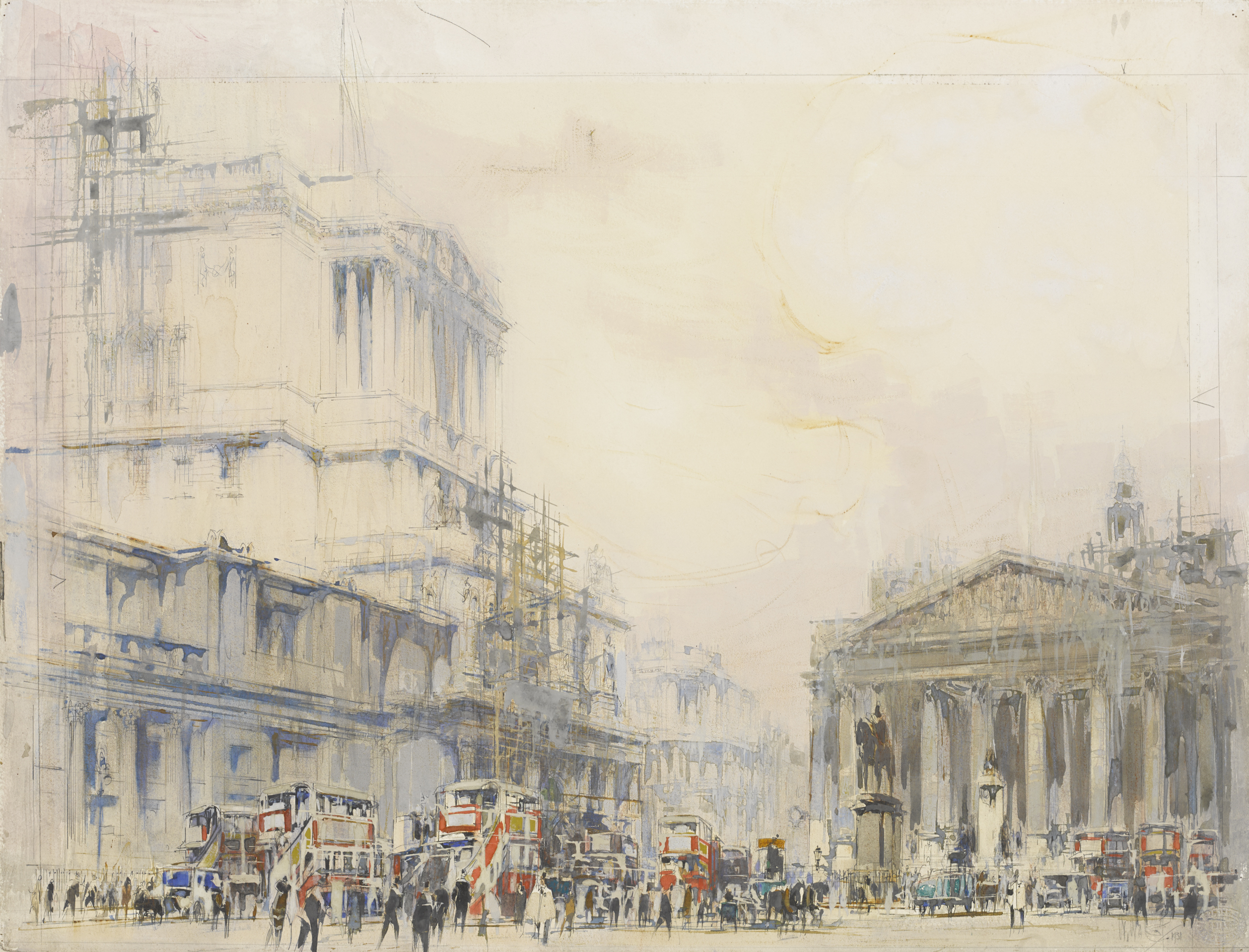
The Bank of England, watercolour, 1931, 507 x 666 mm

He had five exhibitions at the Fine Arts Society, from 1909 to 1914. The first four were called "Watercolours of London & Venice" (1909) and so on, but all appear to have contained some etchings, and the last, in 1914, was called "Etchings by William Walcot", and from this time onwards, most of his output was etchings. But later exhibitions included paintings as well.

A folio of his work was published in 1919 as Architectural Watercolours and Etchings of William Walcot. He was elected to the Royal Society of British Artists in 1913, as an associate of the Royal Society of Painter-Etchers and Engravers in 1916 and a Fellow of the RIBA in 1922. He was also an associate of the British School at Rome, where he had a studio, and kept in close touch with the developing archaeology of the city.

His etching style was apparently influenced by his great friend Frank Brangwyn. Both used unusually large plates for the period, and for large prints, of zinc rather than copper. He also used drypoint and aquatint for some effects. His later prints were often smaller, done on copper plates, and became more free in style, leaving figures with no feet. His edition sizes were 50 to 100 before 1918, but rose to 400 in the boom of the 1920s. In the early 1920s his prices ranged from 5 to 12 guineas, apparently largely depending on size, and sometimes the attractiveness of the subject. Typically for the period, he did not sign in the plate, but in pencil below it, without any numbering.

His etchings included many street scenes showing the monumental centre of London, and a number of recreations of scenes from Imperial Rome, as well as reconstructions of ancient Greek, Roman, Babylonian and ancient Egyptian buildings. He also etched scenes from various Continental cities, especially Rome and Venice, and from as far away as New York. With some exceptions, his etchings showed grand buildings in their settings.

The etching boom of the 1920s collapsed after the Great Crash of 1929, and Walcot's remaining architectural practice was ruined with the outbreak of World War II, and his poor health. In 1943, Walcot died after a fall from a hospital window, perhaps suicide, at Hurstpierpoint, Sussex. Walcot's painting and etchings are frequently exhibited; his painting palette is preserved at the Royal Institute of British Architects. He had a retrospective exhibition at the Fine Arts Society in 1974. His etchings frequently come up for sale in British auctions, fetching good prices.

== Notes ==
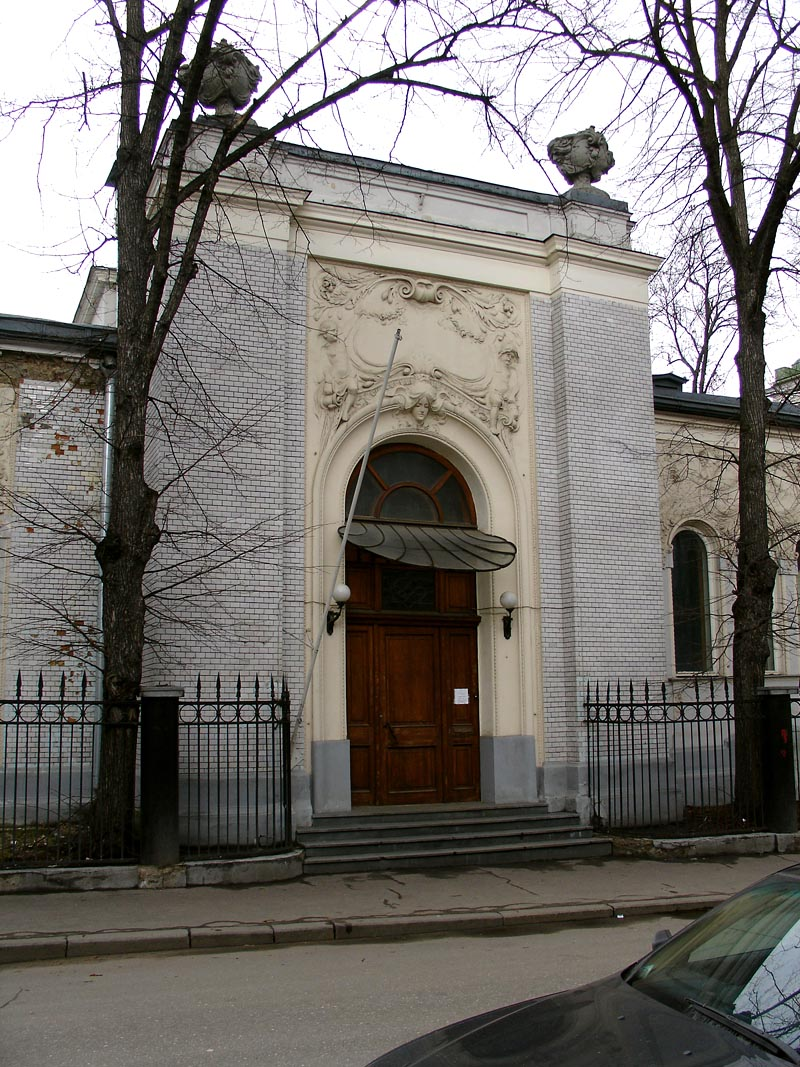
Gutheil House (embassy of Morocco, Moscow), 1902–1903
