= Povarskaya Street =

Street in Moscow, Russia

Coordinates: 55°45′20″N 37°35′27″E

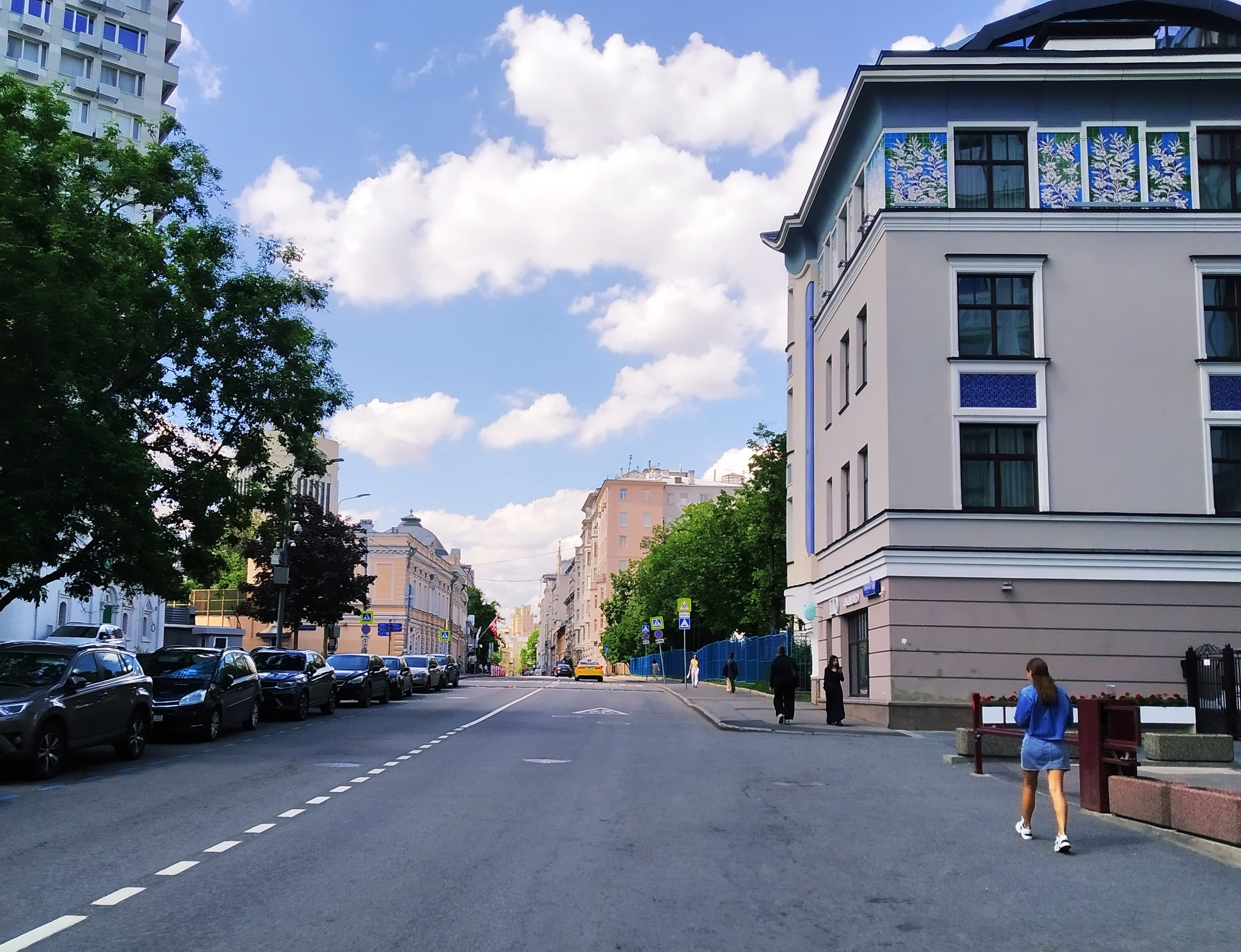
- Native name: Поварская улица (Russian)
- Length: 1 km (0.62 mi)
- Location: Moscow; Central Administrative Okrug; Arbat District; Presnensky District
- Postal code: 121069
- Nearest metro station: Arbatskaya; Barrikadnaya

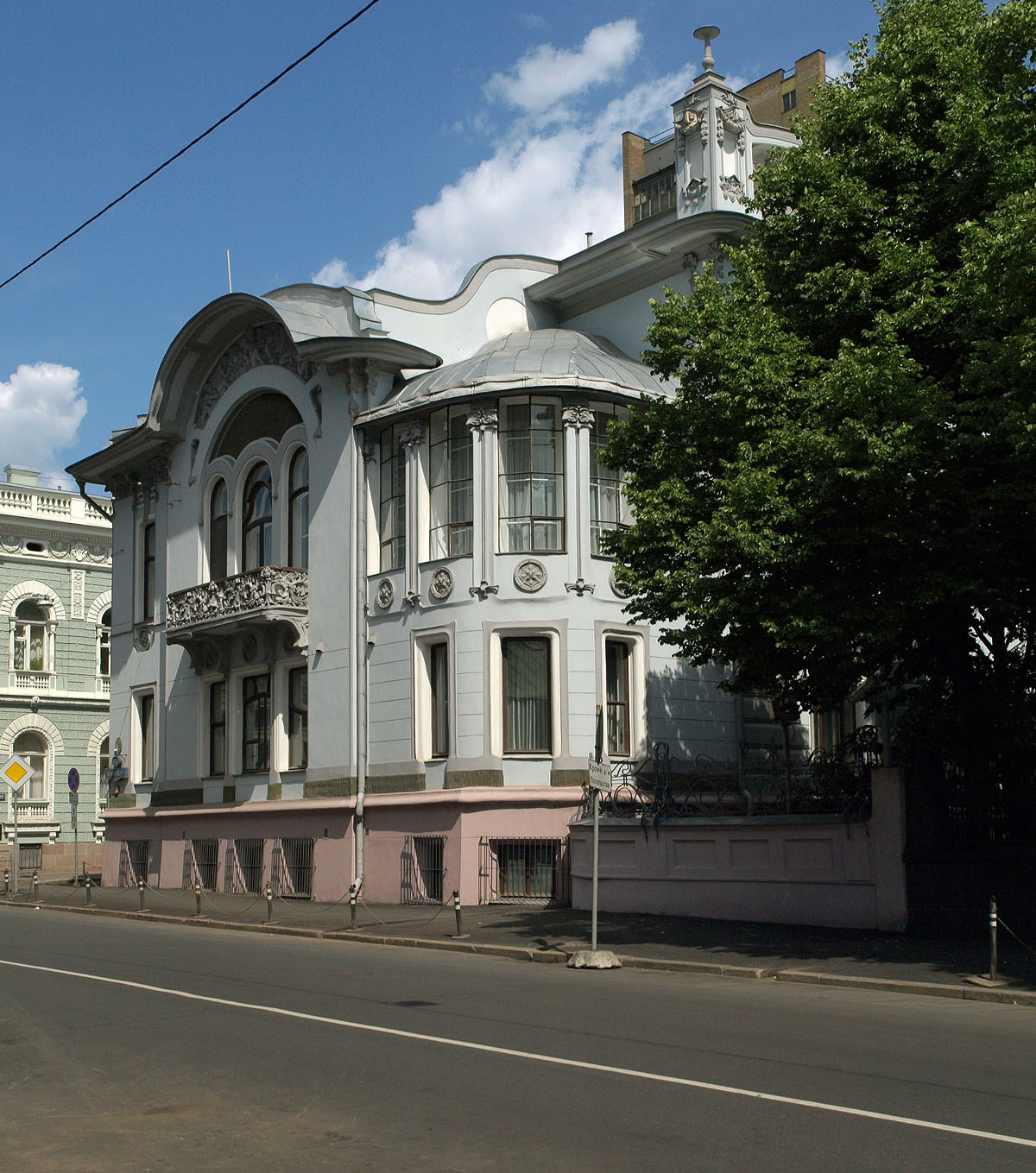
44 Povarskaya, the New Zealand Embassy

Povarskaya Street (Russian: Поварская улица), known from 1924–1991 as Vorovsky Street (улица Воровского), is a radial street in the center of Moscow, Russia, connecting Arbat Square on Boulevard Ring with Kudrinskaya Square on the Garden Ring. It is known informally as Moscow's Embassy Row, and is home to the finest mansions built in the 1890s and 1900s. Povarskaya Street also houses the Supreme Court of Russia and the Gnessin State Musical College.

Most of Povarskaya Street lies in the Arbat District; its northern side near Kudrinskaya Square is administered by the Presnensky District.

== History ==
Povarskaya Street follows the track of an ancient road from Moscow to Volokolamsk. In the 1570s Ivan Grozny allocated the street to oprichnina (private royal domain) and the street was taken over by his associates. In the 17th century, however, its upper-class population was diluted by lower classes. The street owes its name to cooks (povara) of the 17th century Muscovite court. Nearby lanes are also named after various court servants: bakers (Khlebny Lane), tablecloth weavers (Skatertny Lane), etc.

When Peter I established his new capital city in Saint Petersburg, this court sloboda depopulated, and the street was re-settled by nobles again, housing families including Gagarin, Golitsyn, Suvorov and the court of Peter's sister, princess Natalya Alexeevna (1673–1716). The street has retained its upper-class, exclusive role since that time. It is unusually quiet for downtown Moscow - with the exception of music from the Gnesin Institute windows, there are no retail shops, no office blocks and no public transport.

In the late 1890s, real estate developer Jacob Reck consolidated two blocks in the middle of Povarskaya and commissioned prestigious Moscow architects Lev Kekushev and Roman Klein to design exclusive single-family mansions. These buildings, occupied by foreign embassies, are a showcase of Moscow Art Nouveau style.

== Notable buildings ==
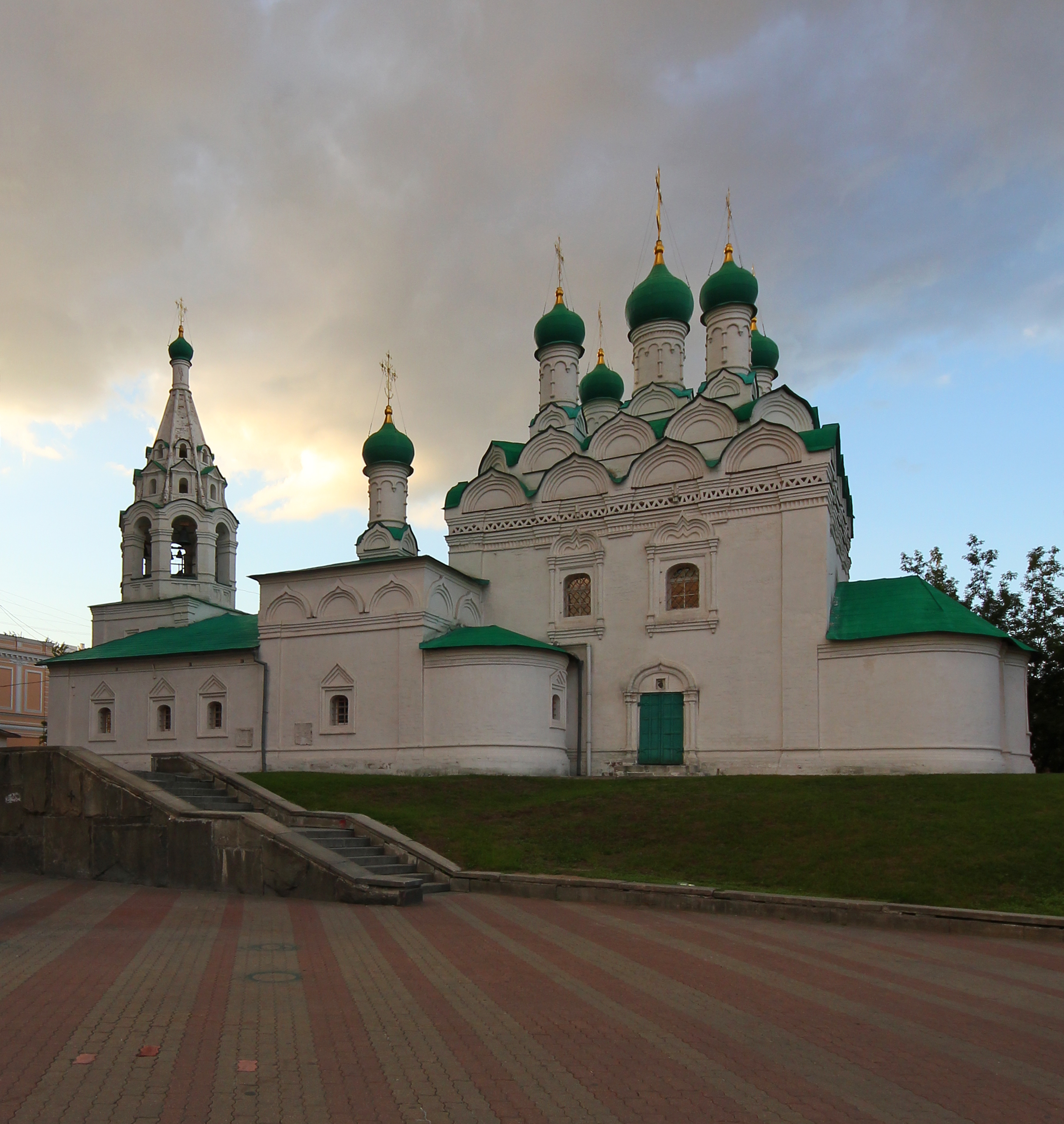
5, Povarskaya, Church of St. Simeon Stylites

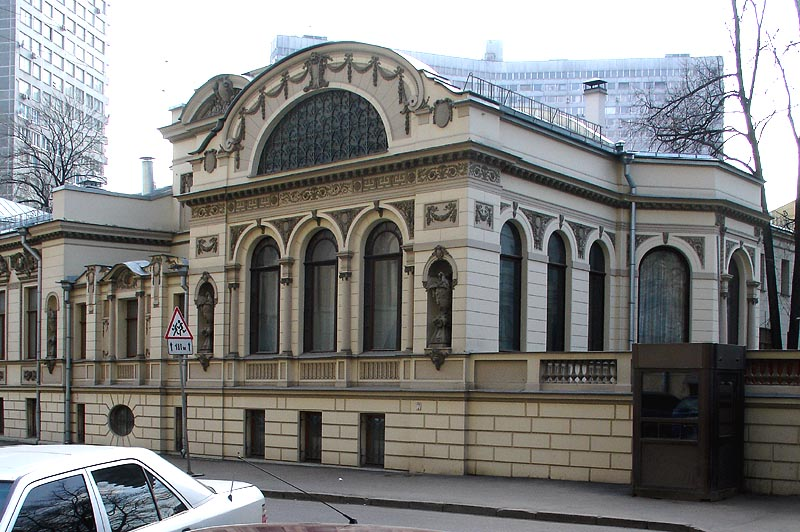
9, Povarskaya, Embassy of Cyprus

- 5 - Church of Saint Simeon Stylites
- 7 - Embassy of Norway by Ivan Kuznetsov and Adolph Seligson
- 9 - Embassy of Cyprus by Ivan Kuznetsov
- 13,15 - Supreme Court of Russia
- 21 - House of Hungarian Culture
- 23,25 - Gagarin house by Domenico Giliardi (World Literature Museum)
- 24 - Art Nouveau building that housed the first Embassy of Lithuania (1920–1940)
- 30 - Shuvalov house by Alexander Kaminsky
- 33 - Cinema Actors' Theater by Victor Vesnin and Alexander Vesnin, 1931
- 32,34,36 - Gnessin State Musical College
- 40 - Embassy of Grenada to the Russian Federation
- 42 - Ponizovsky house by Lev Kekushev (Embassy of Afghanistan)
- 44 - Mindovsky house by Lev Kekushev (Embassy of New Zealand)
- 46 - Schlossberg house by Adolph Seligson
- 50 - Svyatopolk house by Pyotr Boytsov
- 52 - Dolgorukov estate; the basis of the "Rostov Estate" in Tolstoy's War and Peace

== Public transport access ==
- Arbatskaya (Arbatsko-Pokrovskaya Line) - beginning
- Barrikadnaya - end
