= Lev Kekushev =

Russian architect

Lev Nikolayevich Kekushev
- Born: February 19, 1862; Vilnius
- Died: 1916–1919 (?); Moscow (?)
- Occupation: Architect
- Buildings: Mindovsky House; Isakov Apartment Building
- Projects: Completion of Hotel Metropol

Lev Nikolayevich Kekushev (Russian: Лев Николаевич Кекушев) was a Russian architect, notable for his Art Nouveau buildings in Moscow, built in the 1890s and early 1900s in the original, Franco-Belgian variety of this style. Kekushev's buildings are notable for his skillful use of metal ornaments and his signature with a lion (Lev) ornament or sculpture.

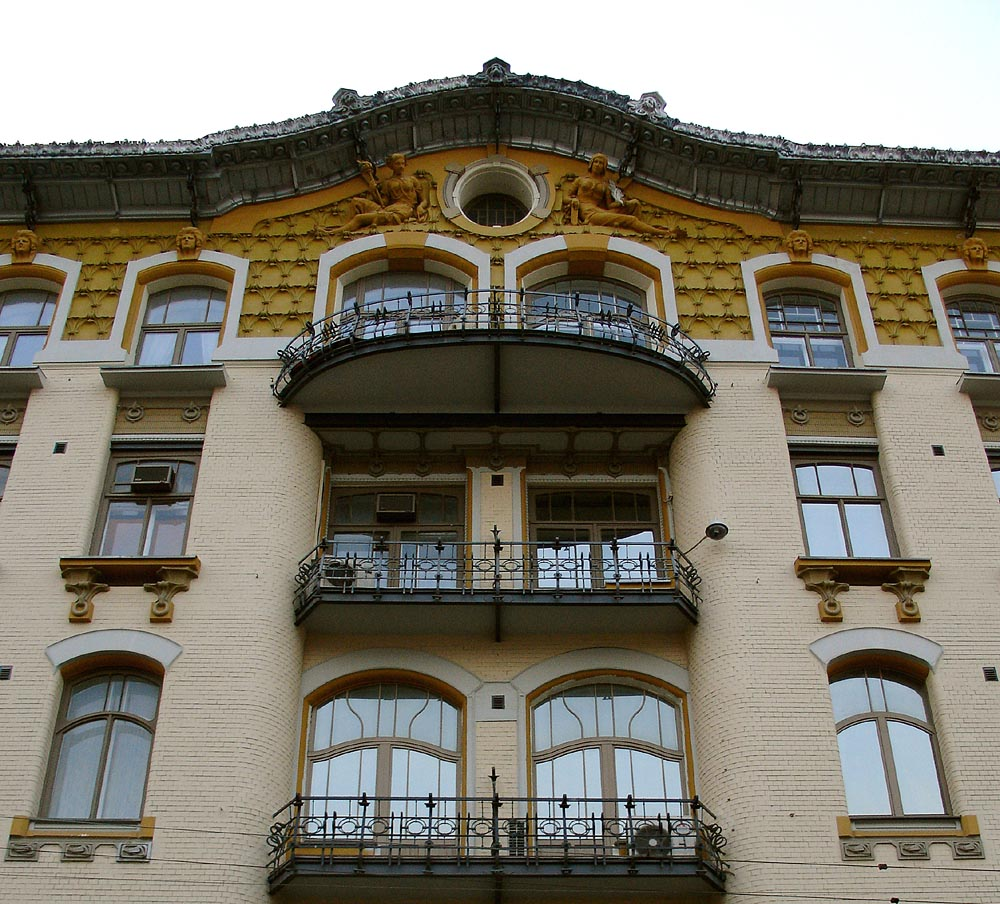
Isakov Apartment Building, 1904-1906

== Biography ==
=== Education ===
Kekushev was born in the family of a Russian officer in Vilnius (Maria Naschokina, p. 253; Simbirsk according to other sources). Kekushev graduated high school in Vilnius, and the Institute of Civil Engineers in Saint Petersburg (1883–1889). For one year, he worked as a state-employed construction engineer in Saint Petersburg, but relocated to Moscow in 1890. At first an assistant to architect Semyon Eybushits, he started independent practice in 1893. At the same time, Kekushev became a master in applied art technologies - iron forging, silver galvanization and chemical frosting of glass. Throughout the 1890s, Kekushev and Illarion Ivanov-Shitz were employed by Moscow-based railway companies and designed dozens of extant railway stations.

=== Art Nouveau ===
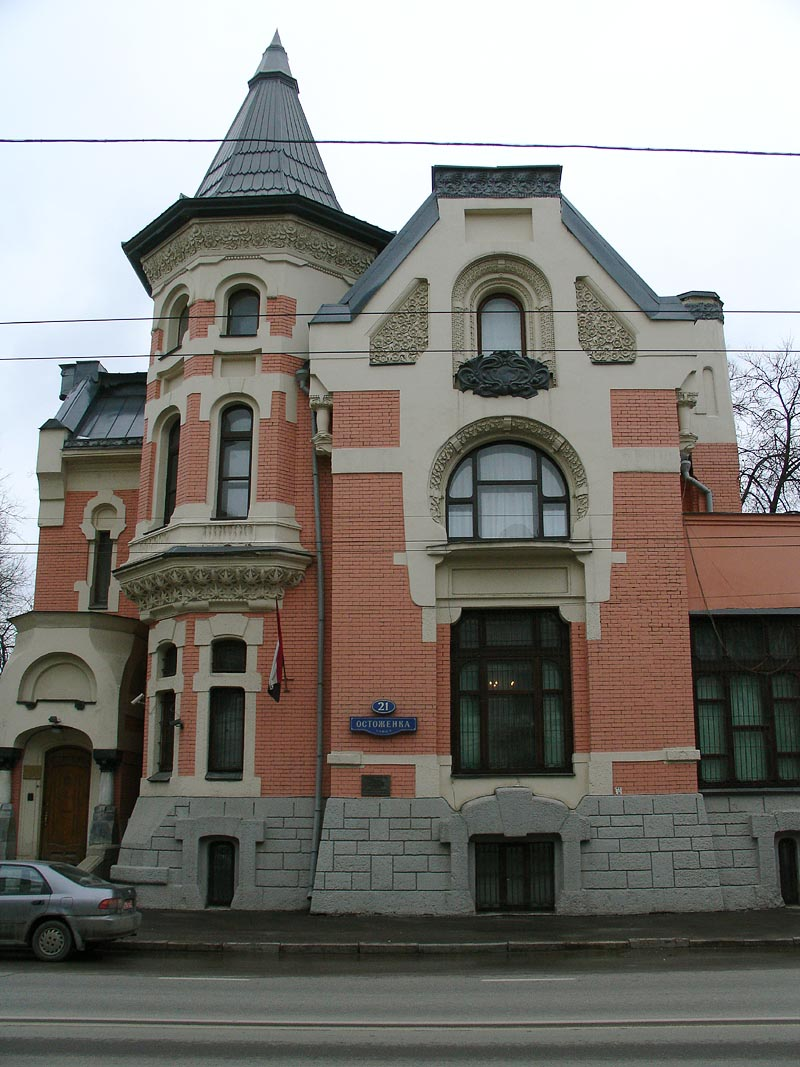
Own house, Ostozhenka Street, 1900–1903, was once crowned with a 3-meter lion statue

Kekushev was the first practitioner of Art Nouveau in Moscow, starting with his apartment buildings in Varsonofyevskay Lane and Bolshaya Dmitrovka, completed 1893. His style (unlike the next generation of Art Nouveau architects like William Walcot and Fyodor Schechtel) is very close to the original Belgian style of Victor Horta. The new wave of architecture was endorsed and financed by prominent business figures like the Khludov and Morozov families and Jacob Reck.

In 1898–1899, Kekushev won the first prize in the open contest for Hotel Metropol; financier Savva Morozov discarded the decision of a professional jury and awarded architectural design to William Walcot. However, the owners retained Kekushev as overall project manager. "None of this (Walcot's earlier) work is on the scale of the Metropole; Kekushev's assistance was probably crucial to the final realization of this complex structure, with its immense dome of glass and iron over an interior court" (Brumfield, chapter 3).

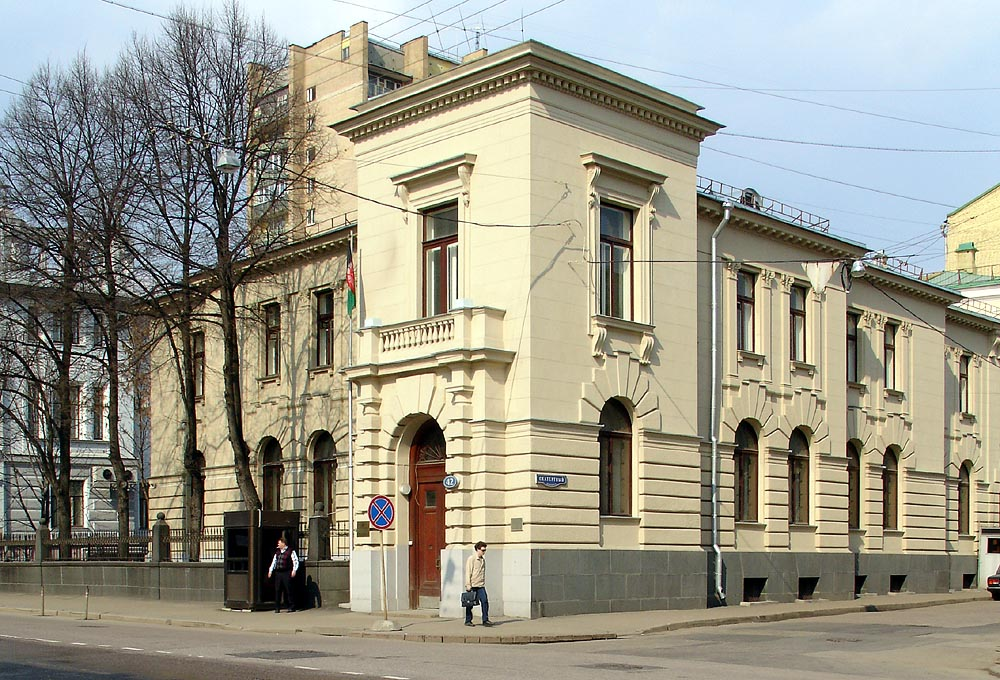
Ponizovsky House, 42 Povarskaya Street, a part of Povarskaya estates built by Jacob Reck company

Kekushev's talent and recognition peaked in 1900–1903, when Art Nouveau, for a while, became the dominant style in Moscow. His buildings include such diverse luxury residences as the timber-framed Nosov House (Electrozavodskaya Street) and stone and steel Mindovsky House (44 Povarskaya Street, now Embassy of New Zealand - a part of a large affluent community developed by Jacob Reck). Kekushev, skilled in interior finishes, practiced Gesamtkunstwerk approach, designing interiors down to the smallest details. Unlike other architects, who commissioned artwork finishes to independent artists, all Kekushev buildings have distinct Kekushev metal ornaments.

=== Withdrawal from practice ===
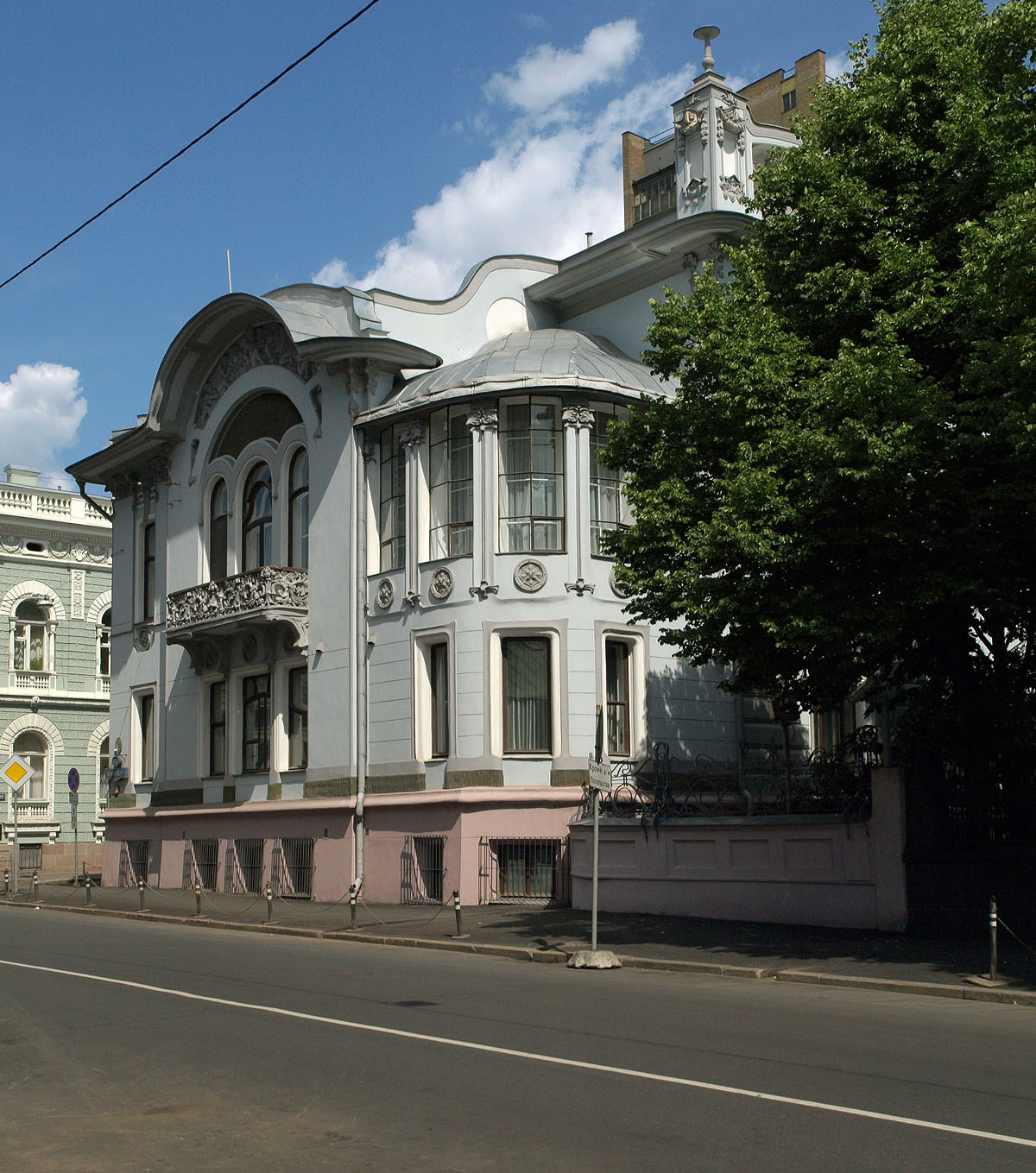
Mindovsky House, 44 Povarskaya Street

After the Russian Revolution of 1905, when public opinion "dismissed Art Nouveau as ephemera of fashion" (Brumfield, chapter 3) in favor of Neoclassical revival, Kekushev was unwilling or unable to change, and worked on low-profile, unimportant projects. By 1912 he practically disappeared from professional scene.

Maria Naschokina, a historian of Art Nouveau, suggested that Kekushev's withdrawal was actually caused by unspecified (probably, mental) illness; this statement has not been thoroughly proved. Kekushev's last years remain a mystery; even the year of his death is disputed (1916 to 1919).

=== Nikolay Kekushev ===
The architect's son, Nikolay Kekushev, was a famous aviator who saw combat in 1924 in Central Asia, later working as aircraft engineer on Arctic flights in the 1920s and 1930s. He was a member of Pavel Golovin's air crew that was the first to reach the North Pole on May 5, 1937, in preparation for Ivan Papanin's polar expedition. During World War II, he flew 59 missions on a DC-3 to and from besieged Leningrad, evacuating starving residents; later, he served on anti-submarine Arctic patrols. In 1948 Nikolay Kekushev was arrested, and he spent six years in Dzhezkazgan labor camps. He survived and wrote a book of memoirs, Zveriada; however, it does not reveal much about his father's last years.

== Selected buildings ==
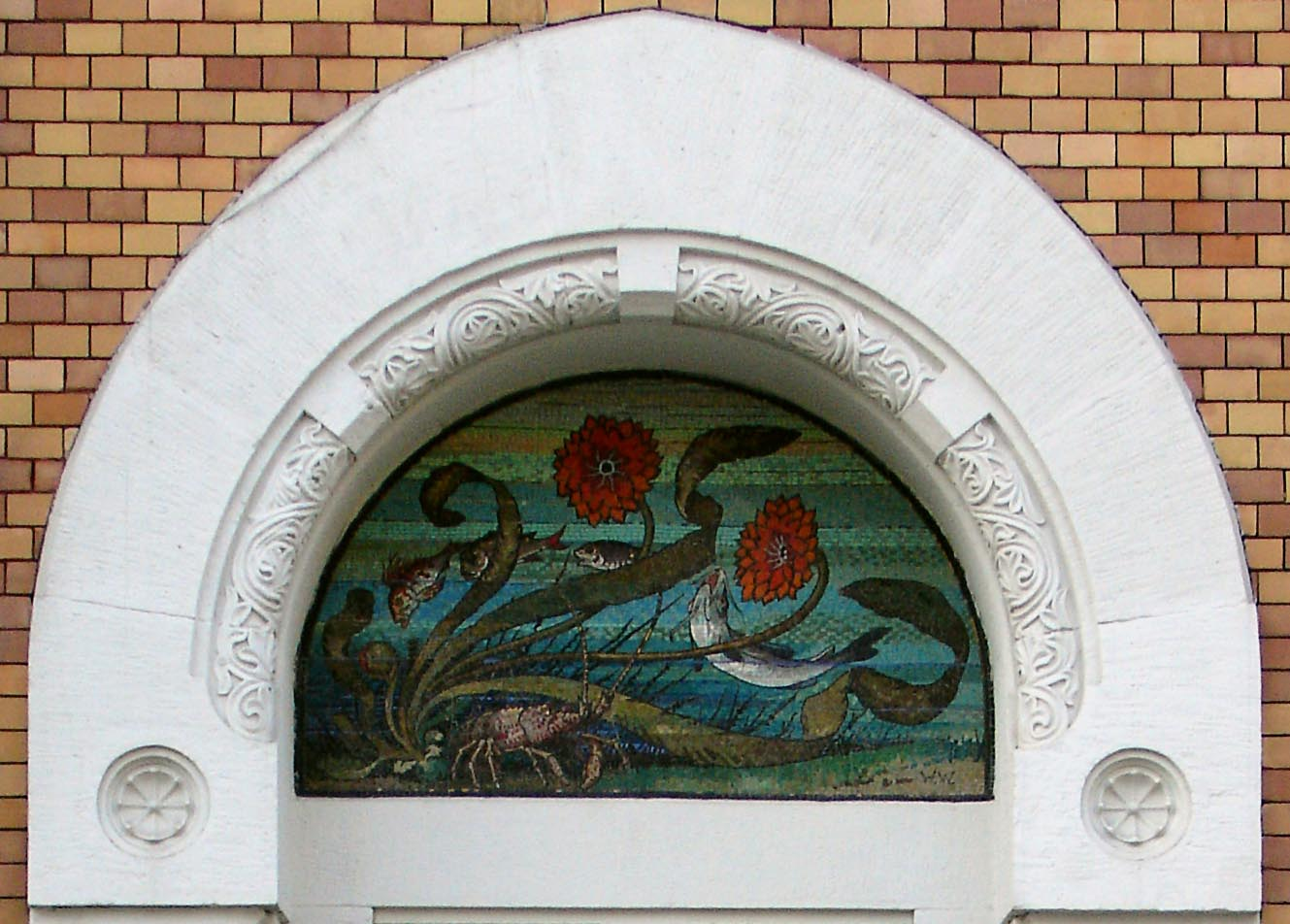
8 Glazovsky Lane, William Walcot mosaic frieze

=== Assistant to Semyon Eybuschits ===
- 1890-1893 - Central Public Baths
- 1890-1893 - Okhotny Ryad redevelopment

=== Assistant to Sergey Tikhomirov ===
- 1890-1893 - Apartment Building of Gregory the Theosof Church, Bolshaya Dmitrovka Street

=== Own practice ===
- 1892–1899 I.N.Geyer Almshouse, 15 Verkhaya Krasnoselskaya, photographs
- 1893 — Gagarin Apartment Building, Varsonofievsky Lane (partly destroyed by facadist "reconstruction" in 2000s)
- 1894–1895 — Korobkov House, Pyatnitskaya Street (with Sergey Shutzman)
- 1894–1896 — Khludov Apartment Building,
- 1898–1900 — Grachev Estate, Khovrino, now 77 Festivalnaya Street, Moscow, modelled after casino in Monte-Carlo by Charles Garnier
- 1898–1899 — Gustav List House, 8 Glazovsky Lane, with William Walcot mosaic frieze. Kekushev started this building for himself, but halfway into construction, List offered him the bounty Kekushev could not resist.
- 1898–1899 — Odintsovo rail station
- 1899 — Nekrasov Building, 4 Gogol Boulevard
- 1899–1900 — Saarbekov House, Povarskaya Street
- 1899–1900 — Iberian Trade Rows, Nikolskaya Street
- 1900–1903 — Own house, 21 Ostozhenka Street (also known as Kekysheva House, as he had to give it to his ex-wife in settling their divorce)
- 1902–1921 — Gogol Boulevard
- 1903 — Nosov House, Electrozavodskaya Street
- 1903 — Mindovsky House, 44 Povarskaya Street (Embassy of New Zealand) interior photographs
- 1903–1904 — Ponizovsky House, 42 Povarskaya Street (Embassy of Afghanistan)
- 1898–1907 — construction manager for Hotel Metropol (Moscow), lead architect: William Walcot
- 1904–1906 — Isakov Apartment Building, 28 Prechistenka Street
- 1906 — Railway stations of Moscow-Yaroslavl railroad
- 1906 — Interiors, Praga Restaurant (Arbat Square) and Morozov House (Prechistenka Street)
- 1910 — expansion of Yaroslavsky Rail Terminal
- 1911 — Rudnev Hospital, Serebryany Lane
- 1912 — Hospital near Preobrazhenskoye Cemetery
