= List of international trips made by Amir Khan Muttaqi as Minister of Foreign Affairs of Afghanistan =

This is a list of international visits made by Amir Khan Muttaqi while serving as Foreign Minister of Afghanistan, a position he has held since the Taliban's takeover of Afghanistan in 2021, on an acting basis until 2025.

Muttaqi is on a list of Taliban officials sanctioned under United Nations Security Council Resolution 1988, which includes a travel ban. He was initially among 13 members given a waiver allowing for travel. Though it had previously been extended multiple times, the Security Council did not renew the waiver on 19 August 2022, calling into question Muttaqi's continued ability to make trips abroad. However, Muttaqi has continued making limited trips abroad through one-time exemptions granted after requests from the host countries.

== Summary ==
Muttaqi has visited 12 countries during his tenure. The number of visits per country where Muttaqi traveled are:

- One visit to India, Norway, Oman, Saudi Arabia, Turkmenistan and Uzbekistan
- Two visits to China
- Three visits to Iran, Pakistan, Russia, and Turkey
- Six visits to Qatar

== Table ==
	Country	Locations	Details	Dates	Images
1	Qatar	Doha	First meeting between Taliban and U.S. officials since the Taliban takeover. Muttaqi led a delegation that met with a U.S. delegation led by Deputy CIA Director David Cohen and US Special Envoy for Afghanistan Tom West. Discussed political issues and humanitarian aid. Muttaqi also spoke at the Doha Institute's Center for Conflict and Humanitarian Studies and met with Chinese Foreign Minister Wang Yi.	9–26 October 2021	
2	Pakistan	Islamabad	Met with Pakistani Foreign Minister Shah Mahmood Qureshi to discuss trade and relations	10 November 2021	
3	Qatar	Doha	Met with Deputy Prime Minister of Qatar and Foreign Minister Mohammed bin Abdulrahman Al-Thani and discussed relations, human rights, terrorism, and humanitarian aid	27 November 2021	
4	Pakistan	Islamabad	Spoke at a special meeting of the Organisation of Islamic Cooperation called to address the Afghanistan crisis	19 December 2021	
5	Iran	Tehran	Met with rebel leaders for peace talks. Also met with Iranian Foreign Minister Hossein Amir-Abdollahian.	9–10 January 2022	
6	Turkmenistan	Ashgabat	Met with Vice President of Turkmenistan and Minister of Foreign Affairs Raşit Meredow to discuss relations and oil, gas, and railway infrastructure projects	14–15 January 2022	
7	Norway	Oslo	Led a delegation meeting with Afghan civil society leaders, including women, and diplomats from the United States, the European Union, the United Kingdom, France, Italy, Norway, and the United Nations. Humanitarian aid, women's rights, and bringing greater inclusivity to the Taliban's caretaker government were discussed.	22–25 January 2022	
8	Qatar	Doha	Met with leaders of the Gulf Cooperation Council to discuss aid to Afghanistan	14–18 February 2022	
9	Turkey	Antalya	Spoke at the Antalya Diplomacy Forum and had a trilateral meeting with Qatari Foreign Minister Mohammed bin Abdulrahman Al Thani and US Special Envoy for Afghanistan Thomas West. Also met with Turkish Foreign Minister Mevlüt Çavuşoğlu.	9–13 March 2022	
10	China	Tunxi	Met with the foreign ministers of Russia, Iran, Pakistan, China, Tajikistan, Turkmenistan, and Uzbekistan. Discussed refugees, economic activity, human rights in Afghanistan, and the Taliban's commitments against terrorism.	31 March 2022	
11	Qatar	Doha	Met with US Special Envoy for Afghanistan Tom West to discuss relations and the political situation in Afghanistan. Also met with UK Chargé d'Affaires Hugo Shorter and discussed humanitarian aid, girls education, and increased inclusivity of the Taliban government.	29 June – 1 July 2022	
12	Uzbekistan	Tashkent	Attended a meeting of the Shanghai Cooperation Organisation Foreign Ministers Council. Met with Chinese Foreign Minister Wang Yi on the sidelines.	24–28 July 2022	
13	Pakistan	Islamabad	Met with Pakistani Foreign Minister Bilawal Bhutto Zardari. Planned to attend the fifth China-Pakistan-Afghanistan Trilateral Foreign Ministers' Dialogue.	5–9 May 2023	
14	Qatar	Doha	Met with a United States delegation led by U.S. Mission Chief Karen B. Decker and U.S. Special Envoy for Afghan Women, Girls, and Human Rights Rina Amiri. First formal U.S.–Taliban diplomatic engagement since the 2021 takeover.	30–31 July 2023	
15	Russia	Moscow and Kazan	Participated in the Moscow Format and regional talks in Kazan.	25–29 September 2023	
16	China	Nyingchi	Attended the 3rd Trans-Himalaya Forum for International Cooperation. Met with Pakistani Foreign Minister Jalil Abbas Jilani on the sidelines.	3–5 October 2023	
17	Turkey	Ankara	Met with Turkish Foreign Minister Hakan Fidan.	29 October 2023	
18	Iran	Tehran	Attended a political conference on the Israeli–Palestinian conflict and met with Iranian officials including Foreign Minister Hossein Amir-Abdollahian.	22–27 December 2023	
19	Iran	Tehran	Met Emir of Qatar Tamim bin Hamad Al Thani alongside Abdul Ghani Baradar	22 May 2024	
20	Russia	Moscow	Attended the Moscow Format	4 October 2024	
21	Oman	Muscat	Met senior Omani officials, including Foreign Minister Badr bin Hamad Al Busaidi, to discuss political and economic relations.	9–14 March 2025	
22	Saudi Arabia	Mecca	Performed Umrah and received a formal welcome by Saudi officials.	23 March – 10 April 2025	
23	Qatar	Doha	Meeting with Qatari government officials to discuss bilateral relations.	27 April – 4 May 2025	
24	Turkey	Istanbul	Attended the Organization of Islamic Cooperation's foreign ministers meeting.	21–22 June 2025	
25	Russia	Moscow	Participated in the Moscow Format, for the first time as an officially recognized representative of Afghanistan.	7 October 2025	
26	India	New Delhi, Deoband	Formal meeting with External Affairs Minister S. Jaishankar. He also visited Darul Uloom Deoband, the birthplace of the Deobandi movement.	9–13 October 2025	
