= Mindovsky House =

Building in Moscow, Russia

Coordinates: 55°45′25″N 37°35′20″E

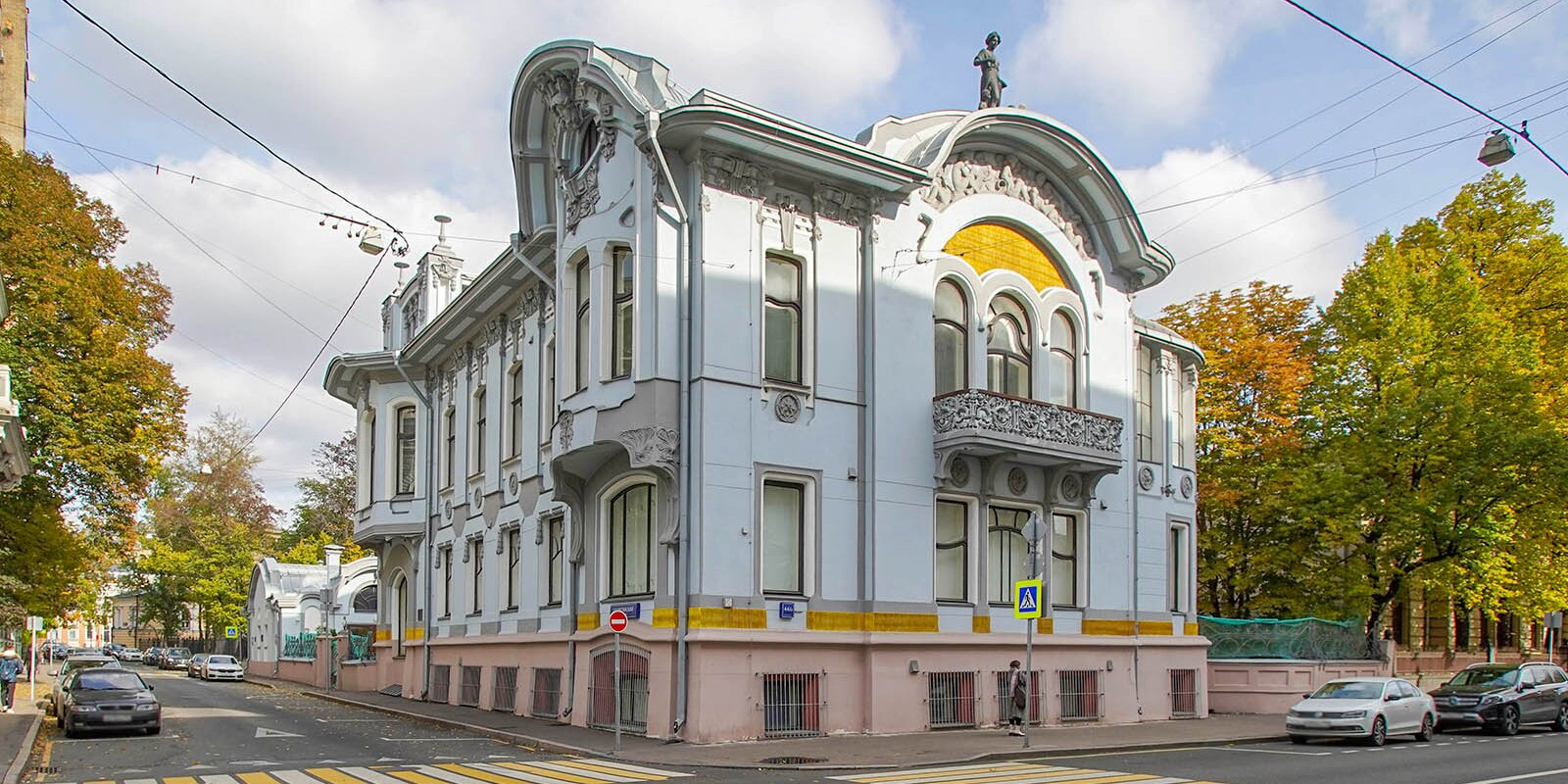
Mindovsky House, the Embassy of New Zealand in Moscow

Mindovsky House is an example of Art Nouveau architecture, designed by Lev Kekushev and built by the Moscow Trading-and-Construction Joint Stock Company in 1903. It is located at 44 Povarskaya Street (Russian: Поварская ул., 44) in the Arbat district of Moscow.

The diplomatic mission of New Zealand in the Russian Federation has been housed in the building since 1973 (except for the period 2015-2023 when the building was under renovation and the embassy located at Prechistenskaya Naberezhnaya 3).

== See also ==
- New Zealand–Russia relations
- Diplomatic missions in Russia
