= Bolshaya Nikitskaya Street =

Thoroughfare in Moscow, Russia

Coordinates: 55°45′27″N 37°35′54″E

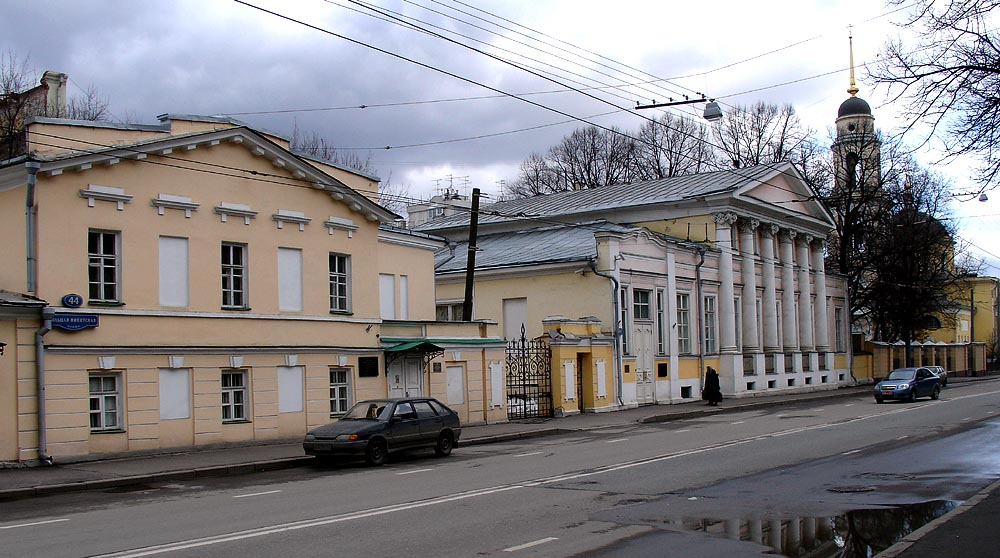
Western segment of Bolshaya Nikitskaya, looking east from Embassy of Spain, with Great Ascension church in the distance

Bolshaya Nikitskaya Street (Russian: Большая Никитская улица, Bolshaya Nikitskaya ulitsa) is a radial street that runs west from Mokhovaya Street to Garden Ring in Moscow, between Vozdvizhenka Street (south) and Tverskaya Street (north). Central, eastern part of the street is notable for its educational institutions (old Moscow State University and Moscow Conservatory) and theaters, western part beyond the Boulevard Ring has many Neoclassical mansions and competes with nearby Povarskaya Street for the title of Moscow's Embassy Row.

== History ==
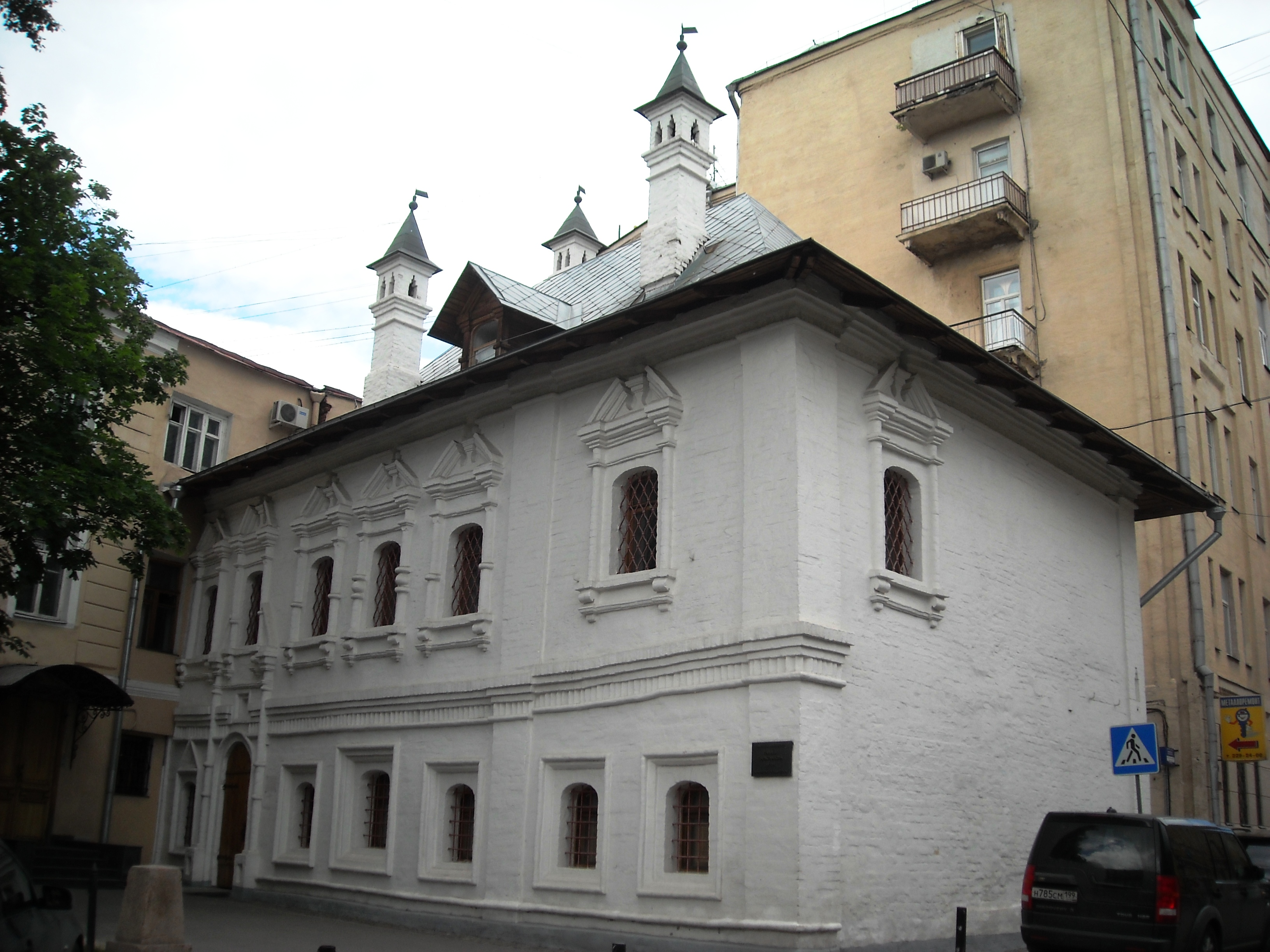
17th century palace in Bryusov Lane

The street originated in the Middle Ages as a thoroughfare leading to Volokolamsk and Novgorod and was known as Volotskaya Street (eastern half) and Novgorodskaya Street (western half); a colony of Novgorod traders existed in present-day Bryusov Lane till the 18th century.

In the 16th century, Ivan IV of Russia established his Oprichnina Court on site of present-day University buildings. Nikitskaya name goes back to Nikitsky Convent that stood on site of present-day Subway Substation (no.7/10). The street housed various working communities serving the court, however, as soon as the 17th century, it also gained popularity among nobility. In Peter I's reign, it housed Peter's statesmen like Jacob Bruce, Fyodor Romodanovsky and admiral Fyodor Apraksin. The tradition continued with later statesmen like Alexander Suvorov, and by the end of the 18th century the street became an exclusive upper-class area, with one exception: the central corner block, occupied by Moscow State University building by Matvey Kazakov (1780s).

The Fire of Moscow (1812) destroyed only part of the street: the University burnt down (rebuilt in the 1810s by Domenico Gilardi and Afanasy Grigoriev); the French Theater, protected by Napoleon, survived. In the 1830s, the University expanded across the street south and acquired Saint Tatiana church by Yevgraph Tyurin.

The street's most notable landmark is the Greater Church of the Ascension. It was started in the 1790s by Matvey Kazakov with funds provided by Prince Potemkin; after 1812, the church was redesigned by Joseph Bové and completed by Afanasy Grigoriev in the 1840s. It has been the site of Alexander Pushkin's wedding.

In the late 19th century, the central segment of Bolshaya Nikitskaya was built out with a tight pattern of 3-5 storey buildings, including Moscow Conservatory (first stage 1895-1901). Western part of the street remains a quiet area of old mansions. In 1917, Nikitsky Gates Square on Boulevard Ring was the site of urban war between Bolsheviks and government troops. The corner block on Tverskoy Boulevard, facing the square, burnt down. New city administration preferred to keep the open area and installed the monument to Kliment Timiryazev (1923), one of the oldest extant monuments of Soviet age.

== Gallery ==
Architectural diversity - from Neoclassicism to Art Nouveau

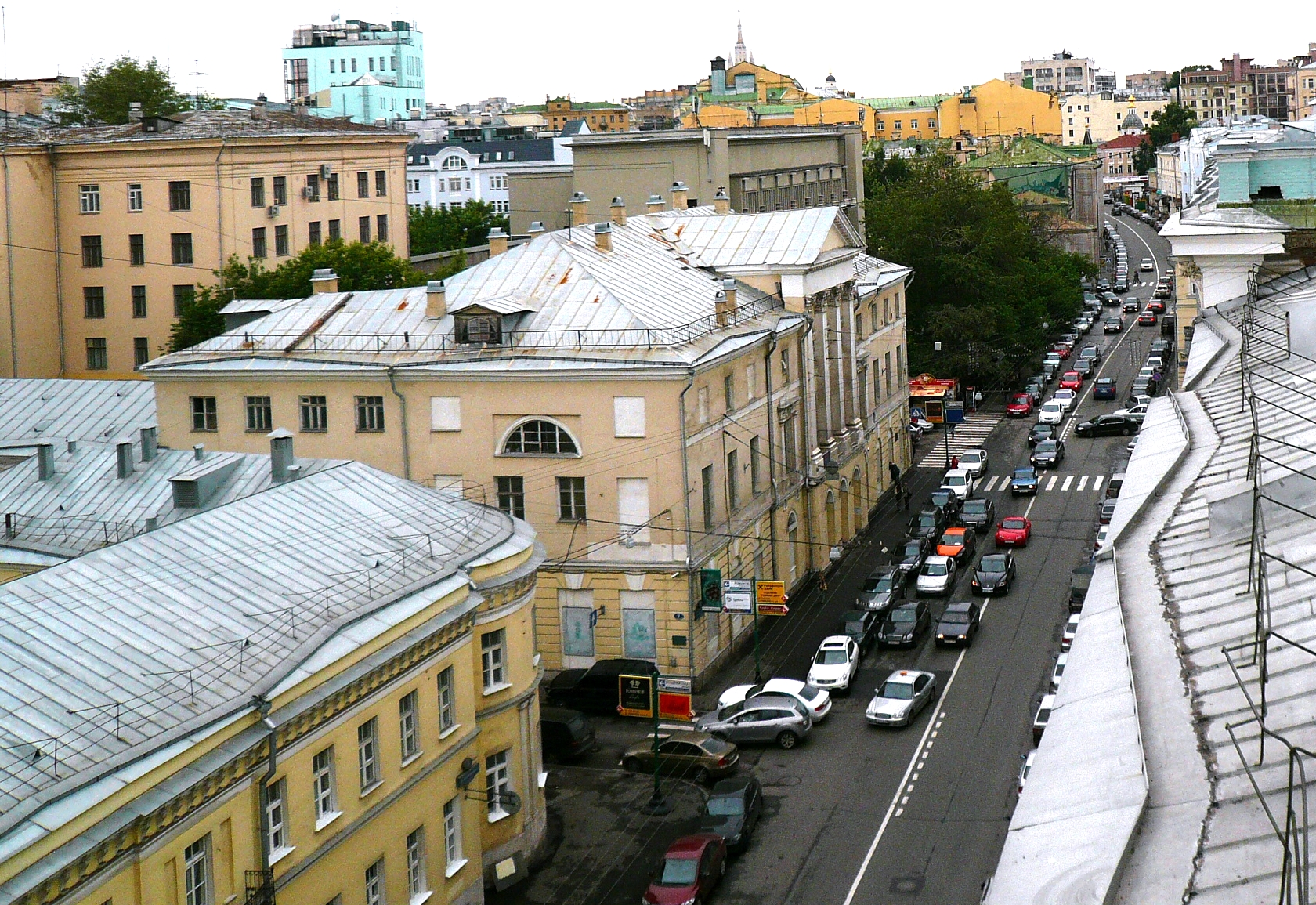
View from the roof of No.2

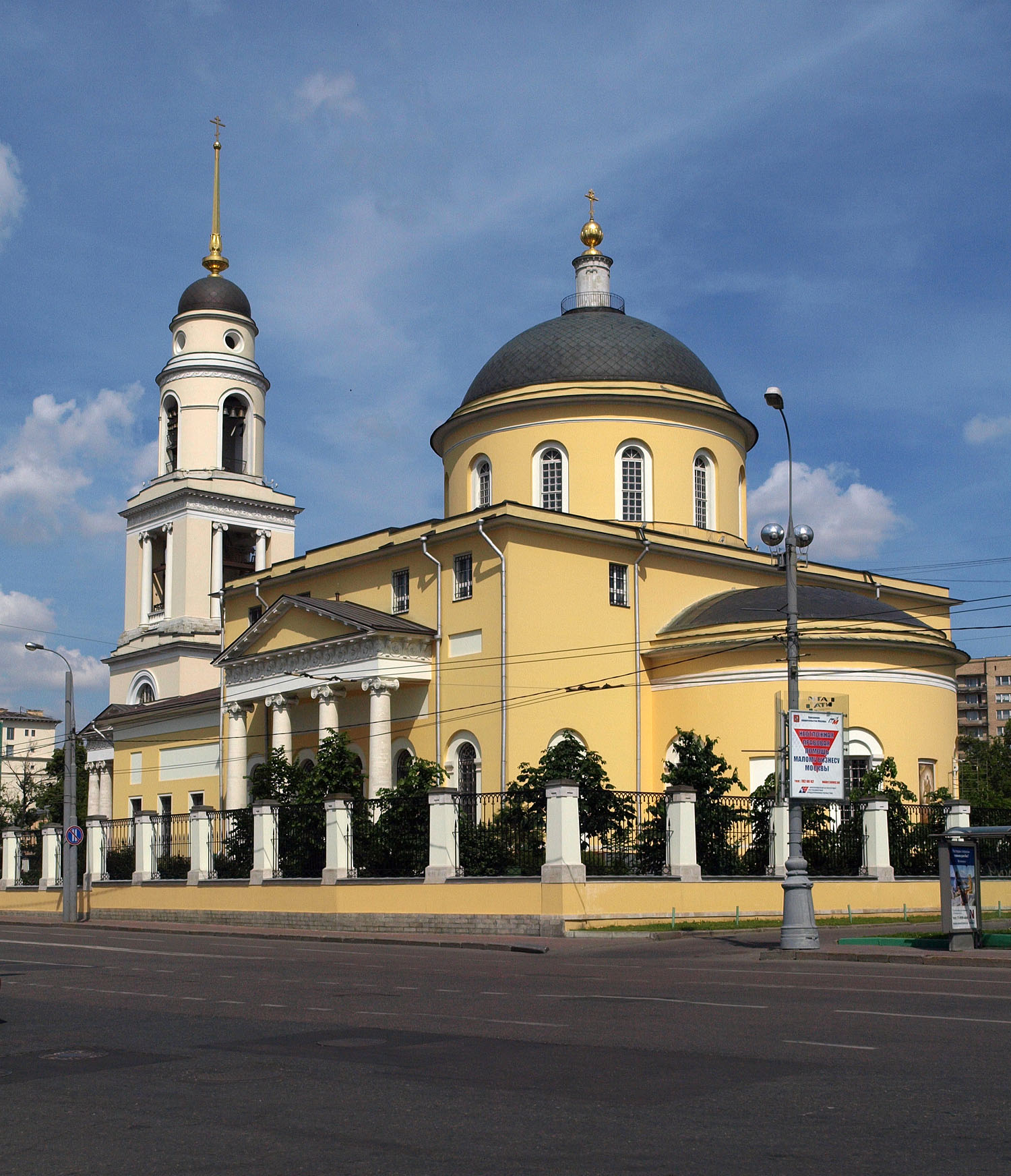
Neoclassism: No.36, Greater Ascension Church

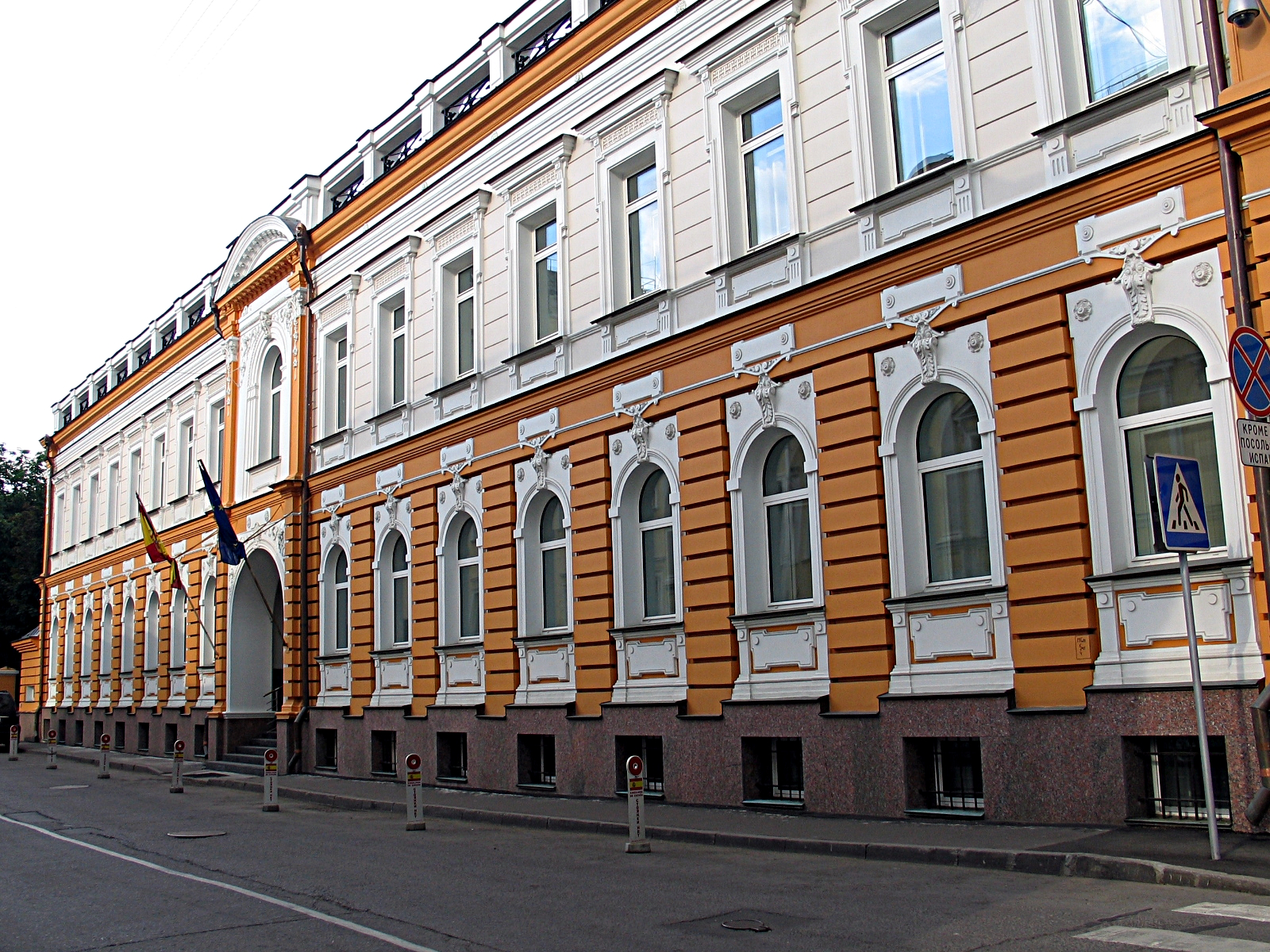
Eclectics: No.50, Embassy of Spain

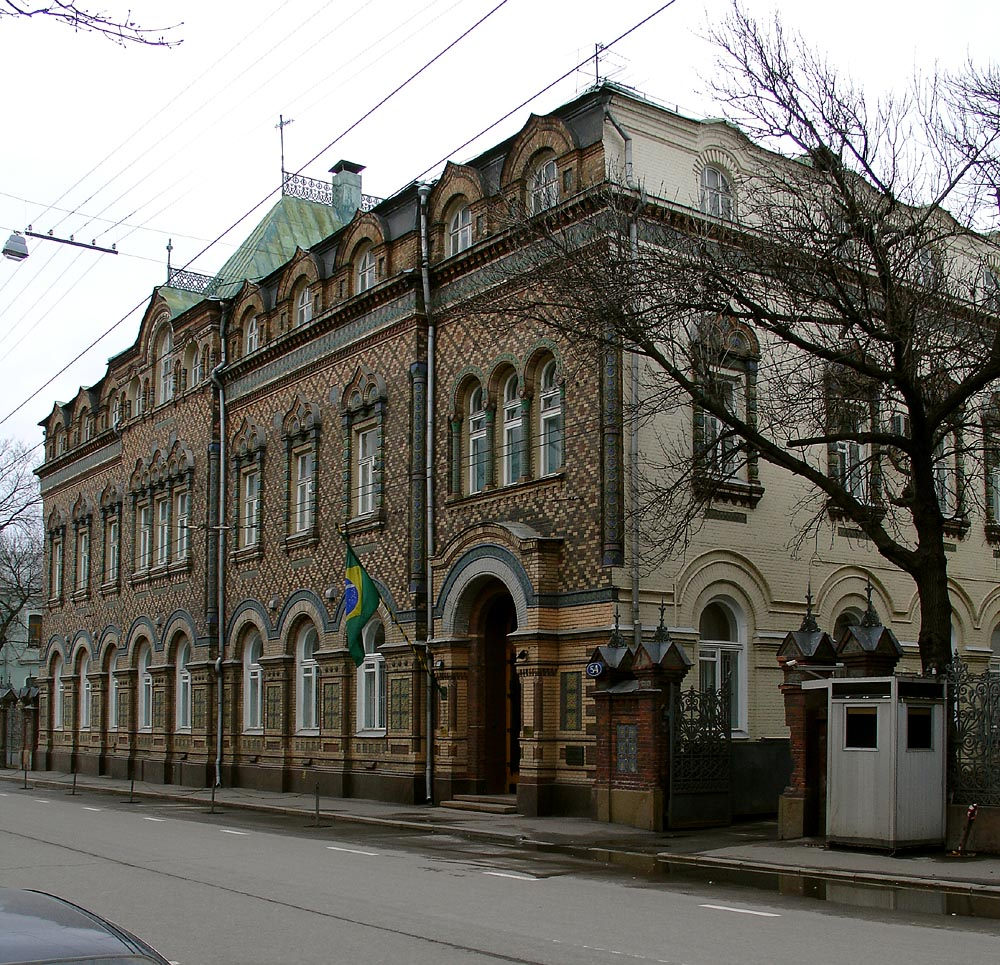
Russian Revival: No.54, Embassy of Brazil

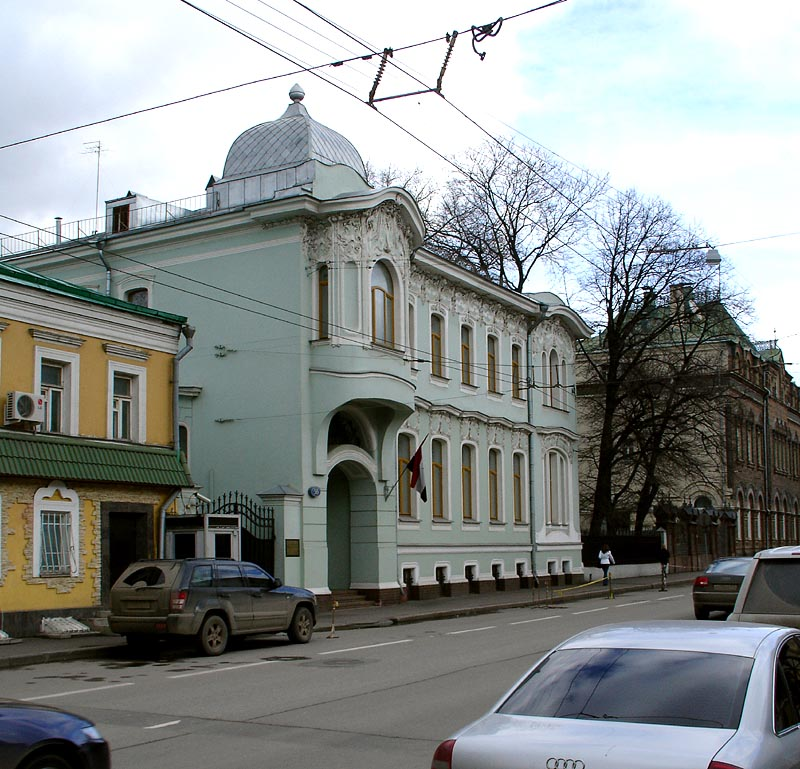
Style Moderne: No.56, Jacob Reck house

== Notable buildings and institutions ==
=== Within Boulevard Ring ===
- 1,2,3,4,6 - Moscow State University
- 5,7 - Orlov House by Matvey Kazakov
- 6 - Zoological Museum of Moscow State University (official site)
- 12 - Menshikov House by Matvey Kazakov
- 13 - Moscow Conservatory
- 14 - Jacob Bruce estate
- 18 - Lesser Ascension Church, 1584
- 19 - Mayakovsky Theater, Helikon Opera, Glebov Estate
- 28 - TASS Building

=== Beyond Boulevard Ring ===
- 36 - Greater Ascension Church by Joseph Bove and Afanasy Grigoriev
- 42 - Alexander Suvorov estate, with Embassy of Nigeria facing Malaya Nikitskaya Street
- 41 - Embassy of Myanmar
- 44, 46 - Neoclassical estates, 1820s
- 50 - Embassy of Spain
- 51 - Consulate of Cyprus
- 54 - Lopatina Building by Alexander Kaminsky (Embassy of Brazil)
- 55 - Svyatopolk estate by Pyotr Boytsov
- 56 - Art Nouveau Jacob Reck House by Gustav Helrich

== Public transportation access ==
- Okhotny Ryad, Teatralnaya - east
- Pushkinskaya or Arbatskaya - center (Nikitsky Gates Square)
- Barrikadnaya, Mayakovskaya - west
