= Mokhovaya Street =

Street in Moscow, Russia

Coordinates: 55°45′10″N 37°36′40″E

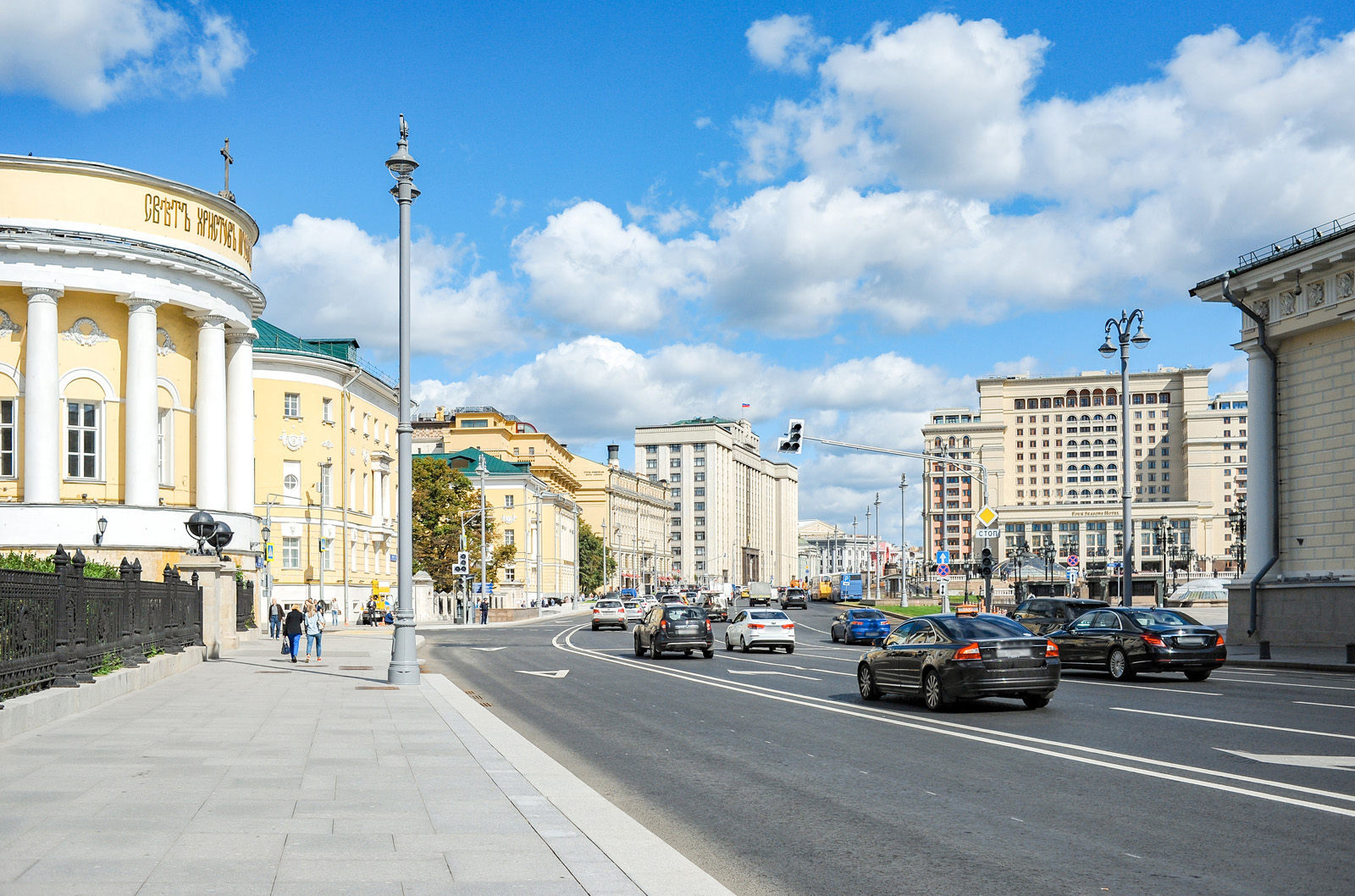
- Interactive map of Mokhovaya Street
- Native name: Моховая улица (Russian)
- Location: Moscow; Central Administrative Okrug; Arbat District; Tverskoy District
- Nearest metro station: Biblioteka Imeni Lenina; Borovitskaya; Okhotny Ryad

Mokhovaya Street (Russian: Моховая улица) is a one-way street in central Moscow, Russia, a part of Moscow's innermost ring road - Central Squares of Moscow. Between 1961 and 1990 it formed part of Karl Marx Avenue (Проспект Маркса). The street runs from the Borovitskaya Square (named after nearby Borovitskaya Tower) in the south past Vozdvizhenka Street, Bolshaya Nikitskaya Street and Manege Square, ending at Tverskaya Street in the north.

Traffic on Mokhovaya follows a northwards counterclockwise pattern as the parallel Manezhnaya Street is closed to regular traffic.

== History ==
The name of a street, literally Moss Street, emerged in the 18th century after the Moss Market that stood on site of Moscow Manege and traded in moss for caulking log houses. The street is much older, dating back to the court of Sophia of Lithuania, wife of Vasili I of Russia (1490s). At that time the area was known as Vagankovo (different from present-day Vagankovo Cemetery). Ivan IV of Russia has set his Oprichnina court here, south from Bolshaya Nikitskaya Street; the block occupied by Russian State Library belonged to Shuisky family.

In the 1780s and 1790s the street acquired monumental early neoclassical buildings by Vasily Bazhenov and Matvey Kazakov. In 1812, Kazakov's Moscow State University burnt down and was rebuilt with a different, late neoclassical, facade; Yevgraph Tyurin built a second University building on Mokhovaya, with a church of Saint Tatiana, the patron saint of University. Across the street, Agustín de Betancourt and Joseph Bove erected the block-wide Moscow Manege (1817-1825, rebuilt after a fire in 2005).

In the early 1930s, communist administration has cleared blocks between the street, Manege and Moscow Kremlin all the way to Theatre Square. After completion of Hotel Moskva, the large tract of land between it and the Manege was paved into what was then known as Manege Square; in the 1990s, the square was excavated for a Manege Square pit shopping mall.

In 1933-1935, Mokhovaya was the site of a massive subway construction. Here, the westbound trains from Sokolniki interleaved between proceeding straight to Park Kultury, or taking a sharp right turn to Smolenskaya via Alexandrovsky Sad. This arrangement is now impossible, as the construction of Manege Square pit in 1990s destroyed the tunnels between Sokolnicheskaya Line and Alexandrovsky Sad. Construction of the shopping centre blocked all of Manege Square for street traffic, eventually converting Manege Street and Revolution Square into large parking lots without through traffic.

== Gallery ==
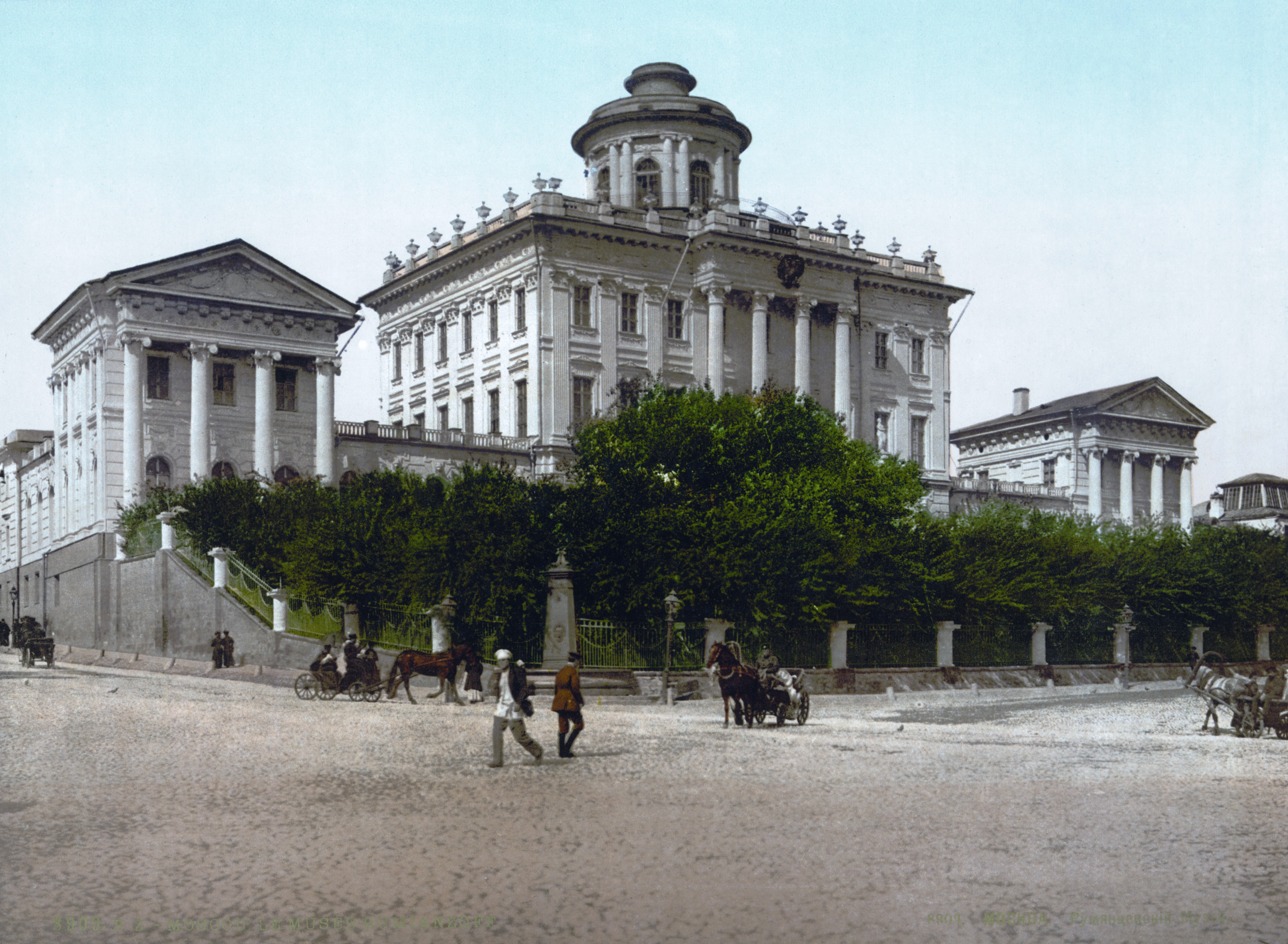
3, Mokhovaya, Pashkov House

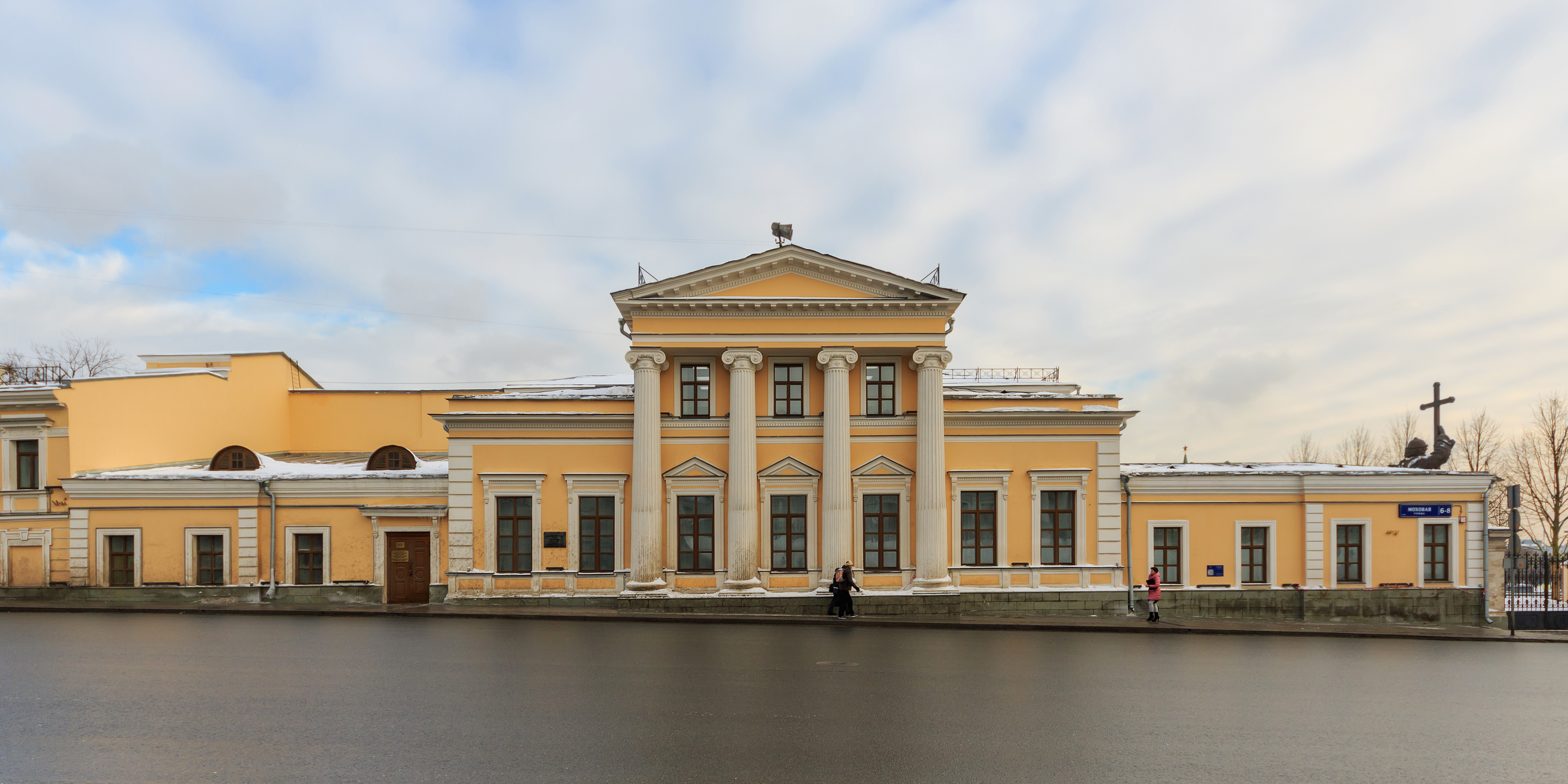
8, Mokhovaya, former Kalinin Museum

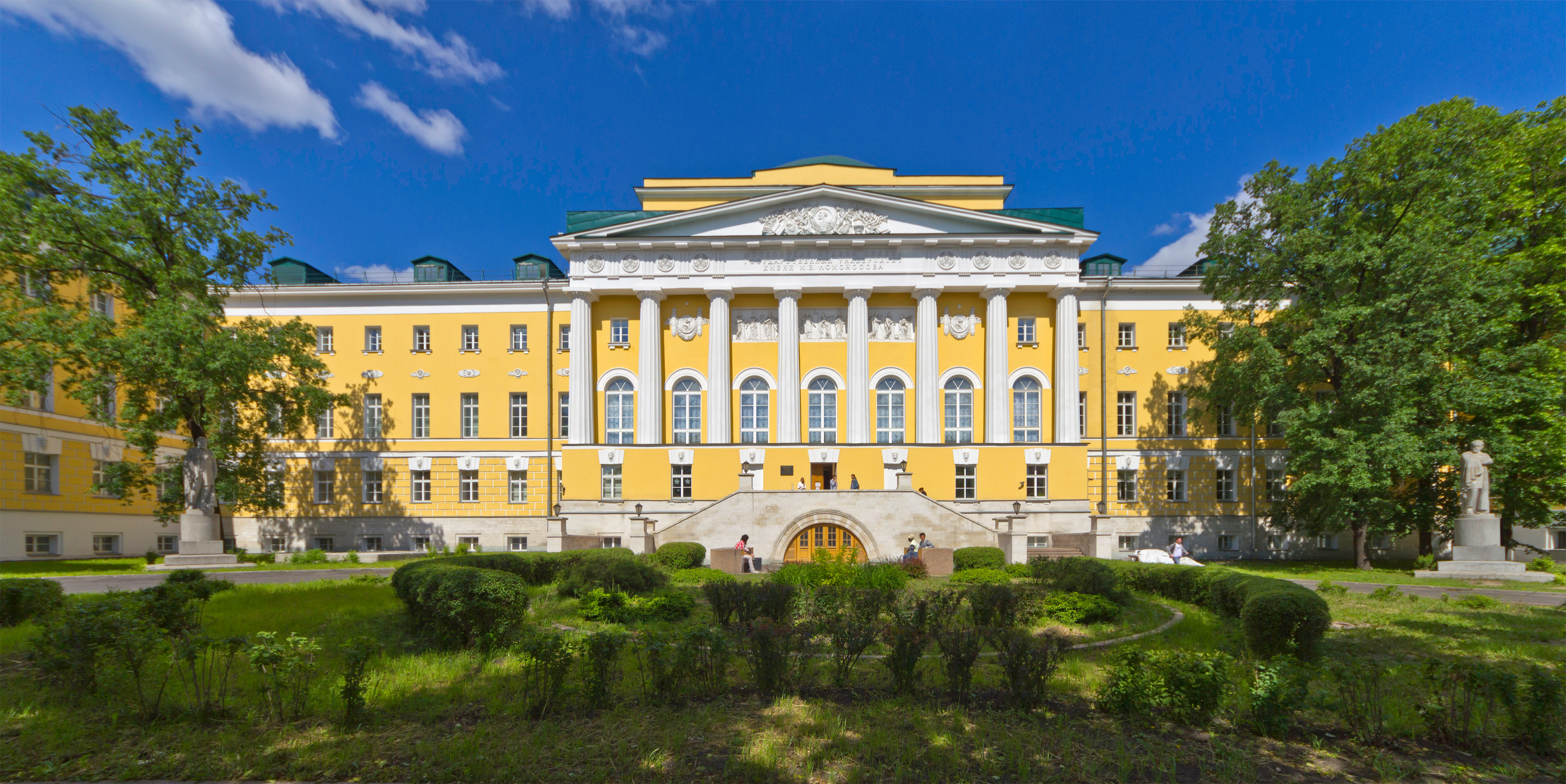
11, the old University building

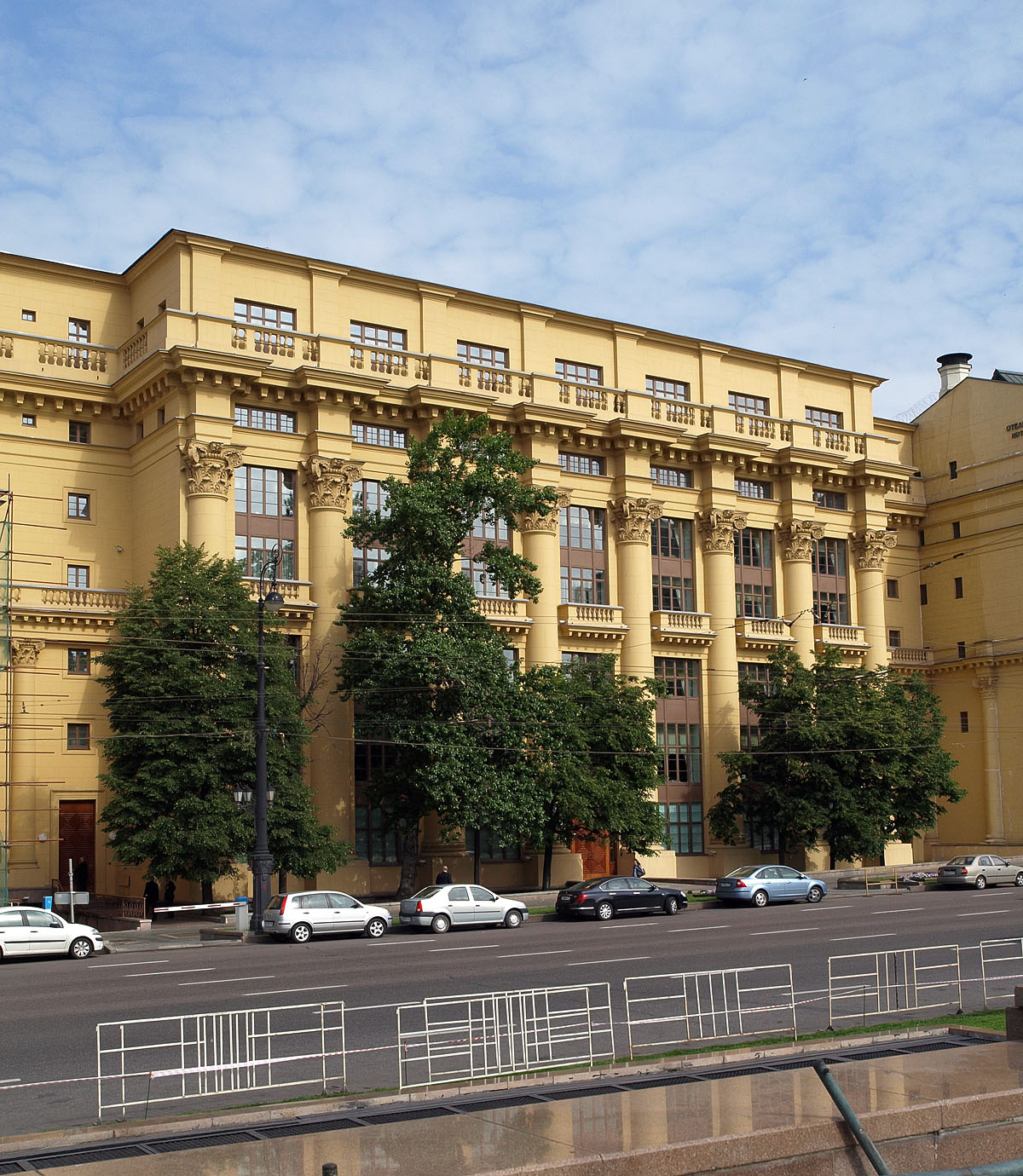
13, Mokhovaya Building

== Notable buildings and institutions ==
- 3 - Pashkov House (1780s, attributed to Vasily Bazhenov), former Rumyantsev Museum, now the Old Building of the Russian State Library
- 5 - Russian State Library, "new" building by Vladimir Schuko (1928-1958)
- 8 - Neoclassical "old Moscow" house, former Mikhail Kalinin museum, Shakhovskoy House
- 9 - Moscow State University with Saint Tatiana Church by Yevgraph Tyurin (1830s)
- Moscow Manege, across the University, has an official address at 1, Manege Street
- 11 - Moscow State University, originally built by Matvey Kazakov between 1784 and the 1790s, restored after the Fire of Moscow (1812) by Domenico Giliardi and Afanasy Grigoriev
- 13 - Neo-Renaissance Mokhovaya Building by Ivan Zholtovsky (1930s). This early stalinist architecture landmark was recently "restored" by facadist methodes, leaving only the exterior wall intact. Originally intended as an apartment building, it housed the United States Embassy in the 1940s, and later Intourist.
- 15 - Hotel National (1880s)
