= 1816 in architecture =

The year 1816 in architecture involved some significant architectural events and new buildings.

== Events ==
- February – Carl Ludvig Engel is appointed architect for the reconstruction of Helsinki.
- In Paris, the Académie royale d'architecture merges with the Académie de peinture et de sculpture (the French Academy) to become the École Nationale Supérieure des Beaux-Arts, the French National School of Fine Arts.

== Buildings and structures ==
=== Buildings ===
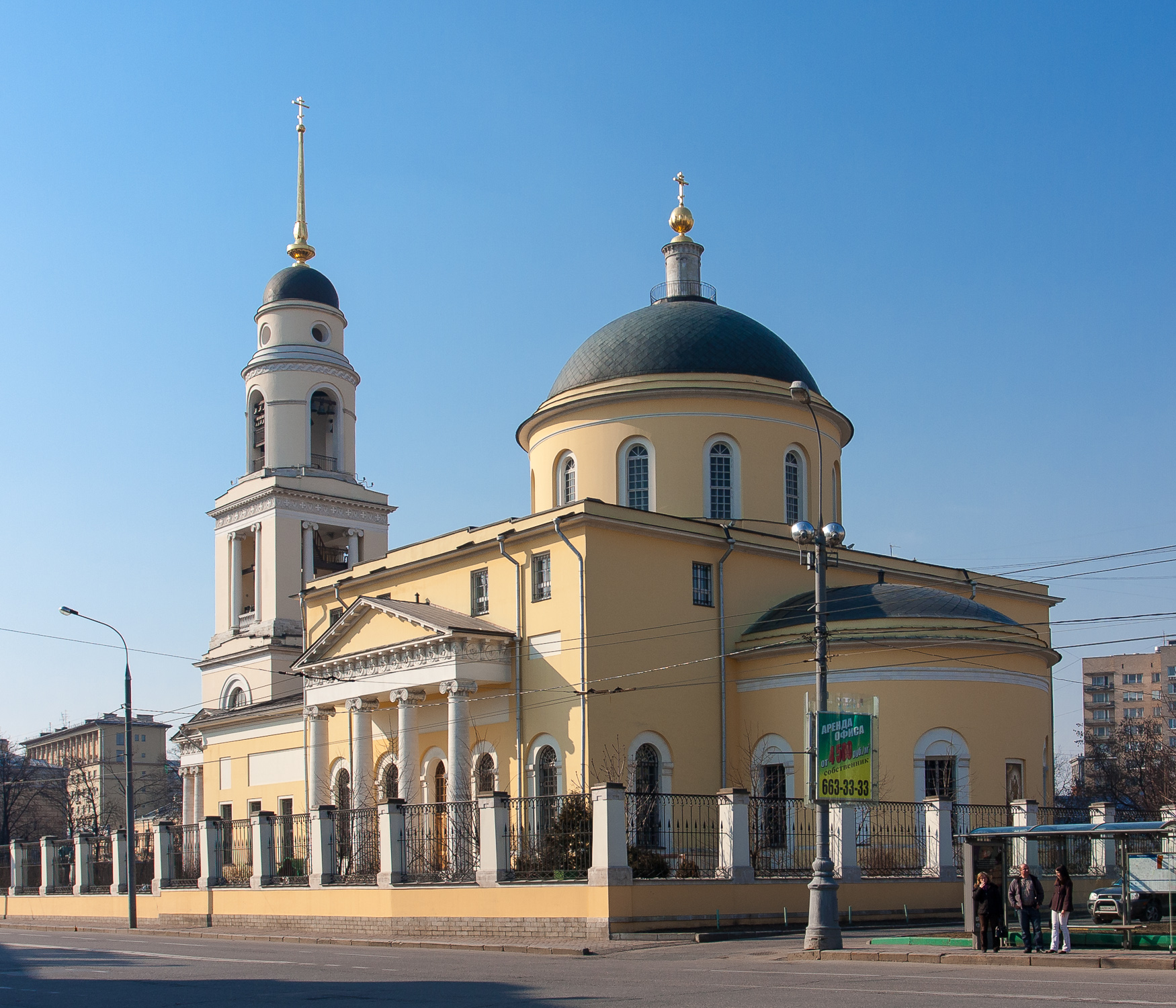
The Greater Church of the Ascension in Moscow, Russia

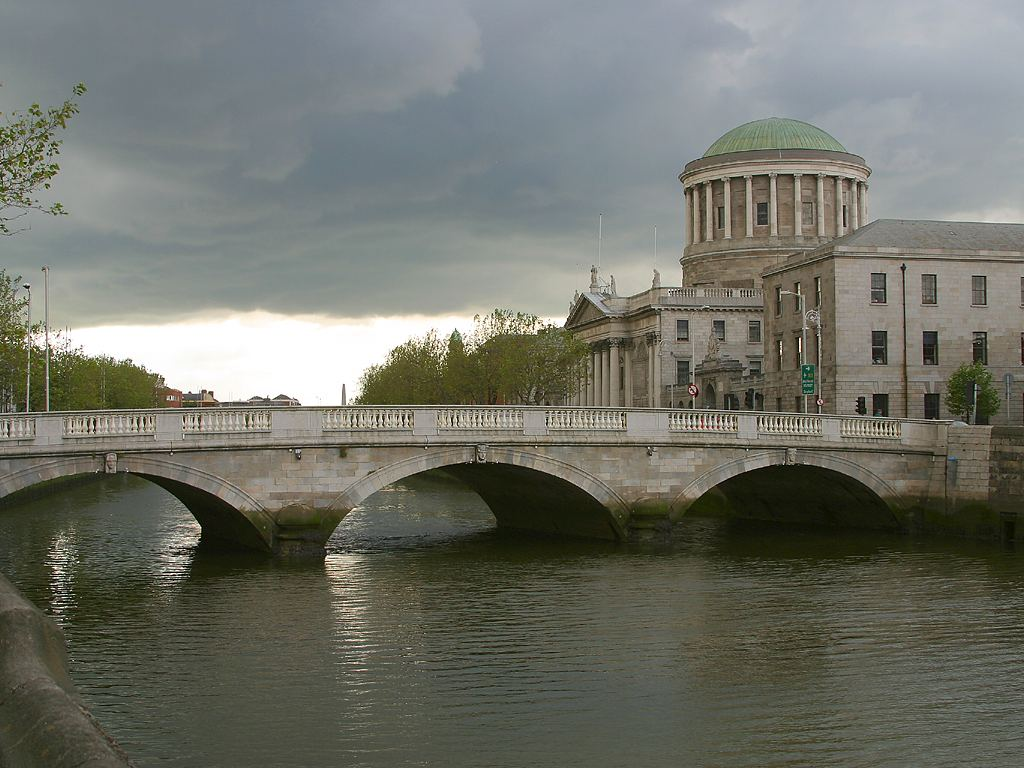
Richmond Bridge, Dublin

- First Church of Christ, Lancaster, Massachusetts, designed by Charles Bulfinch, is built.
- First Unitarian Church of Providence in Providence, Rhode Island, designed by John Holden Greene, is completed.
- Karlsruhe Stadtkirche (Baden), designed by Friedrich Weinbrenner, is completed.
- Greater Church of the Ascension in Moscow, attributed to Matvey Kazakov or Ivan Starov, is completed.
- Stone Church of the Intercession of the Most Holy Mother of God in Khanty-Mansiysk, Russia, designed by Shangin, is completed about this date.
- Circular church of San Francesco di Paola (Naples) is completed.
- St Andrew's Church, Glasgow, Scotland (Roman Catholic), designed by James Gillespie Graham, is completed.
- Walcot Wesleyan Methodist Chapel, Bath, England, designed by Rev. William Jenkins, is completed.
- Wellington Rooms, Liverpool, England, designed by Edmund Aikin, are completed.
- Fredericksburg Town Hall and Market Square in Virginia are completed.
- Lancaster County Lunatic Asylum in England, designed by Thomas Standen, is opened.
- South Wing of Sydney Hospital in Australia is completed.
- Berkshire County Courthouse, Lenox, Massachusetts, is completed.
- Théâtre des Funambules in Paris is built.
- Lord Hill's Column in Shrewsbury, England, designed by Edward Haycock, Sr. and Thomas Harrison, is completed.
- Tenantry Column in Alnwick, England, designed by David Stephenson, is erected.
- Vauxhall Bridge, originally known as Regent Bridge, crossing the River Thames in central London, designed by James Walker, is opened; it is replaced in 1895–1906.
- Richmond Bridge, crossing the River Liffey in Dublin, Ireland, designed by James Savage, is opened.
- The Ha'penny Bridge (Wellington Bridge), crossing the River Liffey in Dublin, Ireland, is erected.
- Spider Bridge at Falls of Schuylkill in Pennsylvania is erected by ironmakers Josiah White and Erskine Hazard, the first wire-cable suspension bridge in history.
- Design of Bahu Begum ka Maqbara in Faizabad, Uttar Pradesh by Darab Ali Khan.

== Awards ==
- Grand Prix de Rome, architecture: Lucien Van Cleemputte.

== Births ==
- July 11 – Frans-Andries Durlet, Belgian architect and sculptor (died 1867)
- August 9 – Patrick Keely, Irish-American architect based in Brooklyn (died 1896)
- August 29 – Gridley James Fox Bryant, Boston architect and builder (died 1899)

== Deaths ==
- April 3 – Thomas Machin, English-born canal builder and military engineer in the United States (born 1744)
