= Greater Church of the Ascension =

Church building in Moscow, Russia

Coordinates: 55°45′27″N 37°35′44″E

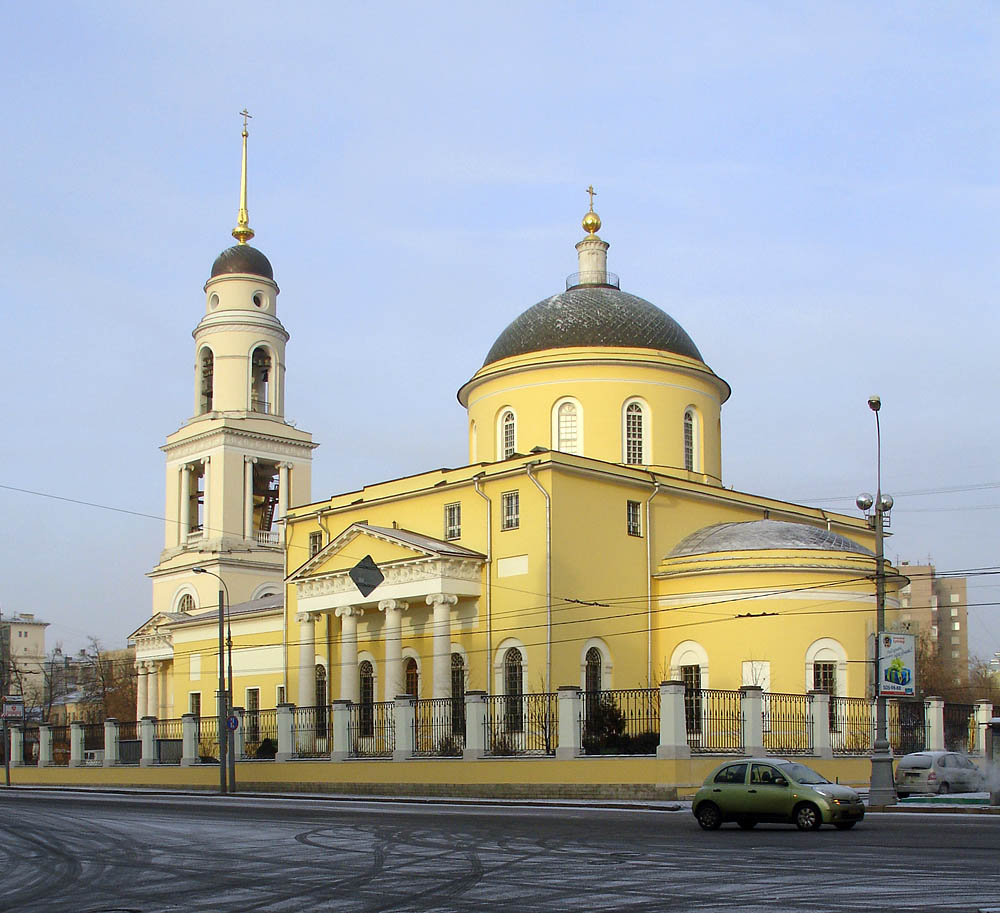
Greater Church of the Ascension

The Greater Church of Christ's Ascension (Большое Вознесение) is one of the largest parish churches in downtown Moscow. It is a major landmark of Bolshaya Nikitskaya Street and Nikitskiye Vorota Square. It is named "greater" to prevent confusion with a nearby church of the same name.

The church was commissioned by Prince Potemkin, the owner of a neighbouring messuage, shortly before his death. The yellow-colored Neoclassical building was erected between 1798 and 1816. The name of the architect is not known for certain. It has been attributed either to Matvey Kazakov, who built numerous Moscow churches in the reign of Catherine the Great, or Ivan Starov, who frequently worked for Potemkin. The edifice was overhauled to Osip Bove's designs after the 1812 Fire of Moscow. It stood unfinished for several decades and was not completed (under Afanasy Grigoriev's supervision) until 1848.

The church holds historical significance for several reasons. It was in this church that Alexander Pushkin married Natalia Goncharova, a fact commemorated by their fountain statues on Nikitskie Vorota Square. It was also there that Patriarch Tikhon of Moscow held his last service; this is commemorated by a side-chapel dedicated in his name.

The church was closed during the Soviet period, between 1931 and 1990. A 17th-century tent-like belfry, the sole remnant of an earlier church on the site, was demolished in 1937 and replaced by a statue of Aleksey Tolstoy, the "Red Count". The current belfry, freely based on Kazakov's designs and similar in style to the main church building, is of recent construction. There is a chapel of ease on Arbat Square.

== See also ==
- Great Epiphany Church - a church where Pushkin was baptised
