= Lopukhov =

Lopukhov (Russian: Лопухов, from лопух meaning burdock) is a Russian masculine surname, its feminine counterpart is Lopukhova. Notable people with the surname include:

- Fyodor Lopukhov (1886–1973), Russian ballet choreographer
- Lydia Lopokova (née Lopukhova, 1892–1981), Russian ballerina, sister of Fyodor
- Stanislav Lopukhov (born 1972), Russian swimmer

== See also ==
- Lopukhin
