= Yevgraph Tyurin =

Russian architect

Yevgraph Dmitrievich Tyurin
- Born: 1793 (disputed); Moscow
- Died: 1875 (disputed); Tula
- Occupation: Architect
- Buildings: Elokhovo Cathedral (1837–1845); Moscow State University expansion (1833–1836)

Yefgraph Dmitrievich Tyurin (Russian: Евграф Дмитриевич Тюрин) was a Russian architect and art collector, famous as the builder of Elokhovo Cathedral in Moscow, the main cathedral of Russian Orthodox Church in 1945–2000, and Moscow State University expansion in 1830. Tyurin’s life and work, especially in his later years, was poorly documented. His life period is usually presented as 1792–1870, however, recent studies by Sophia Tyurina-Mitrokhina extend it, most likely, to 1793–1875.

This article is based on biography by Sophia Tyurina-Mitrokhina (2005 edition)

== Biography ==
=== Early years ===
Tyurin was a free born from low classes. The year of his birth is disputed (1792, 1793, 1796). In 1805–1813, Tyurin studied practical construction crafts in the Moscow Kremlin Building Commission, then headed by Kremlin Administrator Pyotr Stepanovich Valuev (1743–1814). Later, Tyrin studied architecture under Domenico Giliardi. Since 1816, Tyurin was involved in temporary repairs of the old Great Kremlin Palace, first under Ivan Mironovsky (1774–1860), then under Vasily Stasov.

=== Arkhangelskoye Estate (1817–1830s) ===
Prince Nikolay Yusupov, who replaced late Valuev as the Kremlin Administrator, assigned Tyurin to assist in rebuilding his Arkhangelskoye estate, damaged in 1812. Tyrin joined a team of architects, initially led by Joseph Bove. Later, after an accidental fire in 1829, he was the sole architect rebuilding Arkhangelskoye. His most valuable, undisputed extant input is the 1818 “Caprice” (Little Palace), restored in 1970 to Tyurin’s original drafts.

=== Kolomenskoye (1820s) ===
Original wooden Kolomenskoye Palace was torn down in the age of Catherine II. In the 1820s, Tyurin was assigned to rebuild the Palace. His design mixed traditional Neoclassical order with irregular composition of the old Palace, crowned with various towers and tented roofs. Tsar Nicholas I eventually dismissed Tyurin when his structure was already topped out, and installed Andrei Stackenschneider to rebuild it anew. In the end, Tyurin’s structure was abandoned and demolished. Tyurin is also credited with the extant Lipki Pavilion and repairs of Kazan Church.

=== Kritsky Affair (1826) ===
In 1826, Tyurin's younger brothers, Daniil and Nikolay, were involved in so-called Kritsky Brothers Circle, a group of six "revolutionary" students aged 17 to 21. Tsar Nicholas personally dispatched Daniil to Schlisselburg prison, without trial and without any definite term of punishment. Yevgraph's career was damaged, nearly to the point of personal bankruptcy; he had to sell his house in Znamenka Street (now, badly rebuilt, it belongs to Shilov Gallery).

=== University Expansion (1833–1836) ===
Main University hall, restored in 1817–1819 by Domenico Giliardi after the Fire of Moscow (1812), immediately required expansion. Nicholas I arranged buyout of adjacent, incomplete Pashkov House (not to be confused with the surviving Pashkov House, part of the Russian State Library, assigning the project to Tyurin. The new structure became Auditorium Building, flanked by University Library (left) and Saint Tatiana church, right. Tyurin had a talent of building urban public buildings with a spirit of country palaces, opposed to the practical looks of Giliardi and Kazakov’s designs. The corner rotunda church of St.Tatiana, designed as the visual anchor of University, was destroyed in 1919 and restored in the 1990s (photo and schedule).

=== Elokhovo Cathedral (1837–1845) ===
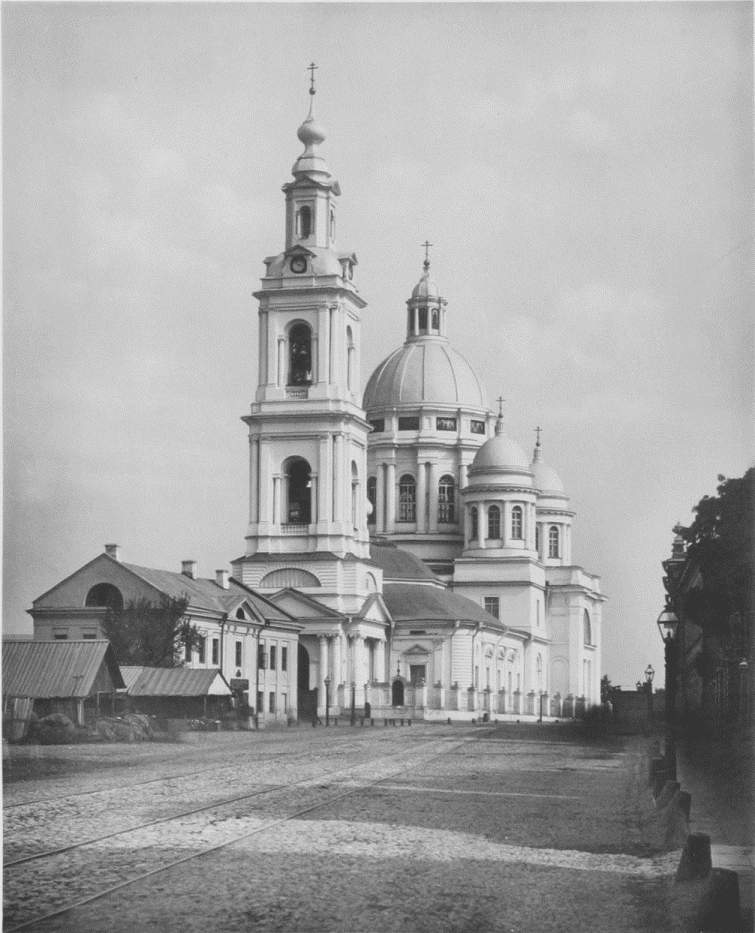
Elokhovo, 1882 photograph

Tyrin's Cathedral stands on the site of an older church built in the 1720s, famous as the site of Alexander Pushkin baptism. Tyurin’s role was forgotten until 1923, when V.V.Zgura found architect’s original records in the church archive, and now Elokhovo is credited to Yevgraph Tyurin alone. The church is known as "the last, ideologically, statement of a great era in arts, Russian Empire" (Zgura: "идеологически последний архитектурный памятник великой художественной эпохи – русского ампира"), since in 1838 Nicholas I mandated use of Konstantin Thon's Byzantine eclectics (see Russian Revival). Tyurin's design is not free from eclectics, too, as is seen from excessive decoration of main dome drum and portico.

=== Disputed works ===
Tyurin's work on the Neskuchnoe Palace in Moscow, under his old mentor Ivan Mironovsky, is a well-known fact, but his actual personal input to this project is not clear. Tyurin was also credited with the Trinity Church of Danilov Monastery, which is now attributed to Joseph Bove.

=== Art collection ===
Tyurin, collecting art since the 1820s, had a vision of a public art gallery in Moscow which became his idée fixe. Later, when he negotiated donating his collection to Moscow University, he estimated its size at 415 paintings — of Italian, Dutch and Russian masters. Tyurin used to take fees in paintings, not money; in the end of his life, he sold the treasure and it dispersed. He died and was buried in Tula.
