= Afanasy Grigoriev =

Russian Neoclassical architect

Afanasy Grigoriev Афанасий Григорьев
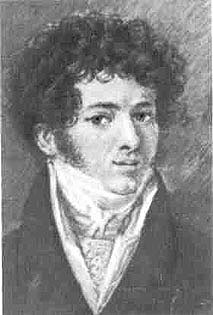
- Afanasy Grigoriev, portrait c. 1800
- Born: 21 January 1782; Vasilievskaya, Tambov Governorate, Russian Empire
- Died: 13 May 1868 (aged 86); Moscow, Russian Empire
- Occupation: Architect
- Practice: Giliardi Family and independent own practice
- Buildings: Khrushyov House (now Alexander Pushkin museum)
- Projects: Ershovo Estate (near Zvenigorod)

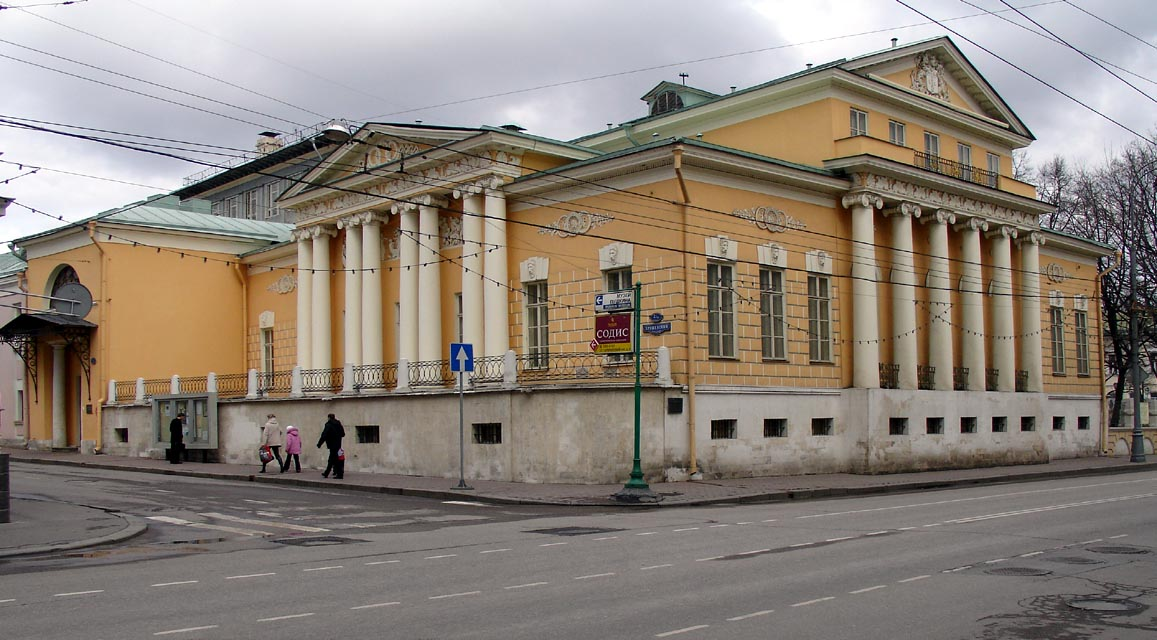
Khrushyov House, now Alexander Pushkin Museum

Afanasy Grigorievich Grigoriev (Russian: Афанасий Григорьевич Григорьев; 21 January 1782 – 13 May 1868) was a Russian Neoclassical architect, who worked in Moscow and its suburbs. Grigoriev is remembered for his refined Empire style mansions, completion of Great Ascension Church (which, unfinished, housed the wedding of Alexander Pushkin in 1831) and assistance to Domenico Gilardi in rebuilding Moscow after the Great Fire of 1812.

== Biography ==
Grigoriev was born a serf, owned by the Kretov family, and acquired freedom at the age of 22. By this time, he was a long-time apprentice to Moscow-based Gilardi family of Swiss architects. Giovanni Gilardi was the chief architect of continuously expanding Moscow Orphanage, Widow's House (public almshouse) and Catherine's Institute; his son, Domenico Gilardi, inherited the family practice and managed rebuilding of these and other public structures after the devastating Fire of 1812.

Grigoriev, like Domenico, studied architecture and crafts in Francesco Camporesi workshop in Moscow Kremlin. In 1808-1847, Grigoriev was formally employed by the Widow's House, first as assistance to the Gilardis, then as the chief architect of this institution. Grigoriev worked for (or with) the Gilardis on all of their Moscow projects, growing from an apprentice to lead architect. He and Domenico Gilardi usually receive equal credit on their joint 1820s buildings, including Sukhanovo and Vlakhernskoye-Kuzminki. Grigoriev's own, undisputed, work can be found in Prechistenka Street, where he built two extant, adjacent upper-class houses.

The first, a city estate of Alexander Khrushyov, is noted for a complex plan that integrates two different facades - a stern Ionic order facing Prechistenka and an ornate, joyful facade with double Ionic columns and a raised terrace overlooking Khruschyovsky Lane. The building houses Alexander Pushkin museum since 1957.

The second, a symmetrical Lopukhin (later Stanitsky) House, also employing Ionic order, houses Leo Tolstoy museum. Both buildings retained all original exterior and some of interior artwork, and are rated as finest examples of Moscow Empire style.

His most important project out of Moscow is the Ershovo estate near Zvenigorod. The Trinity Cathedral (1826–1828), destroyed in World War II, was rebuilt in 1990s (photo photo).

Grigoriev died in Moscow and was buried at extant Kalitniki Cemetery. Church of this cemetery, sometimes credited to Grigoriev by mistake, was actually built by N.I. Kozlovsky

== Buildings ==
Assistant to Giovanni Gilardi:

- 1800s-1812: Widows' House improvements, Kudrinskaya Square
- 1800s: The Orphanage improvements, Moskvoretskaya Embankment
- 1804-1812: Catherine's Institute, Kommuny Square

Assistant or partner to Domenico Gilardi:

- 1813-1817: Catherine's Institute (completion)
- 1817-1819: Moscow State University reconstruction
- 1823-1826: Board of Trustees (Опекунский Совет), Solyanka Street
- 1829-1831: Usachev House
- 1820s: Sukhanovo palace improvements (with Joseph Bové, Adam Menelaws and other architects)

Own, undisputed design:

- 1814-18??: Khruschyov House (later Seleznyov House), Prechistenka Street, (sculpture by Ivan Vitali)
- 1817-1822: Lopukhin House (later Stanitsky House), Prechistenka Street
- 1824-1826: Trinity Church in Veshnyaki (www.pravoslavie.ru)
- 1826-1828: Trinity Church, Ershovo near Zvenigorod, destroyed 1941, rebuilt 1990s
- 1837: Ershovo Palace
- 1842-1843: Own house, Milyutindsky Lane, 8

Other work:

- 1819-1821: Dokuchaev House, Myasnitskaya Street
- 1820s: Razumovsky House, Gorokhovaya Street (reconstruction of a building designed by Adam Menelaws)
- 1845: Great Ascencion Church, Nikitskie Gates, Moscow - completion of an earlier work by Joseph Bové and other architects
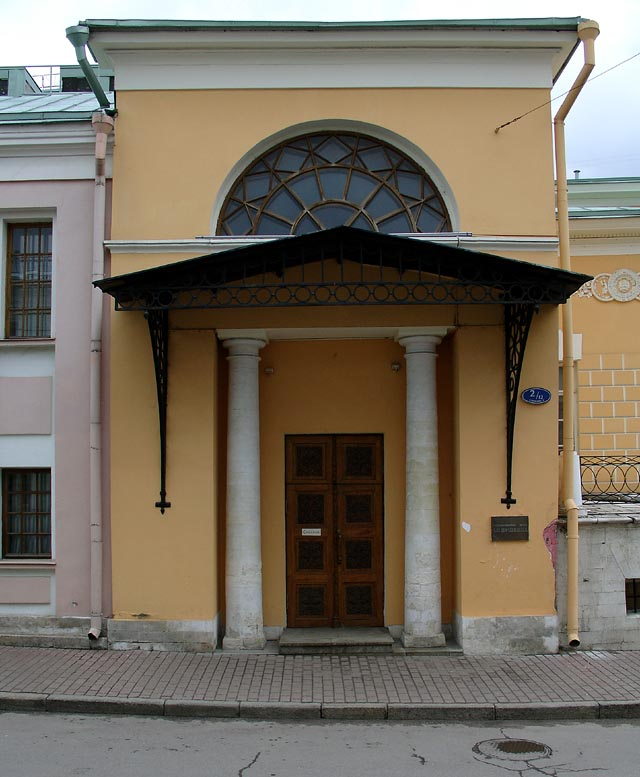
Khrushyov mansion, side portal

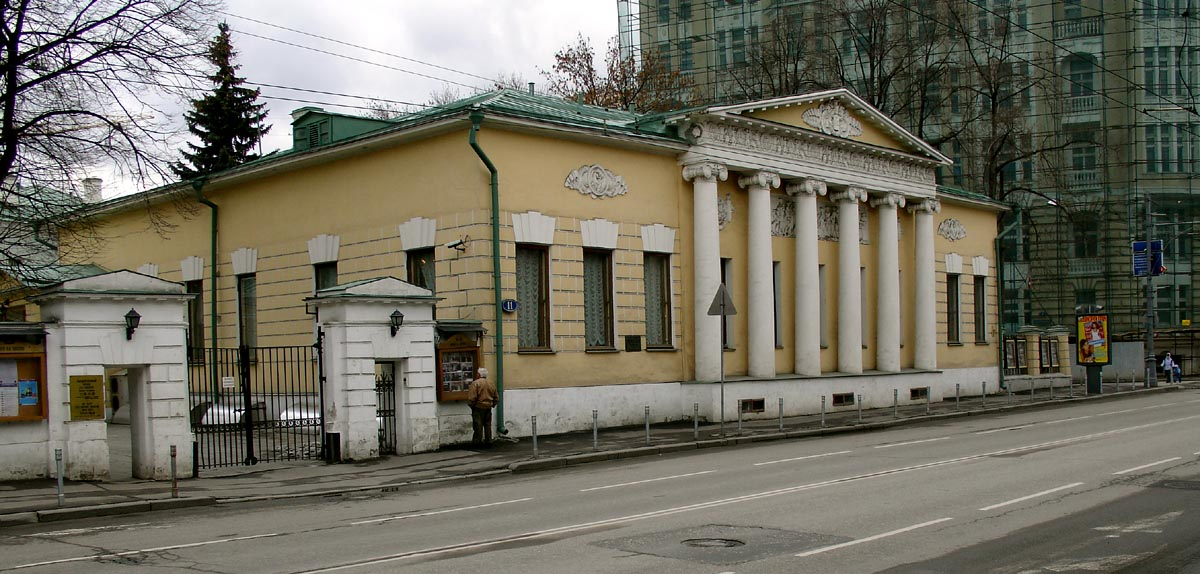
Lopukhin mansion, now Leo Tolstoy museum

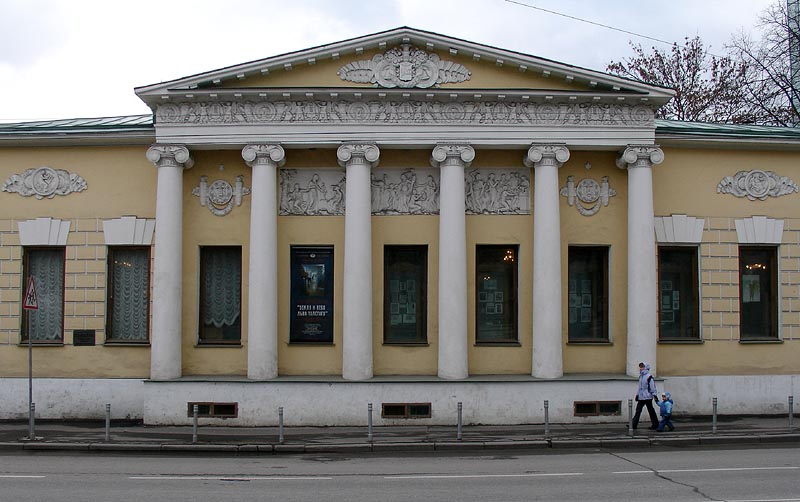
Lopukhin mansion, facade

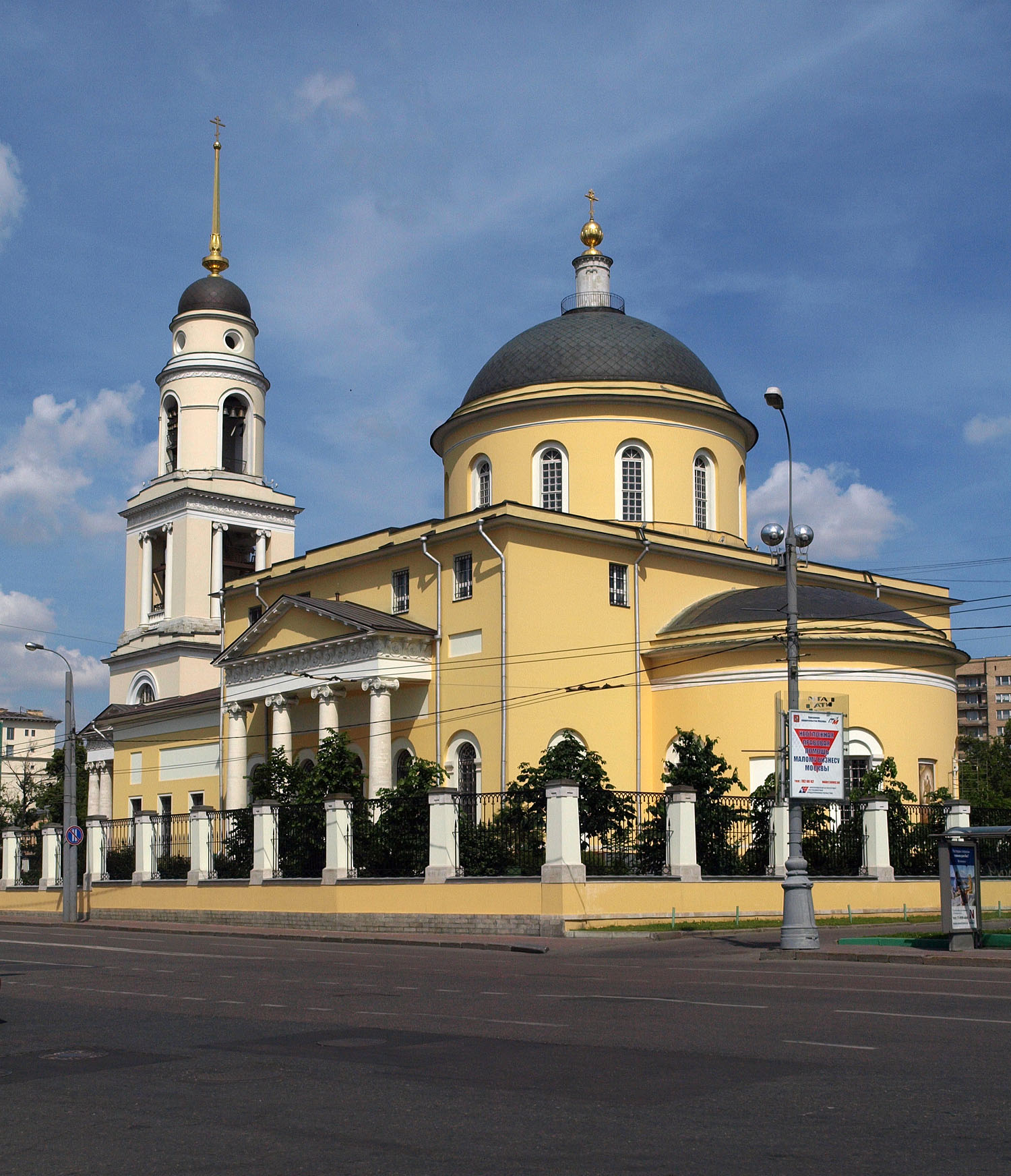
Great Ascension Church, by Joseph Bové, completion by Grigoriev
