= Embassy Row (disambiguation) =

Embassy Row is a section of Massachusetts Avenue in Washington, D.C., United States.

Embassy Row may also refer to:

- Embassy Row, Ottawa, the eastern part of the Sandy Hill neighbourhood
- Embassy Row (production company), television production company
- "Embassy Row", a song from the album Brighten the Corners by the band Pavement
