= Yelokhovo Cathedral =

Russian religious building

Epiphany Cathedral at Yelokhovo
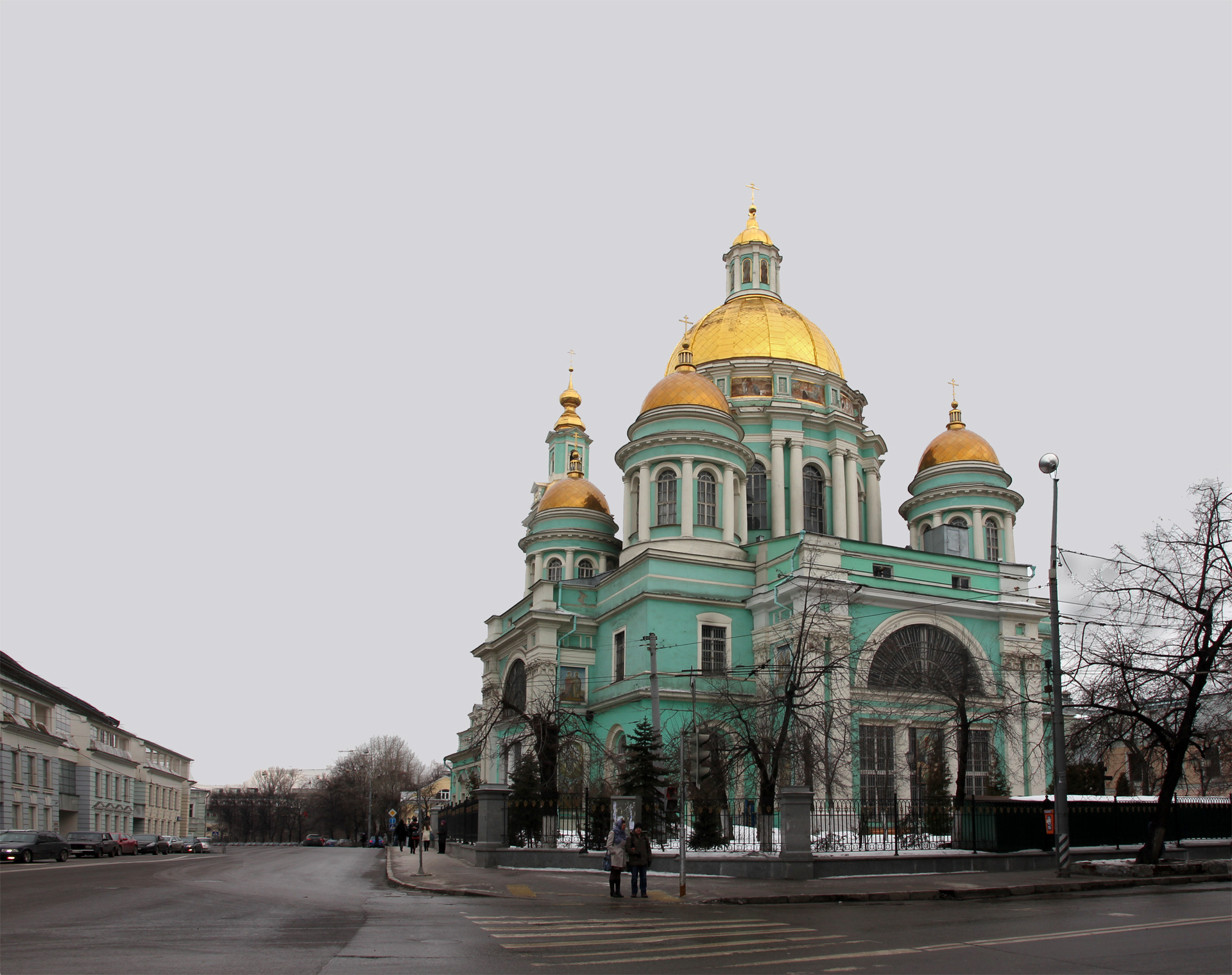
- The church

Religion
- Affiliation: Russian Orthodox
- District: Urban Diocese of Moscow
- Rite: Byzantine
- Status: Operational

Location
- Municipality: Moscow
- State: Russia
- Interactive map of Epiphany Cathedral at Yelokhovo
- Coordinates: 55°46′21″N 37°40′28″E

Architecture
- Architect: Yevgraph Tyurin
- Groundbreaking: 1837
- Completed: 1845
- Dome: Five

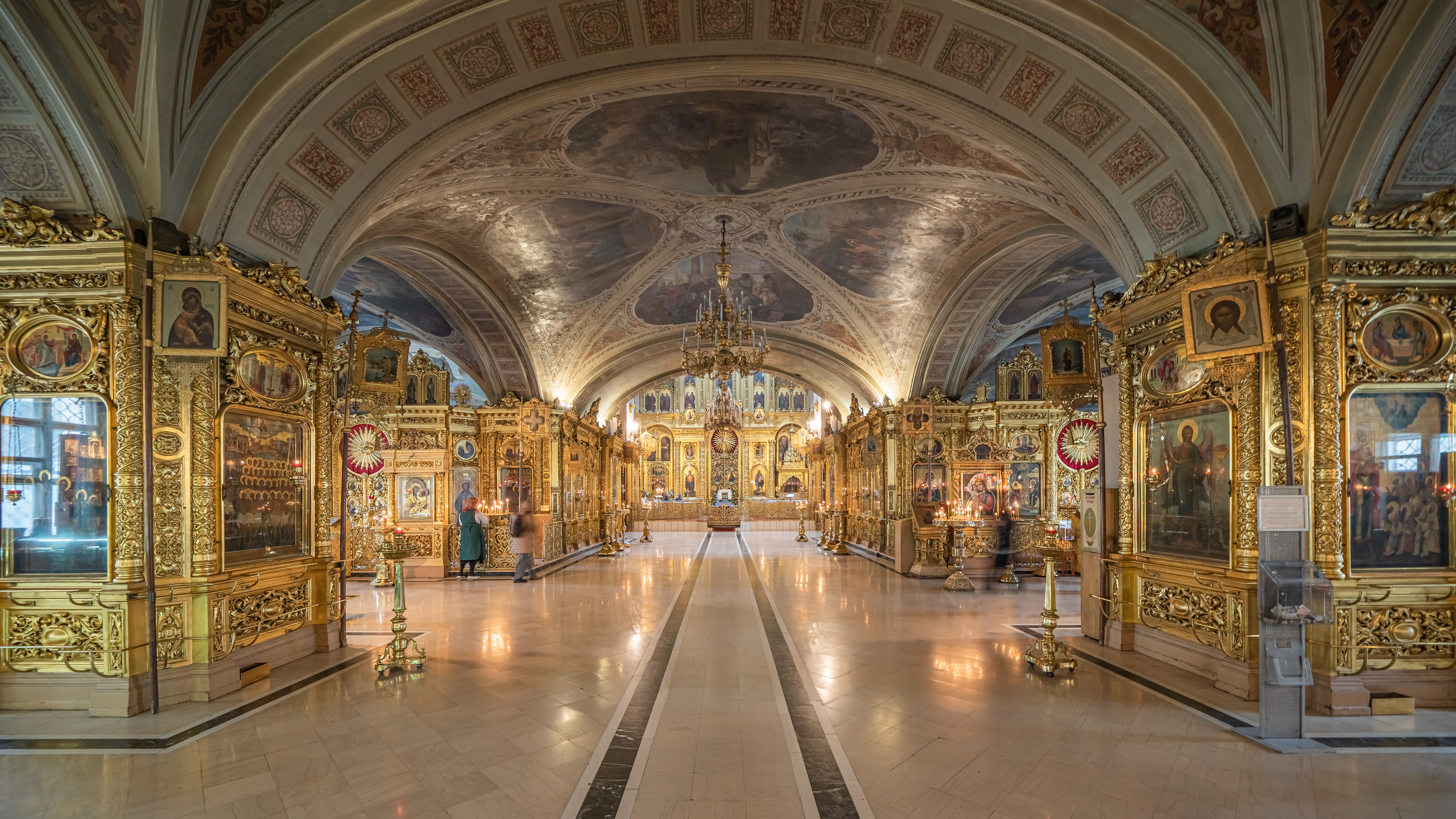
The cathedral's interior

The Epiphany Cathedral at Yelokhovo (Russian: Богоявленский собор в Елохове), Moscow, is the vicarial church of the Moscow Patriarchs. The surviving building was designed and built by Yevgraph Tyurin in 1837–1845.

The original church in the village of Yelokhovo near Moscow was built in 1722-31 for Tsarevna Praskovia Ivanovna. It was there that Alexander Pushkin was baptized in 1799. In 1790 a refectory with a four-tier belfry was built.

The present structure was erected in 1837-1845 to a Neoclassical design by Yevgraph Tyurin. The architecture is typical for the late Empire style, with some elements of European eclectics. The riotous opulence of the interior decoration is due to a restoration undertaken in 1912.

Upon closing the Kremlin Cathedrals (1918) and the subsequent destruction of both the Cathedral of Christ the Savior (1931) and the Dorogomilovo Cathedral (1938), the chair of Russian Orthodox Church was moved to Yelokhovo, the largest remaining open church in Moscow. The enthronements of Patriarchs Sergius I (1943), Alexius I (1945), Pimen (1970), and Alexius II (1990) took place there.

The church has been well-maintained, even in the Soviet era, and is known to have a 1970 air conditioning system using deep subterranean water from a 250 meters (820 ft)-deep artesian aquifer.

The Christmas and Easter night services, which featured President Boris Yeltsin and Patriarch Alexius II, were aired on national television until the consecration of the rebuilt Cathedral of Christ the Savior in 2000.

The main altar is devoted to the Epiphany and the Baptism of Jesus. The cathedral has two side-chapels: the left one of Saint Nicholas and the right one of the Annunciation. The most popular shrines of the cathedral are those that house the relics of St. Alexius of Moscow and a 17th-century copy of the Kazan Icon of the Mother of God.

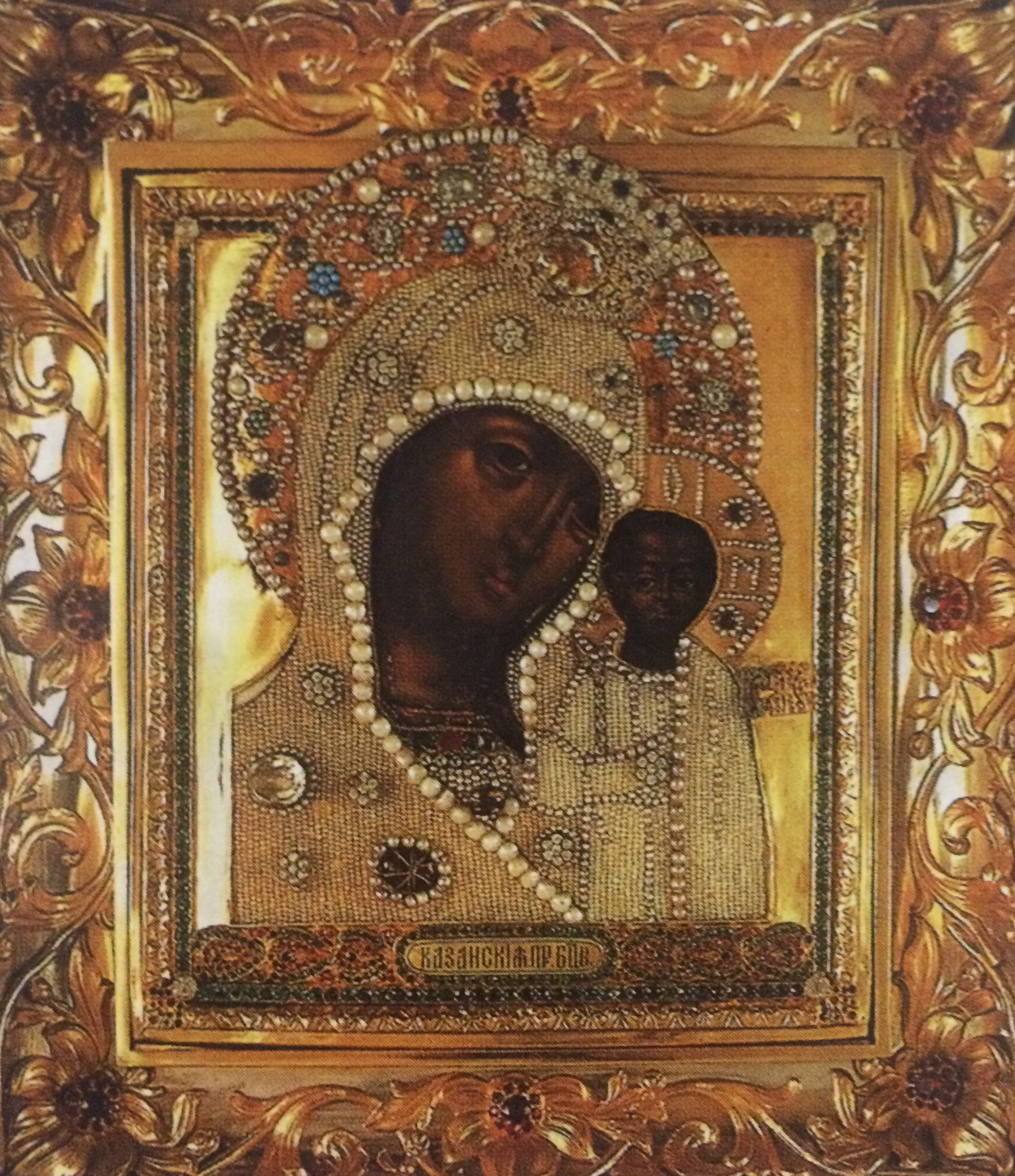
17-century copy of the Kazan icon of the Mother of God

== Burials ==
- May 1944 - Patriarch Sergius I of Moscow; the granite tomb is by Alexey Shchusev
- 9 December 2008 - Patriarch Alexy II of Russia.
