= Lopukhin =

Lopukhin (Russian: Лопухин, from лопух meaning burdock) is a Russian masculine surname, its feminine counterpart is Lopukhina. Notable people with the surname include:

- nobles from the Lopukhin family
- Aleksandr Lopukhin (1852–1904), Russian Bible commentator

== See also ==
- Lopukhov
