= Domenico Gilardi =

Swiss architect (1785–1845)

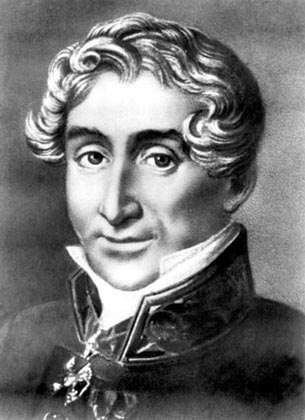
- Born: 4 June 1785; Montagnola, Duchy of Milan
- Died: 26 February 1845 (aged 59); Milan, Lombardy–Venetia, Austrian Empire
- Occupation: Architect
- Practice: Gilardi family
- Buildings: The Orphanage, Widows House, Catherine's Institute, Kuzminki Estate in Moscow, Russia
- Projects: Reconstruction of public buildings in Moscow after the Great Fire of 1812

Domenico Gilardi (Russian: Доменико Жилярди; 1785–1845) was a Swiss Italian architect who worked primarily in Moscow, Russia in Neoclassicist style. He was one of the key architects charged with rebuilding the city after the Fire of 1812. Gilardi's legacy survives in public buildings like Moscow Orphanage, Widows’ House, Catherine's Institute and the Old Hall of Moscow University.

== Early life ==
The Gilardi family of architects, originally from Ticino, established itself in Russia in the middle of the 18th century. Domenico's father Giovanni, also known as Ivan Dementievich, was well known in Moscow. Domenico was born in Montagnola and lived there until his mother brought him to Russia in 1796.

Domenico longed for a career in painting, so in 1799, his father sent him to an Italian workshop in St. Petersburg. After the death of Paul I, dowager Empress Maria Feodorovna awarded him a scholarship, and eventually a state-financed study tour to Italy. From 1803 to 1810 Domenico studied art in Milan, Florence, Venice and Rome.

Domenico returned to Russia in June 1810, and in January 1811 joined his father, who was the architect of the enormous Moscow Orphanage (Russian: Воспитательный дом, Foundling House). The first two stages of this enormous structure, conceived by educator Ivan Betzkoy, were completed in 1764-1781 and required continuous additions and improvements. Domenico remained in the employ of the Orphanage for the rest of his career.

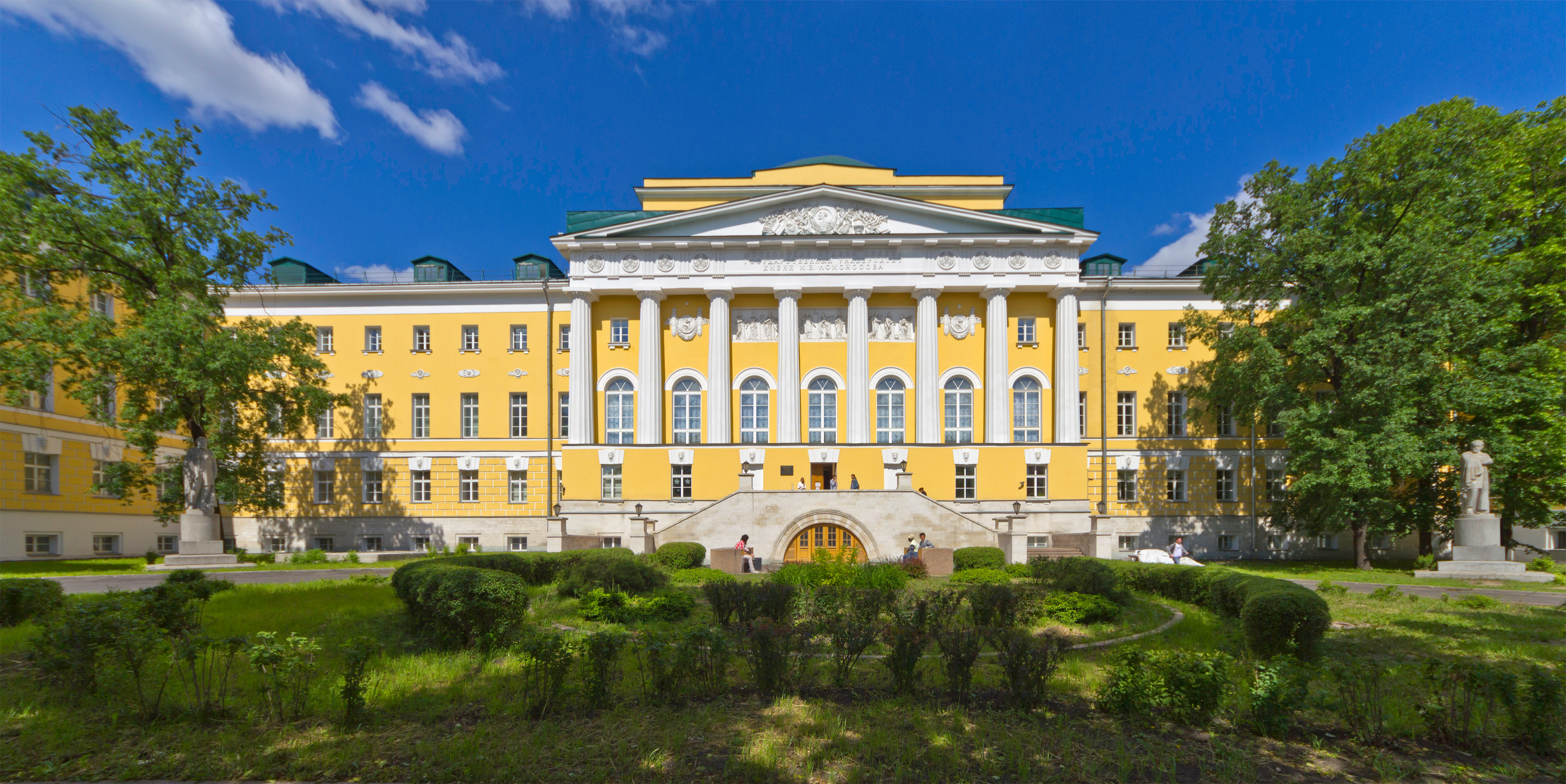
Moscow University, as rebuilt by Giiardi

== Professional career ==
In 1812, after the Battle of Borodino, Gilardis fled Moscow. The city burnt down in September 1812, the disaster creating a wealth of opportunity for architects. In 1813, Domenico joined the Kremlin Building Commission, restoring Ivan the Great Bell Tower and other war losses. In 1817, his father retired and returned to Ticino; Domenico inherited his job as lead architect of The Orphanage.

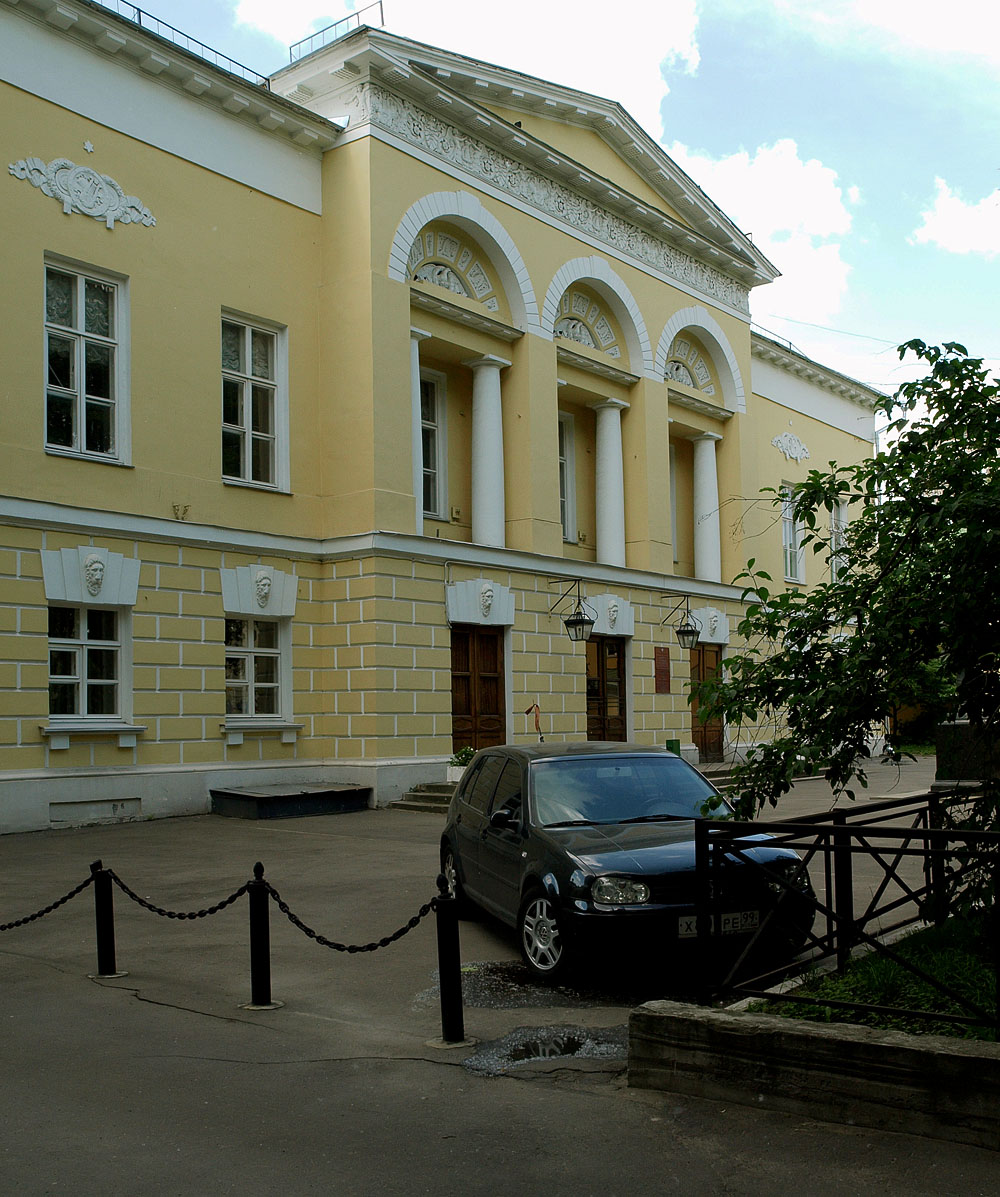
Gagarin House, 25 Povarskaya Street, Moscow

In 1817-1819 he completed his first independent job, the reconstruction of Matvei Kazakov’s University in Mokhovaya Street. Gilardi retained the basic floorplan, but considerably changed exterior styling. In 1818, he also received commissions to rebuild the Widows’ House (Вдовий Дом) and Catherine's Institute (Екатерининское училище). In a very short time, Gilardi concentrated the efforts to restore the four largest public buildings in the city, with the aid of Afanasy Grigoriev, a recently emancipated serf architect.

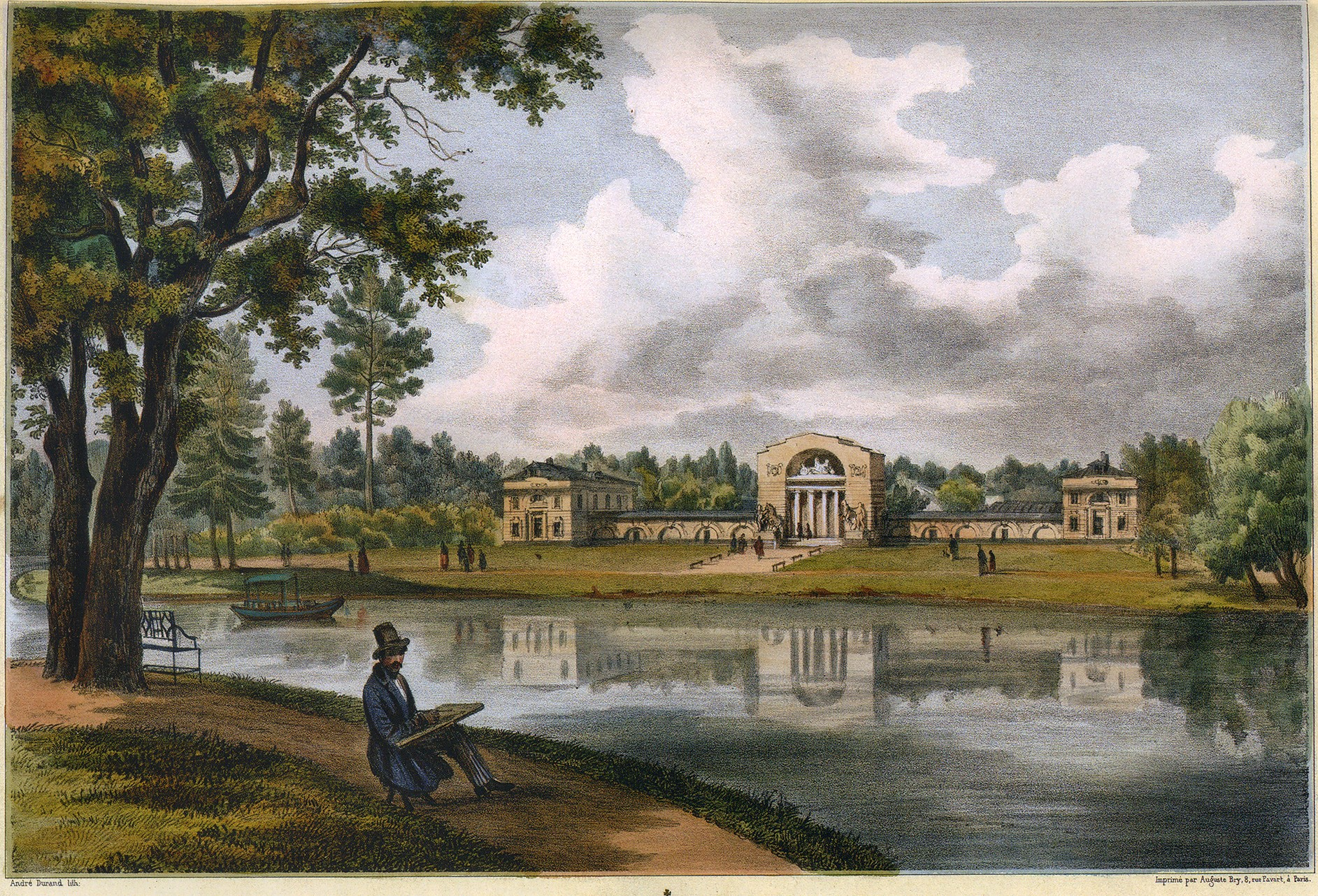
Riding Court, Kuzminki Park (now within Moscow limits)

Gilardi's style goes back to the Milan variety of Empire Classicism, Luigi Cagnola and in particular Antonio Antolini's Bonaparte Forum. Grigoriev later followed the same canon. Gilardi's architectural talent is disputed, but his success in construction management and ability to lead concurrent major projects is unquestionable.

His first work in new construction was the Board of Trustees building, a new block on the Orphanage lot (Solyanka Street, now Academy of Medical Science). It was followed by private commissions from the Gagarin (Povarskaya street) and Golitsyn (Kuzminki Estate, 1820–1832) families. In 1826–1832, Gilardi supervised the rebuilding of Slobodskoy Palace in Lefortovo, a subsidiary of the Orphanage. Grigoriev replaced him when Gilardi travelled to Europe and back.

After less than twenty years of active practice, Gilardi retired and left for Switzerland in 1832. Back home, he completed only one project – a chapel near Montagnola.

Giliardi's students and junior partners continued work in Moscow:

- Afanasy Grigoriev (1782–1868)
- Alessandro Gilardi (1808–1871)
- Yevgraph Tyurin (1792–1870)

== Notable buildings ==
New Construction

- 1814-1822 Lunin House (Nikitskie Vorota Square)
- 1820-1822 Gagarin House (25, Povarskaya Street)
- 1820-1832 Kuzminki Estate: Riding Court, Manor, Services
- 1823-1826 Trustees House at The Orphanage (14a, Solyanka Street)
- 1829-1831 Usachev House (Zemlyanoy Val Street)

Reconstruction

- 1813-1817 - Kremlin: assistant architect for Ivan the Great bell tower
- 1817-1819 - Moscow University
- 1818-1824 - Catherine's Institute (present-day Suvorov Square, Moscow)
- 1818-1823 - Widow's House (Kudrinskaya Square)
- 1826-1832 - Slobodskoy Palace (Lefortovo)
