= Joseph Bové =

Russian neoclassical architect (1784–1834)

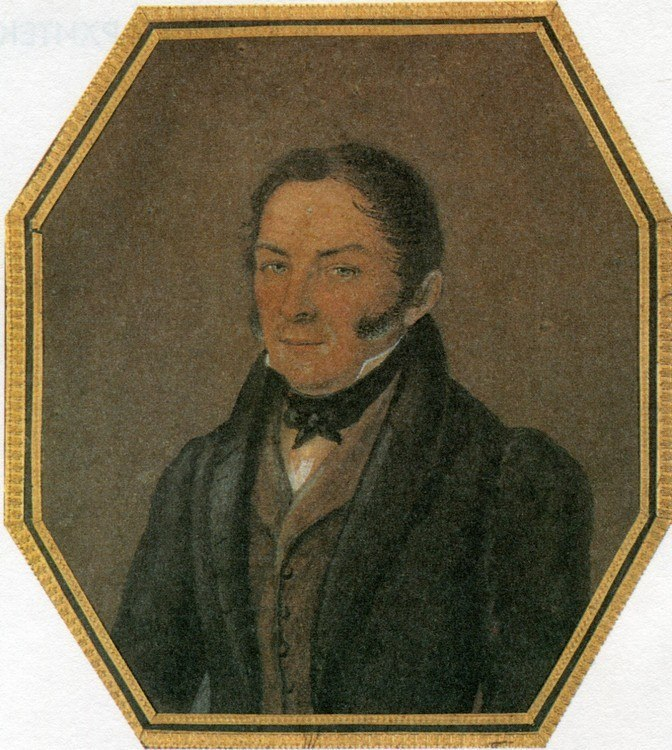
- Portrait, early 19th century
- Born: 4 November [O.S. 24 October] 1784; Saint Petersburg, Russia
- Died: 28 June [O.S. 16 June] 1834 (aged 49); Moscow, Russia
- Occupation: Architect
- Buildings: Triumphal Arch of Moscow
- Projects: Theatre Square, Moscow

Joseph Bové, also Joseph Jean-Baptiste Charles de Beauvais or Osip Ivanovich Bove (Russian: Осип Иванович Бове; 4 November [O.S. 24 October] 1784 — 28 June [O.S. 16 June] 1834), was an Italian-Russian neoclassical architect who supervised the reconstruction of Moscow after it was destroyed by fire in 1812.

== Biography ==
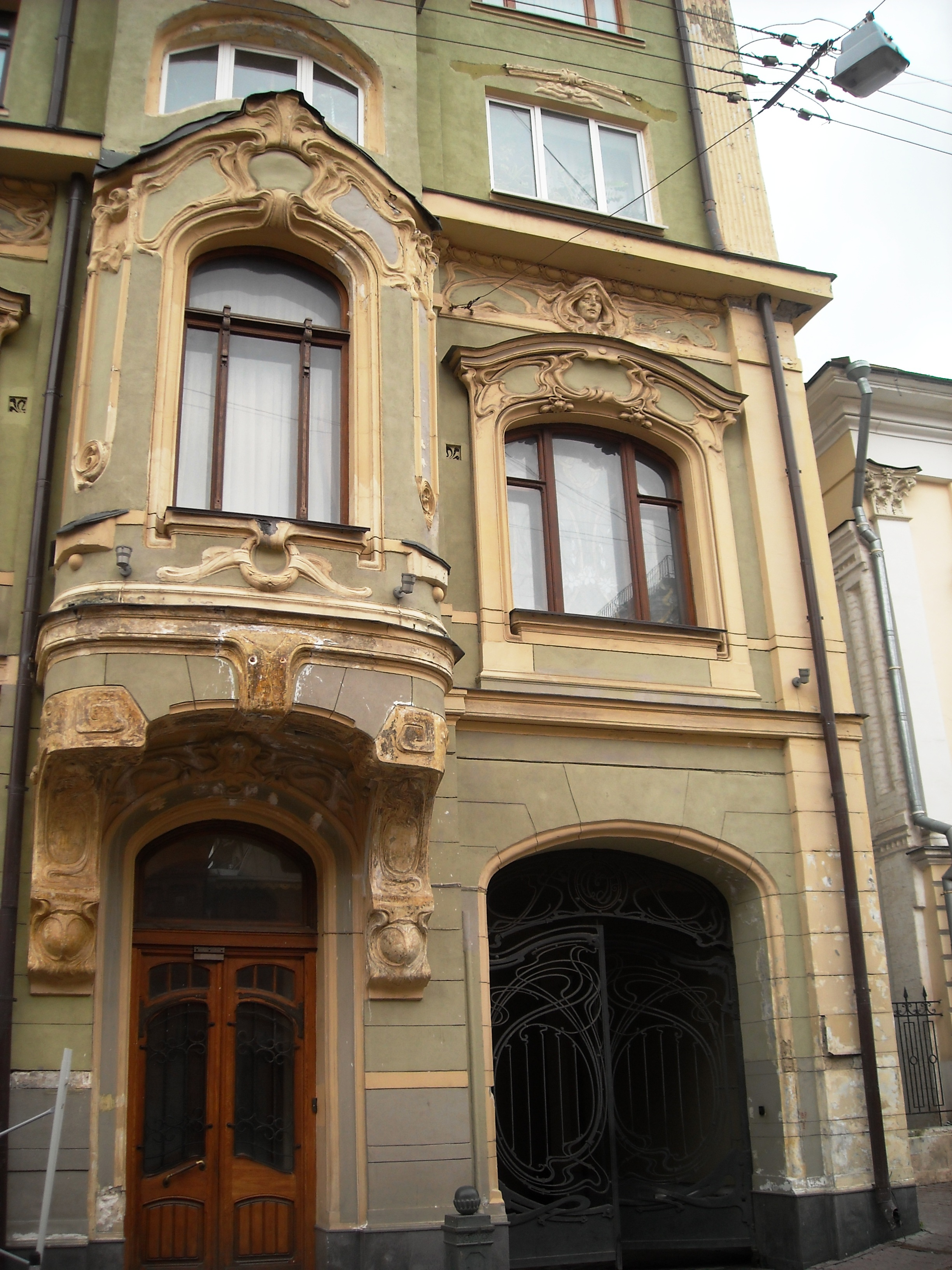
A Joseph Bové house at n° 8, Petrovskij Pereulok, Moscow

Bové was born in St. Petersburg in the family of Vincenzo Giovanni Bova, a painter from Naples who settled in Russia in 1782. He had two younger brothers, Michaele and Alessandro, who also trained in architecture and later became his associates. Soon after Joseph's birth, the family moved to Moscow. From 1802 to 1807, he studied architecture. Starting in 1807 he worked as an assistant to Matvei Kazakov and Carlo Rossi in Moscow and Tver. As a full-time employee of the Expedition, he was involved in various Kremlin maintenance jobs. In 1813, after the 1812 fire that razed most of the city, Bové was hired by the Moscow Building Commission and assigned to lead the "Facade Department", responsible for the approval of new facade designs and for enforcing the placement of new buildings according to the new master plan's street lines. The plan, however, was not finalized until 1817. Private builders were so numerous that Bové and the city failed to control them. Emperor Alexander, visiting Moscow, was enraged to see buildings painted in all kinds of colors, especially deep red and dark green, and issued a decree that limited the city palette to modest, pale colours.

While the Giliardi Family was rebuilding major public buildings like Moscow State University, Bové was in charge of designing and rebuilding the new Central Squares of Moscow and Red Square. His best known project, Theatre Square, was completed in 1825, however both Bolshoi Theater and Maly Theater were subsequently rebuilt, and the square lost its neoclassical symmetry. In fact, most of his buildings were demolished by accidents or real estate developers:

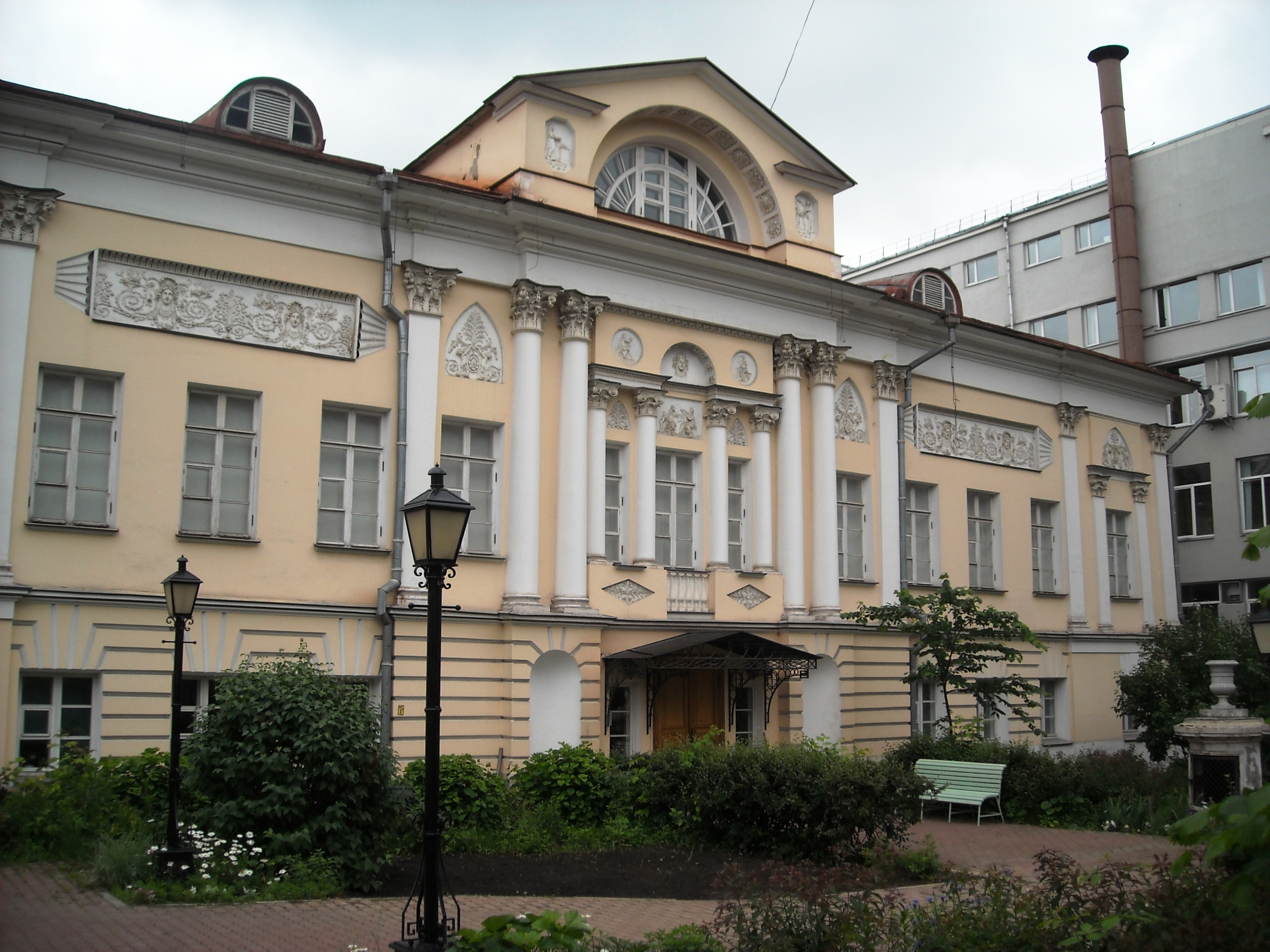
Trubetskoy Mansion, Petrovskij Pereulok, Moscow, designed by Joseph Bové

- Trade Rows in Red Square (1815), with a rotunda dome mirroring the dome of Kazakov's Kremlin Senate, were demolished in the 1880s to make way for the larger Upper Trading Rows.
- Gagarin family mansion in Novinsky Boulevard was destroyed by an air raid in 1941.
- Triumphal Arch by Tverskaya Zastava (1827–1834) was demolished in 1938; a replica was built in the 1960s in Dorogomilovo District.
- Listed memorial building at Tverskoy Boulevard, 26 and nearby was razed by Konstantin Ernst's development company in 2003-2005.

In 1824 and 1825, he participated in the reconstruction of Moscow Manege. He designed numerous private mansions in Moscow, but his most famous work remains the Bolshoi Theatre. Extant buildings include:

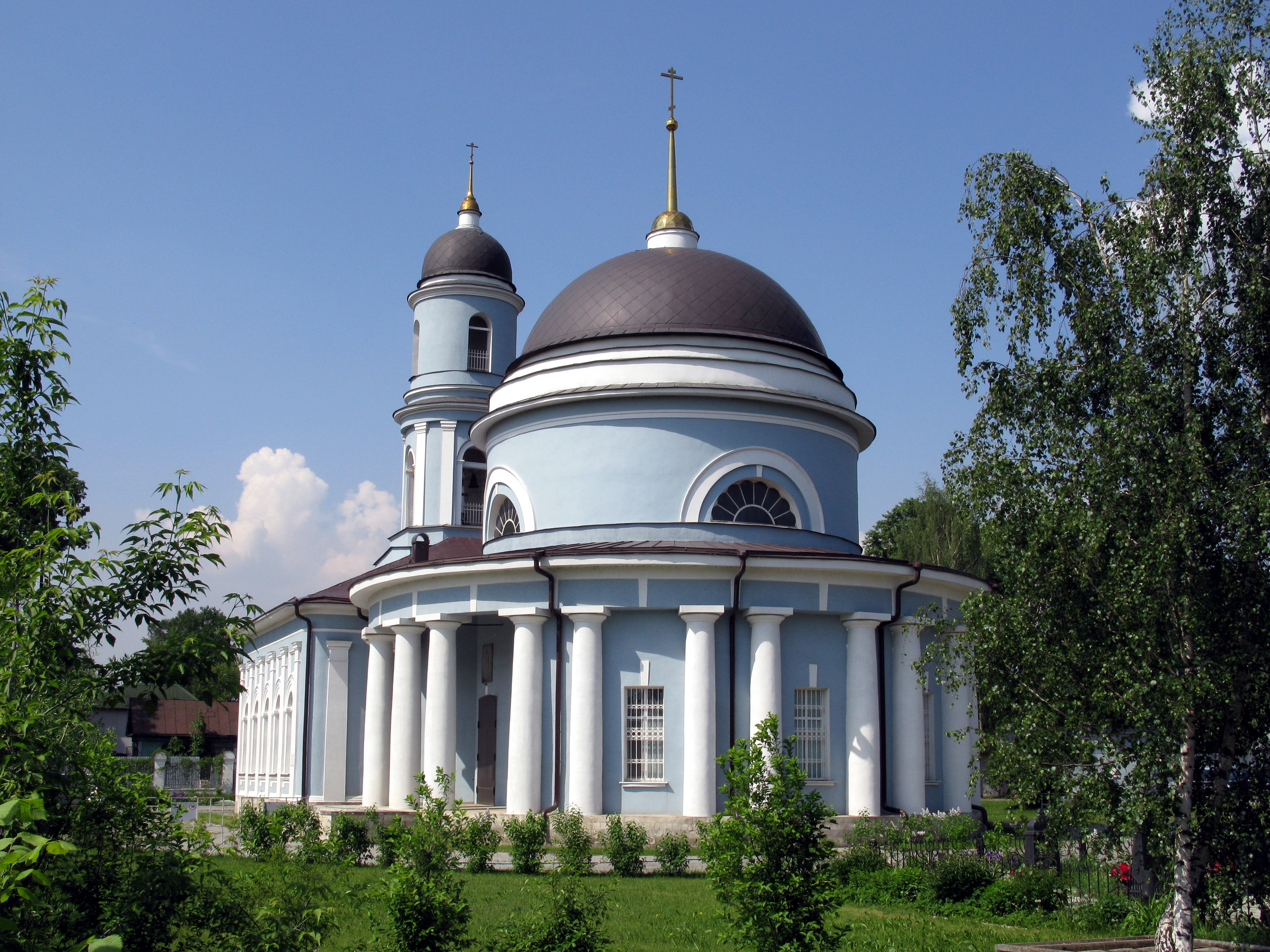
The Intercession Church in Balashikha

- The Intercession Church in Balashikha
- 37, Myasnitskaya Street
- Catherine's Hospital in Strastnoy Boulevard
- Military school and barracks in Lefortovo District
- First City Hospital in present-day Leninsky Prospekt
- Two small mansions on the Garden Ring (15, Sadovo-Kudrinskaya)

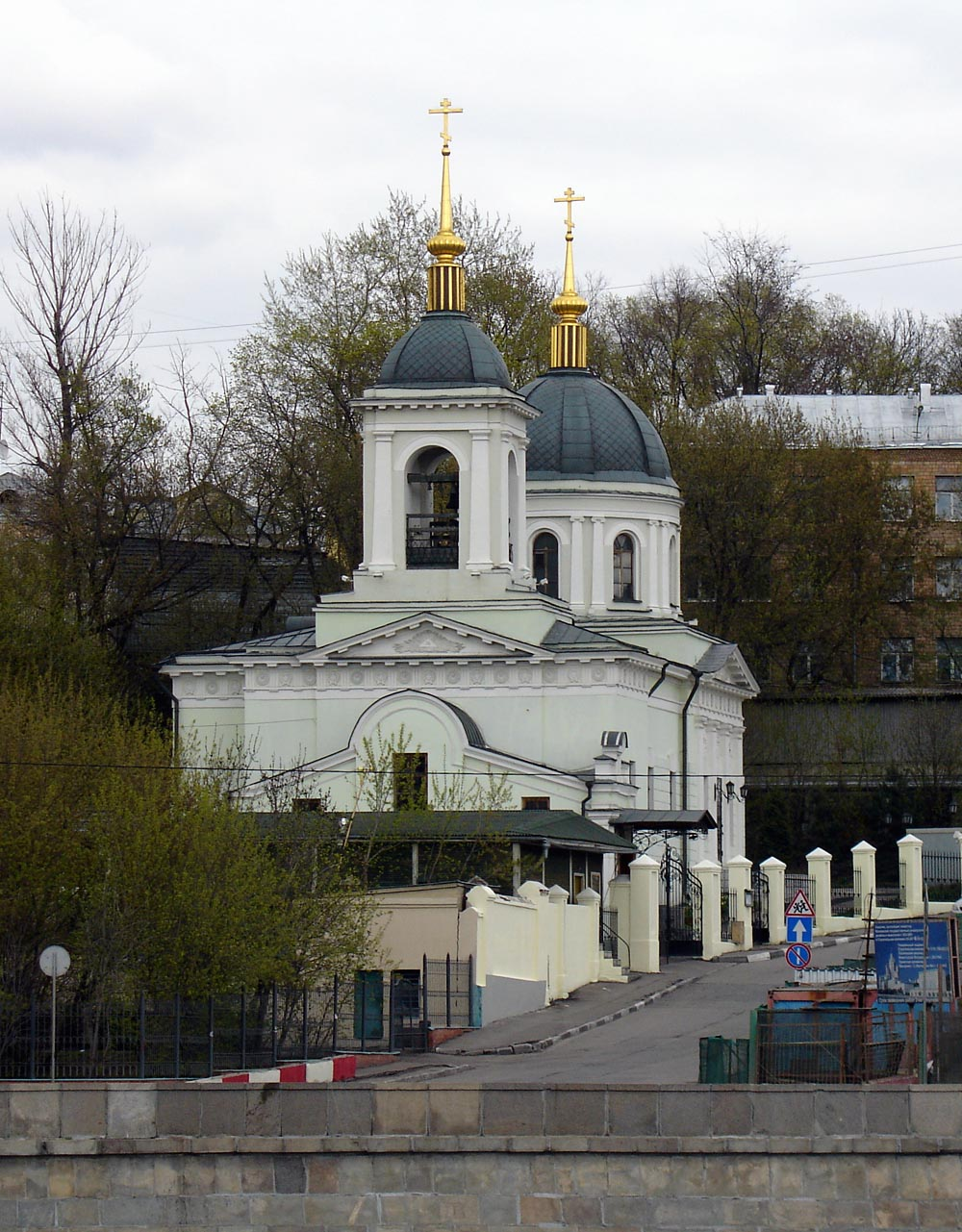
Church of St.Nicholas in Kotelniki by Joseph Bové

- Church of St.Nicholas in Kotelniki by Joseph Bové (on Kotelnicheskaya Embankment)
- His last work, Church of Theotokos, "Joy of all who Sorrow" on Bolshaya Ordynka Street (1831–1836)

== Death ==
Bové died in Moscow on 28 June [O.S. 16 June] 1834, aged 49, and was interred at the Donskoy Monastery. (Note: The Russian Biographical Dictionary indicates that he died on 2 August [O.S. 21 July] 1834.)

== Sources ==
- (in Russian) Biography: Покровская, З.К., "Осип Бове", М, Стройиздат, 1999, ISBN 5-274-00592-6
- (in Russian) Official register of memorial buildings in Moscow (Moskomnasledie) at The Academy of State Fire Service (of Russian Ministry of Interior)
