= Matvey Kazakov =

Russian Neoclassical architect (1738–1812)

Matvey Fyodorovich Kazakov
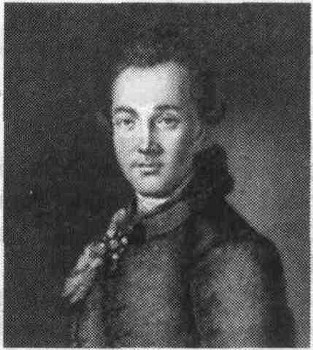
- Born: 1738; Moscow, Russian Empire
- Died: 1812 (aged 73–74); Ryazan, Ryazan Governorate, Russian Empire
- Occupation: Architect
- Buildings: Petrovsky Palace, Kremlin Senate, Moscow University, Golitsyn Hospital, Pavlovskaya Hospital, Butyrka
- Projects: Completion of Tsaritsyno Palace and Park (1796)

Matvey Fyodorovich Kazakov (Russian: Матве́й Фёдорович Казако́в; 1738 – 7 November 1812) was a Russian Neoclassical architect. Kazakov was one of the most influential Muscovite architects during the reign of Catherine II, completing numerous private residences, two royal palaces, two hospitals, Moscow University, and the Kremlin Senate. Most of his works were destroyed by the Fire of 1812; they were later rebuilt with various degrees of alteration.

== Early years ==
Kazakov was born in Moscow. His father was a government clerk and a former serf who earned his freedom by serving in the Navy. When Kazakov was twelve years old, he joined the architectural school of Dmitry Ukhtomsky, where he worked and studied until 1760. After a devastating fire in Tver in 1761, Kazakov was assigned to rebuild Tver as a junior architect under P.R. Nikitin, and dedicated seven years to this project. The Travel, or Transit, Palace was completed by Kazakov in 1767.

== Shadow of Bazhenov ==
In 1768, Kazakov joined Vasili Bazhenov's Great Kremlin Palace project. Both architects were the same age—30 years old—but had very different educations. Bazhenov received a formal European education, while Kazakov learned his trade repairing Kremlin relics and never traveled far from Moscow. His enormous utopian project dragged slowly until its dissolution in 1774. By this time, Kazakov was already working on private orders; architects were in high demand after a 1773 fire razed the wealthy Tverskaya Street.

Kazakov stepped out of Bazhenov's shadow, receiving his first personal royal commission to design a temporary Prechistenka palace for Catherine II. This job brought him a Crown Architect's license (1775) and a steady flow of private orders. In 1775, Kazakov and Bazhenov worked together again on temporary royal pavilions for the celebration of peace with Turkey. These Gothic structures inspired Catherine II to award the architects two independent commissions in Gothic style—Tsaritsyno Palace to Bazhenov and Petrovsky Palace to Kazakov.

== Mature works ==
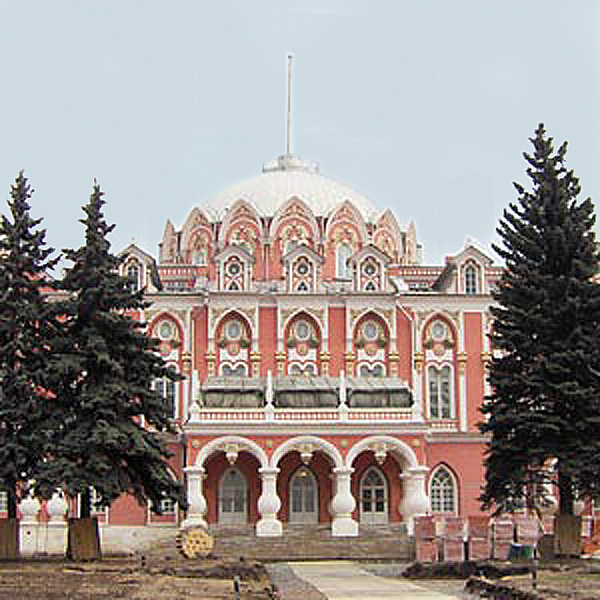
Petrovsky Palace, main hall

Numerous private houses built by Kazakov shaped the city before 1812. These were very simple classicist structures consisting of a symmetrical rectangular core with portico and very modest exterior decoration. "Kazakov's Moscow" disappeared in the fire of 1812; the few surviving houses were later altered, rebuilt, or torn down.

Kazakov's legacy remains in public buildings, country palaces and churches. Kazakov's major works, unlike Bazhenov's and the private houses of his own design, are almost invariably centered on Kazakov's trademark rotunda halls.

Petrovsky Palace or Petroff Palace (Петровский подъездной дворец, "St.Peter's Arrival Palace") was begun in 1776 and officially completed November 3, 1780 (though the works continued for three more years). This palace was intended to be the last overnight station of royal journeys from St. Petersburg to Moscow. Catherine visited once, in 1785; Paul I abandoned it; Napoleon lived in it, and watched the city in flames, but burned it down when he left it. The palace was restored in the 1830s and again in 1874 with minor alterations.

The red-brick castle with white detail originally had two royal apartments on the first floor and plenty of service space on the ground floor. They all converge on a central rotunda hall. The descriptor of "Gothic" is not exactly appropriate here, since Kazakov borrows heavily from Naryshkin Baroque and earlier Russian themes like the oversized bottle-shaped pillars by the main entrance.

The building remained a royal hotel until 1918, but also housed a variety of non-royal residents; Lermontov used to stay in the castle at his friends' apartment. Starting in 1920, the palace housed Zhukovsky Air Force Academy, which vacated the site in the 1990s. As of today, the palace is closed, expecting a massive reconstruction or restoration. City Hall plans to convert it either to a unique luxury hotel or another President's lodge, which may destroy whatever is left by the military. These plans are not yet authorized.

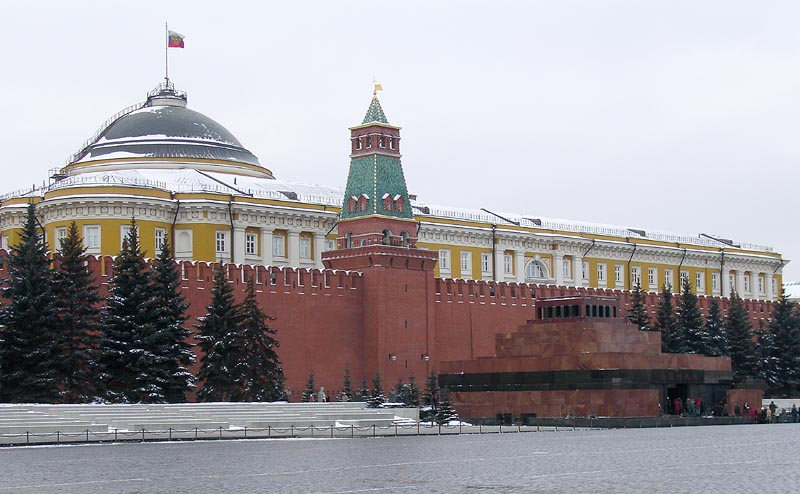
The Kremlin Senate from the Red Square

The Kremlin Senate project was started in 1776 by Karl Blank on a large triangular property in the northern corner of the Kremlin, following a 1775 draft by Kazakov. Blank was demoted in 1779, and Kazakov took the lead. He envisaged the Governing Senate as the Temple of Law. The triangular structure is centered on the Rotunda Hall, which has a diameter of 24.6 meters. Its dome originally carried a St. George statue, then a statue of Justice which was destroyed by French troops in 1812. Later, the state flag flew from the dome, as seen from Red Square, and the dome became a Soviet propaganda icon.

In the 1990s, the Senate was converted to house Russian presidential administration. An indiscriminate reconstruction destroyed Kazakov's interiors. Preservation advocate Alexei Komech reported from the site, "crushed walls, ripped air ducts and piles of 200 year old bricks remind me of wandering around ruins of Berlin in 1946".

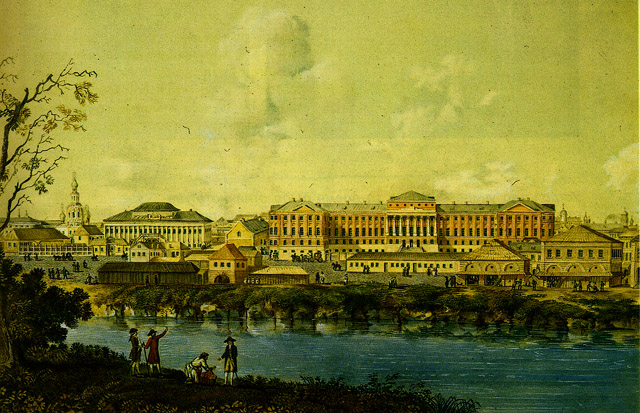
Imperial Moscow University, 1798

Moscow University was built in three stages, beginning in 1784. A reconstruction by Domenico Giliardi after the fire of 1812 changed the exterior to heavy Late Empire style.

Assembly of the Nobility (Благородное собрание, later dubbed "House of Unions", Дом Союзов) was built as a clubhouse between 1784 and 1790. Despite numerous exterior alterations (the last from 1903–1908), the Pillar Hall (Колонный зал, 1784–1787) inside is very close to Kazakov's original. The hall is named after 28 internal Corinthian columns, all wood with white faux marble finish. It has arguably the best acoustics in Moscow and has always been a prime stage for classical music. In the Soviet era, it housed party congresses and Vladimir Lenin's and Joseph Stalin's funeral services.

Golitsyn Hospital (Голицынская больница) was built with a 900,000 rouble private endowment of the late Prince Dmitry Golitsyn (1721–1793), on the condition that the hospital would remain free to all, regardless of wealth or creed. Kazakov was the Golitsyn family's architect. The hospital was begun on July 21, 1796; this time, Bazhenov assisted Kazakov as site manager. With support from the dowager Empress Maria Feodorovna, the first stage was completed by July 22, 1802. In 1812, the 130-bed hospital was spared by fire. It housed the wounded of both French and Russian armies. Later, the First and Second City Hospitals were built nearby. In 1918, all three hospitals were merged and are known today as "First City" (Первая Градская). The central core of the hospital remains very close to Kazakov's original.

Pavlovskaya Hospital (Павловская больница, now "Fourth City Hospital") is the only work of Kazakov's that has remained unaltered over two centuries. Established in 1763, it was the oldest public hospital in Moscow. In 1802, Kazakov started to rebuild the main building in the strict Neoclassicist style; side buildings were added by Giliardi in the 1820s. In the process of construction, Kazakov was indicted for fraud; he was spared from criminal persecution but lost his license, which barred him from state-funded projects.

== Death and legacy ==
In 1806, the ailing Kazakov finally retired from practice. After the Battle of Borodino, Kazakov's children evacuated him to Ryazan. The city burned down in September 1812. Relatives tried to shield him from the news about the fire of Moscow, but eventually the news reached him. Kazakov died at Ryazan on October 26, 1812 (Old Style) and was buried in Ryazan's Trinity Monastery.

Kazakov had three sons, all trained in architecture. Pavel and Vasily died young; Matvey survived his father and died at age 39.

Kazakov's most successful students and assistants were Joseph Bové, Ivan Yegotov (1756–1814), Fedor Sokolov (1752–1824), and Alexei Bakarev (1762–1817).

== Chronological list of notable buildings in Moscow ==
- 1773 – Golitsyn House, Tverskaya Street, destroyed 1812
- 1773 – Prozorovsky House, Bolshaya Polyanka Street, destroyed 1935 (disputed, also attributed to Bazhenov)
- 1776 – Golitsyn House, Bolshaya Lubyanka Street, destroyed 1928
- 1777 – Church of Metropolitan Philip, Gilyarovskogo Street
- 1780 – Gagarin House, Armyansky Lane
- 1780 – Prozorovsky House, Tverskaya Street, destroyed 1930s
- 1782 – Rumyantsev House, Maroseika Street (disputed, also attributed to Bazhenov) Today, houses the embassy of Belarus
- 1775-1782 – Petrovsky Palace (or Castle)
- 1785 – Kalinin and Petrov House, Ilyinka Street
- 1785 – Khryaschev House, Ilyinka Street, destroyed 1930s
- 1785 – Kiryakov House, Petrovka Street (disputed, attributed to Kazakov's junior architects)
- 1779-1788 – Senate of Moscow Kremlin
- 1788 – Church of the Resurrection, Gorokhovo Pole
- 1784-1790s – Assembly of the Nobility, now House of Unions, Okhotny Ryad Street
- 1790s – Moscow University, Mokhovaya Street. Destroyed by fire, 1812, rebuilt 1819 by Domenico Giliardi
- 1790s – Khlebnikov House, Novaya Basmannaya Street
- 1790s – Baryshnikov House, Myasnitskaya Street
- 1790s – own house and school, Moscow, Zlatoustinsky lane
- 1791 – Demidov House, Gorokhovsky lane
- 1791 – Yermolov House, Tverskaya Street, demolished 1936
- 1792 – Kozitskaya House, Petrovka Street, rebuilt in 1901 as Yeliseyev's Food Shop
- 1792 – Gubin House, Tverskaya Street
- 1786-1796 – Tsaritsyno Palace and Park (original project by Bazhenov, redesign and completion by Kazakov)
- 1797 – Musin-Pushkin House, Tverskaya Street, destroyed 1886
- 1796-1801 – Golitsyn (First City) Hospital, Kaluzhskaya Street
- 1801 – Church of St. John the Baptist, destroyed
- 1791-1803 – Church of St. Cosma and Damian, Maroseika Street
- 1802-1811 – Pavlovskaya (St. Paul's) Hospital, Pavlovskaya Street

== Sources ==
- Vostrishev, M. I.; Shokarev, S. U. (2011). Вся Москва от А до Я [Encyclopaedia "Moscow from A to Z"]. Moscow. p. 652. ISBN 978-5-4320-0001-9.
