= Vozdvizhenka Street =

Street in Moscow, Russia

Coordinates: 55°45′10″N 37°36′20″E

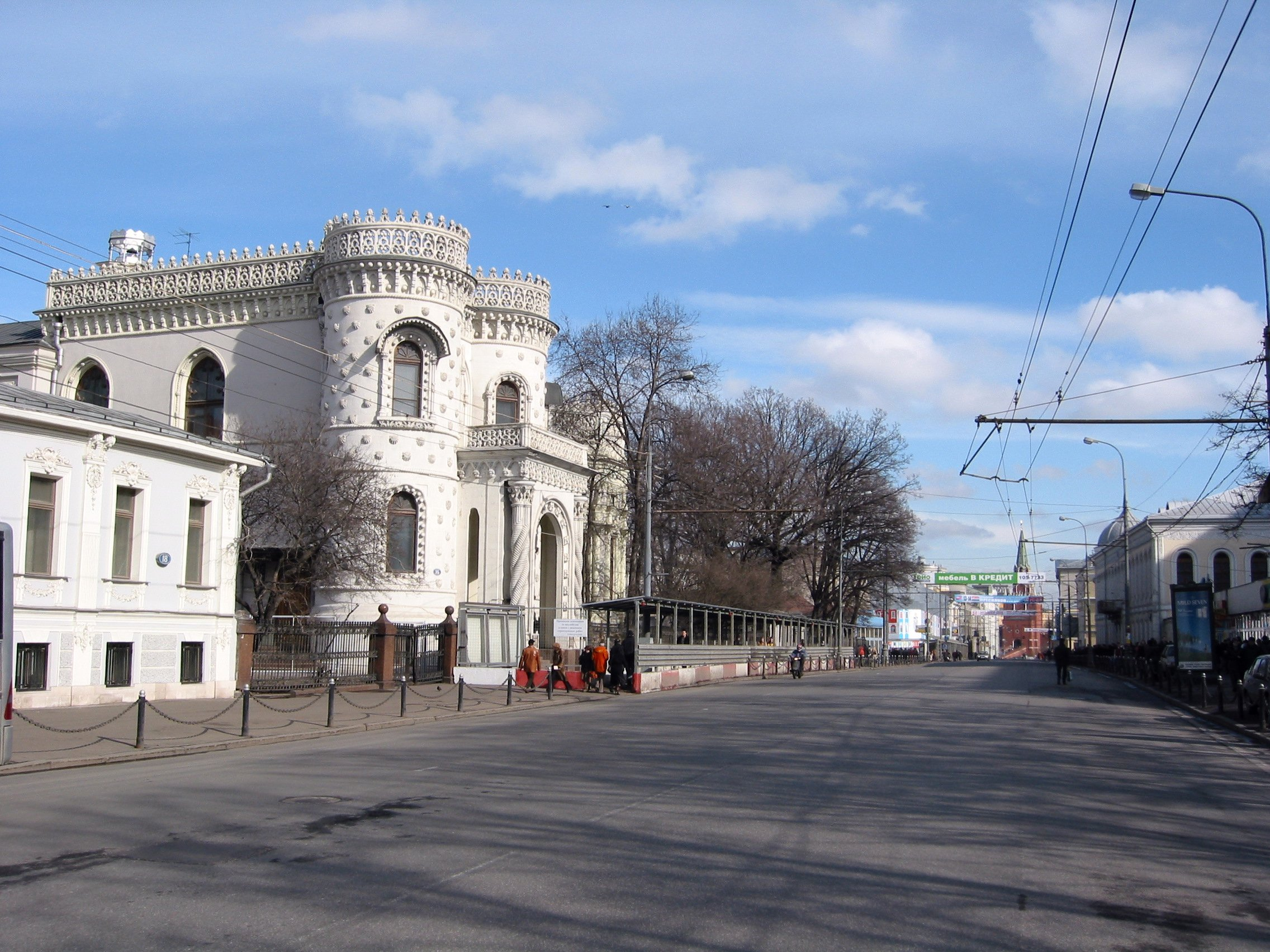
- Interactive map of Vozdvizhenka Street
- Native name: Воздвиженка (Russian)
- Location: Moscow; Central Administrative Okrug; Arbat District
- Postal code: 119019, 125009
- Nearest metro station: Arbatskaya; Arbatskaya; Biblioteka Imeni Lenina; Aleksandrovsky Sad

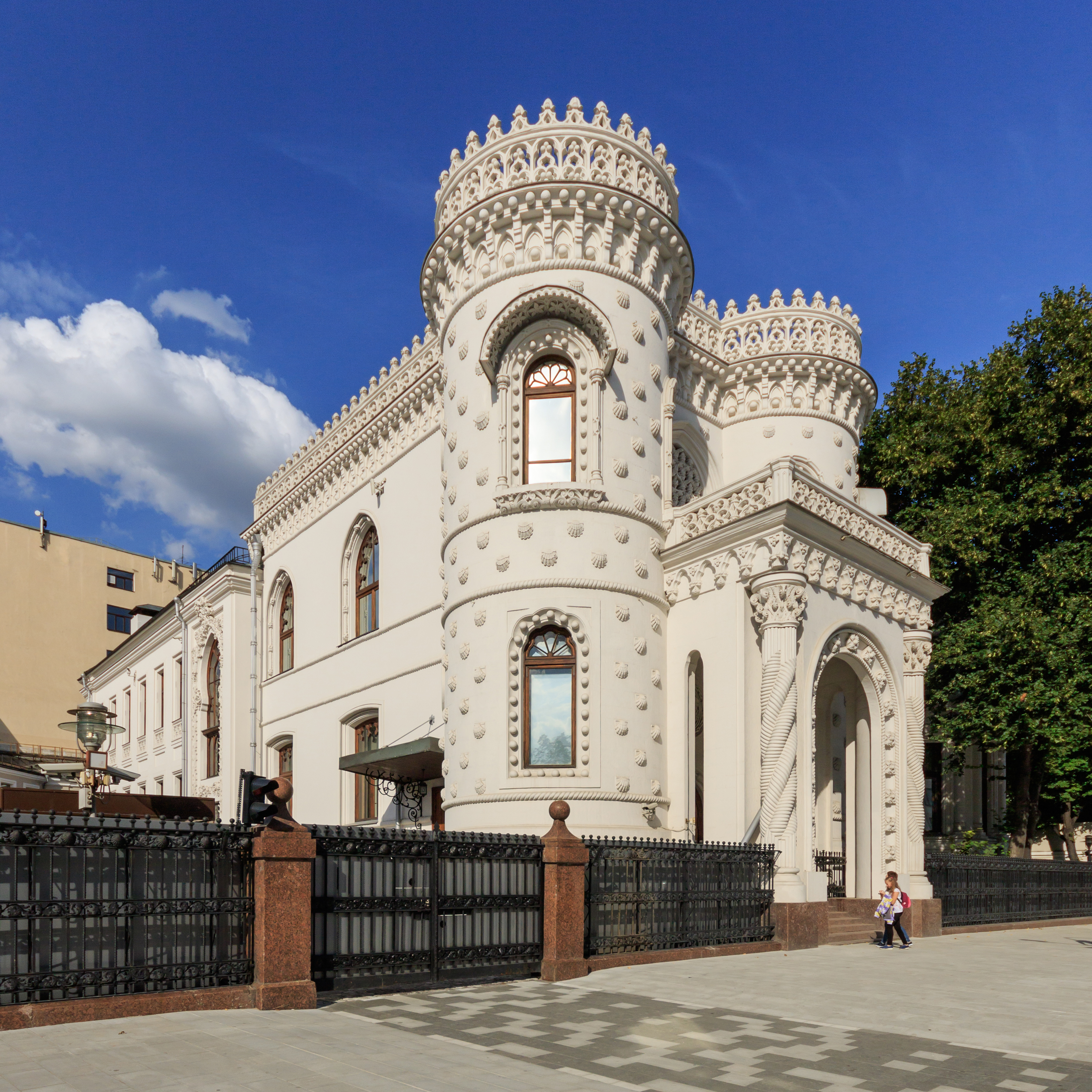
Arseny Morozov House on Vozdvizhenka

Vozdvizhenka Street, (Russian: Воздвиженка), is a radial street connecting Manege Square and Arbat Square in central Arbat District of Moscow, Russia. The street's name refers to a monastery that existed here since 1450 and perished in the Fire of Moscow (1812). In 1934–1946, it was known as Comintern Street (улица Коминтерна), in 1946–1991 as Kalinin Street (улица Калинина) Kalinin Prospect (проспект Калинина).

== Overview ==
Vozdvizhenka stretches due west from Kutafya Tower of Moscow Kremlin, past Mokhovaya Street, to Arbat Square on the Boulevard Ring. Present-day Vozdvizhenka incorporates a former square between Moscow Manege, Kutafya Tower and Mokhovaya Street that used to be a separate entity, called Sapozhkovskaya Square or Manege Square (different from present-day Manege Square).

Vozdvizhenka is the first stretch of an old route to Smolensk, continued west by New Arbat Avenue and Kutuzovsky Prospekt. Prior to development of New Arbat in 1960s, this route passed via old Arbat Street and Borodinsky Bridge. Vozdvizhenka today is a one-way, westbound street; opposite traffic from New Arbat is diverted through Znamenka Street.

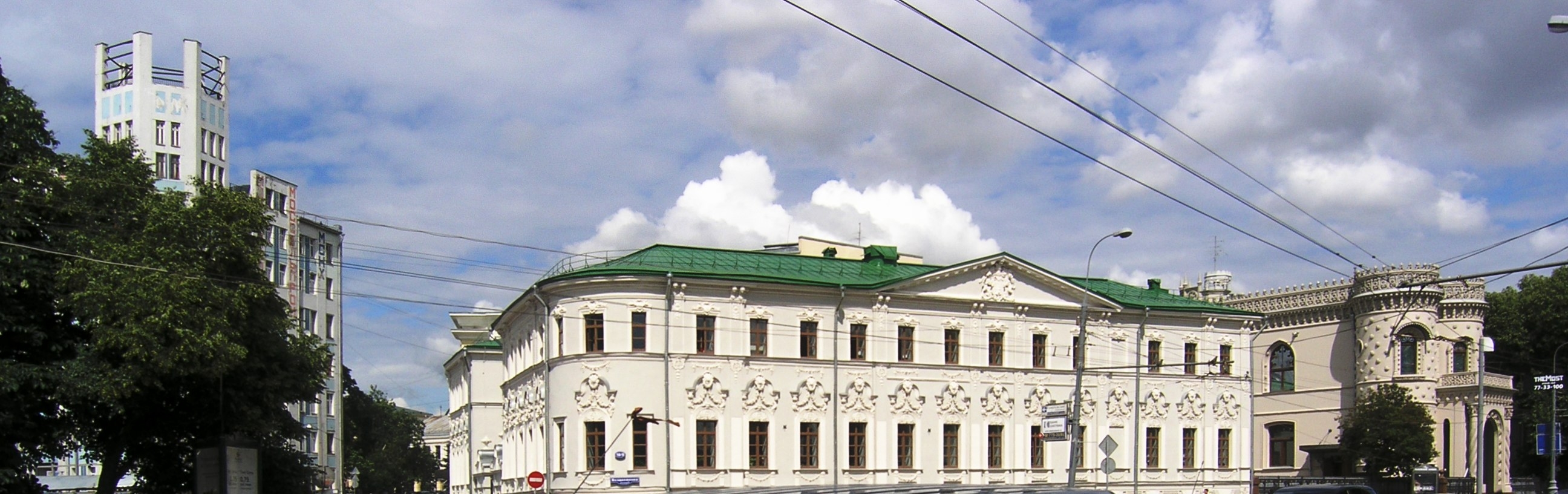
Mosselprom, Schakovskoy, Morozov

Notable buildings and institutions include:

- 3 - Russian State Library (1928–1941)
- 4 - Site of Ivan Grozny's palace
- 5 - State Museum of Architecture in former Talyzin House built by Matvey Kazakov (1787)
- 9 - Volkonsky House (Prince Bolkonsky House) - Leo Tolstoy's address destroyed due to the reconstruction in 2013.
- 11 - Ministry of Defense (1990s)
- 10 - The former Voyentorg department store (1910s, dismantled under mayor Luzhkov, rebuilt in an altered form in 2007)
- 14 - Varvara Morozova estate by Roman Klein (1887)
- 16 - Arseny Morozov House, modelled after Monserrate Palace in Sintra, Portugal by Victor Mazyrin (1899), now Europe house. Formerly housed the Proletcult Theatre, later becoming the "House of Friendship with Foreign Countries."
- 18 - Schakhovskoy House (1783, 1820s)
- Kalashny Lane, 2/10 (near 18, Vozdvizhenka) - Mosselprom Building (1923)
