= Sivtsev Vrazhek Lane =

Street in Moscow, Russia

Coordinates: 55°44′51″N 37°35′38″E

Sivtsev Vrazhek
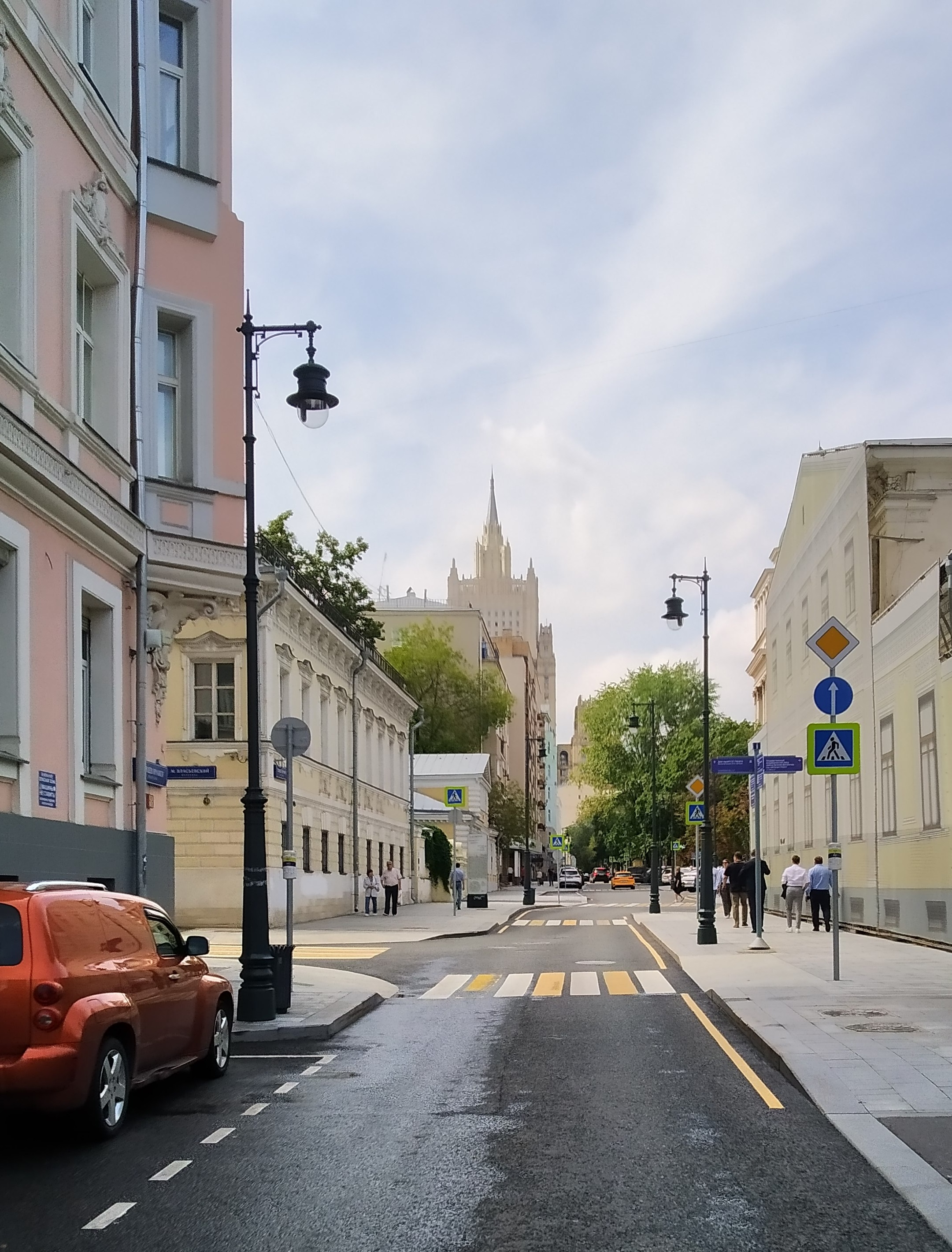
- Sivtsev Vrazhek Lane
- Interactive map of Sivtsev Vrazhek
- Native name: Сивцев Вражек (Russian)
- Location: Moscow, Russia

Sivtsev Vrazhek is a radial lane in the Central Administrative Okrug of Moscow; it forms the boundary between Arbat and Khamovniki municipal districts. The lane begins at a T-junction with Gogolevsky Boulevard and runs west, roughly parallel to Arbat Street (north) and Prechistenka Street (south), ending at a T-junction with Denezhny Lane, one block short of the Garden Ring. The name of the lane, literally Sivka stream gully, refers to a historical stream now locked in an underground sewer and is only one of two Vrazheks in present-day Moscow (the other being Kozhevnichesky Vrazhek west of Novospassky Bridge).

== History ==
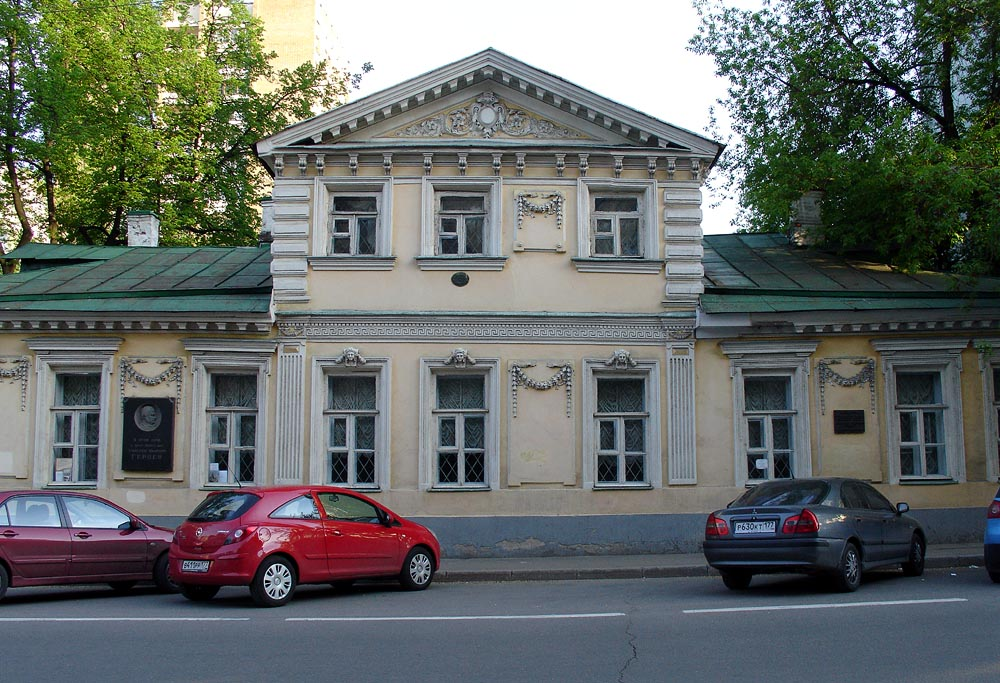
No. 27, once owned by Alexander Herzen's father

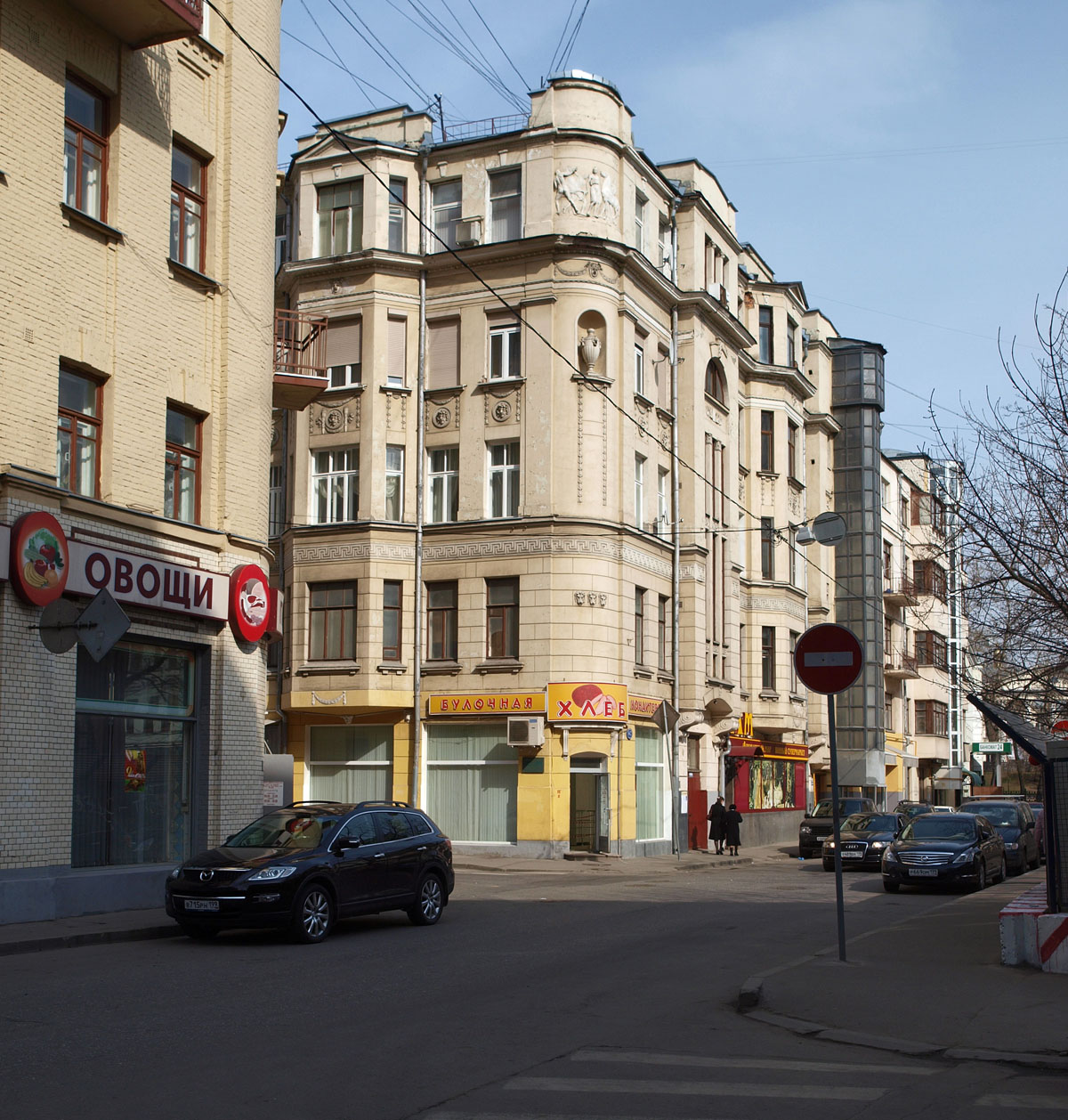
Nos. 8 and 6, early 20th century luxury apartments

Sivka Stream ran eastward along the present-day lane into Chertoryi Stream that flowed southward on site of present-day Gogolevsky Boulevard into Moskva River. In the 18th century Sivka was locked into an open stone-clad ditch, opening up space for a proper lane, and in the first quarter of the 19th century the ditch was rebuilt into an underground sewer.

In the 15th and 16th centuries Sivtsev Vrazhek was part of a road connecting Moscow with Smolensk. The area prospered since taking of Smolensk by Vasily III, but, in the end of the 16th century, construction of Bely Gorod fortress walls separated the street from the center of Moscow; the Smolensk highway changed its track in favor of Arbat Street, and Sivtsev Vrazhek became a quiet residential street. During the 17th century the area was fragmented into four slobodas of different trades employed by the Court: from east to west, these were icon painters, horse grooms, carpenters and mint workers. All of these trades are retained in the names of north–south lanes crossing Sivtsev Vrazhek. The crisis of Moscow economy caused by Peter I depopulated these slobodas, and in the first half of the 18th century their lands were taken over by aristocracy. The area was dominated by wooden estate houses placed on spacious garden lots, with very few stone buildings.

By the end of the 18th century the area was home to Moscow's oldest, but not necessarily the wealthiest, noble families. All of the building of this period perished in the Fire of 1812; after the fire, it was repopulated by the same upper-class families. Notable 19th-century residents included Peter Kropotkin, Alexander Herzen, count Fyodor Tolstoy "The American", Sergey Aksakov; general Yermolov owned the building on the corner of Boulevard Ring but himself lived on Prechistenka Street. In 1863 Leo Tolstoy wrote in his diary that he dreamed of his own place in Sivtsev Vrazhek where he could spend the winter months in country style.

In the end of the 19th century the old aristocratic mansions on the north side of the lane were gradually replaced by mid-rise, upper- and middle-class apartment buildings; the process was interrupted by World War I and the Russian Civil War. The only building added in the interbellum period was a 1932 experimental apartment block designed by Dmitry Lebedev and Nikolai Ladovsky, notable for its combination of segments linked at 120° angle. More contemporary buildings were added in the 1950s and 1980s (most of them on the north side). The lane has been converted to one-way (westbound) traffic in the 1990s.

== In fiction ==
The lane, being part of the upper-class west side of Moscow, is featured in Russian-language fiction with notable occurrences in:

- Sivtsev Vrazhek, a 1929 novel by Mikhail Osorgin (1878-1942) published in English in 1930 as A Quiet Street, itself referenced in fiction by Daniil Granin and Alexander Galich
- Doctor Zhivago by Boris Pasternak
- The Two Captains by Veniamin Kaverin (Chapter 10)
- "War and Peace" by Leo Tolstoy (Book VIII, Chapter 1 and First Epilogue, Chapter 5)
- "Black snow" by M.A. Boelgakov(Chapter XII)
