= Nikitsky Boulevard =

Thoroughfare in central Moscow, Russia

Coordinates: 55°45′22″N 37°35′57″E

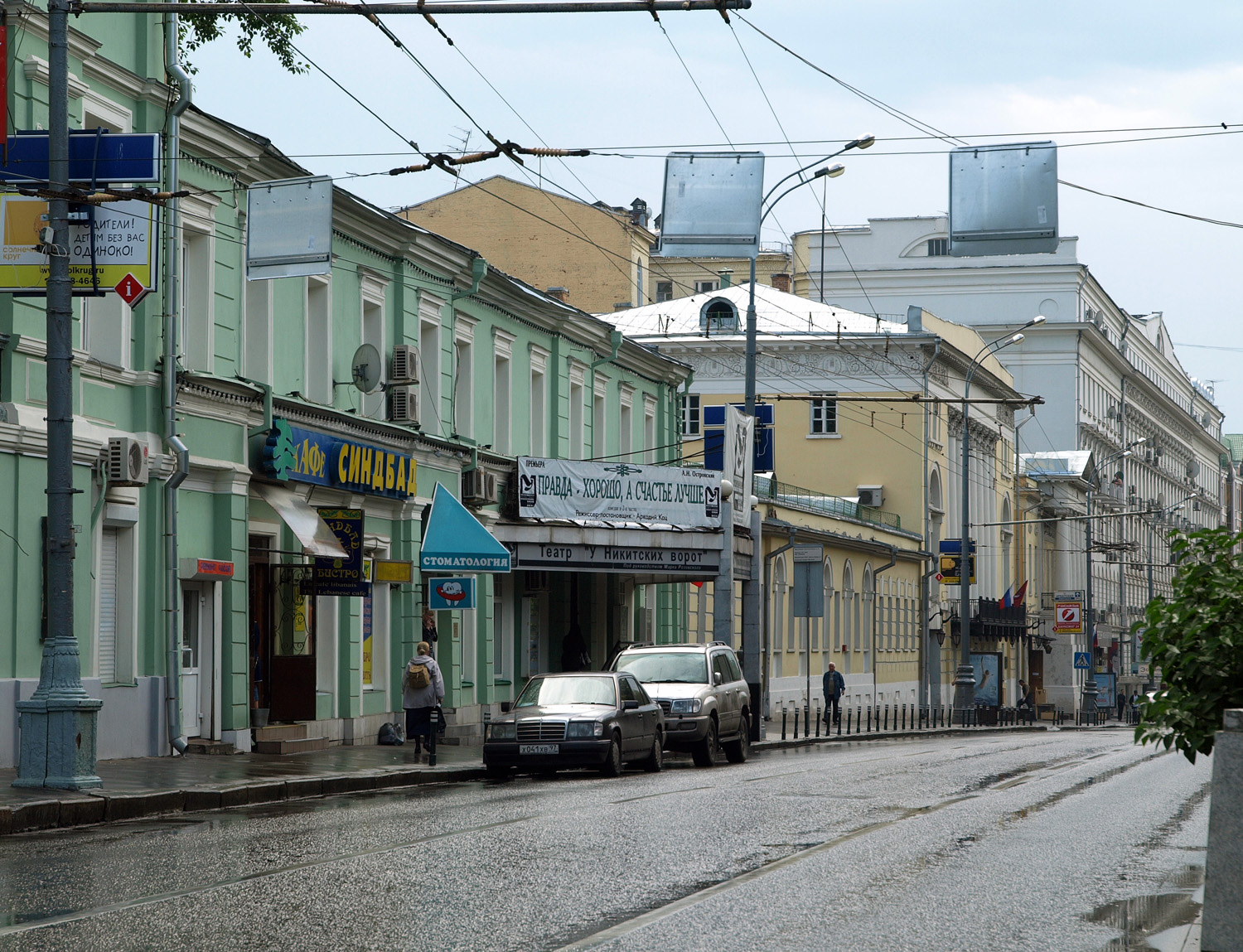
Nikitsky Boulevard in 2008

Nikitsky Boulevard (Russian: Никитский бульвар) is a boulevard in central Moscow, Russia. The boulevard is a part of the Boulevard Ring, connecting Arbat Square with Nikitskie Vorota square at the crossing with the Nikitsky Street. The actual green boulevard extends for only two thirds of the street; its southern part was razed in the 1960s to make way for a tunnel under the Arbat Square. In 1950 the street was renamed Suvorovskiy Boulevard, Russian: Суворовский Бульвар in honour of generalissimus Alexander Suvorov. The old street name was reinstated in 1994.

The street is home to a monument of writer Nikolai Gogol, placed deep in the courtyard of an 18th-century Talyzin mansion where the author spent his last few years 1848–1852 and where he burned the manuscript of the second volume of the Dead Souls in a fit 'sent by the devil.' This monument by sculptor Nikolay Andreyev depicted Gogol in a state of depression and originally (from 1909) stood on the northern tip of Gogolevsky Boulevard but, apparently due to Stalin's dislike of this depiction, was relocated in 1951 to its current place. A second monument to Gogol by sculptor Nikolai Tomsky (a much more socialist-realist effort, which shows no signs of Gogol's mental state) replaced the old one at the old site in 1956.
