= New Arbat Avenue =

Street in Moscow, Russia

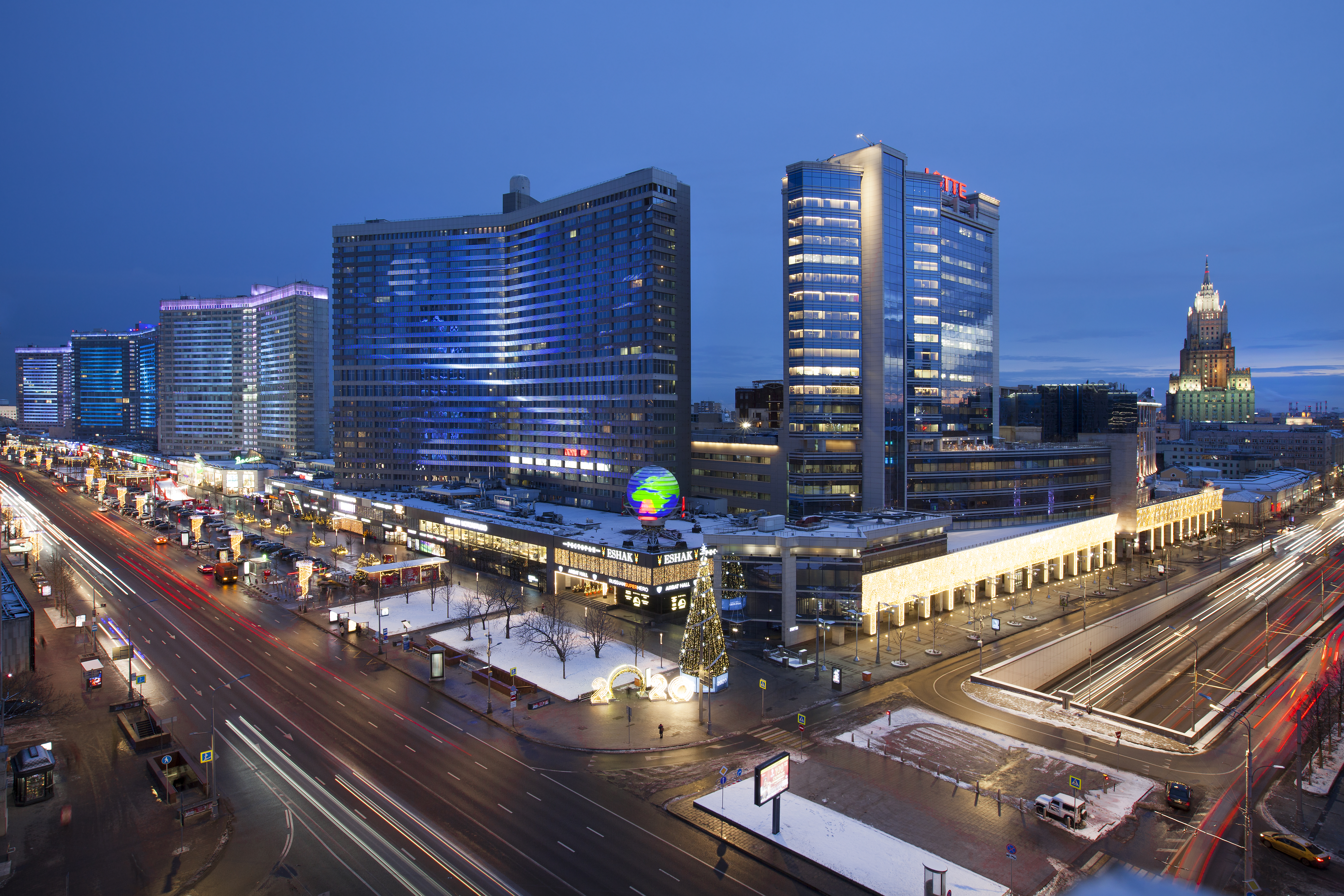
- Interactive map of New Arbat Avenue
- Native name: Новый Арбат (Russian)
- Length: 1.5 km (0.93 mi)
- Location: Arbat District, Moscow, Russia
- Postal code: 119019, 121069, 121099, 121205, 127025
- Nearest metro station: Arbatskaya; Smolenskaya; Arbatskaya; Smolenskaya
- Coordinates: 55°45′04″N 37°35′28″E

New Arbat Avenue (Russian: Новый Арбат) is a major street in Moscow running west from Arbatskaya Square on the Boulevard Ring to Novoarbatsky Bridge on the opposite bank of the Moskva (river). The modern eight-lane avenue (originally named Kalinin Prospekt in 1968–1994), along with two rows of high-rise buildings, was constructed between 1962 and 1968, and was literally cut through the old, narrow streets of the Arbat District.

== Within the Garden Ring ==
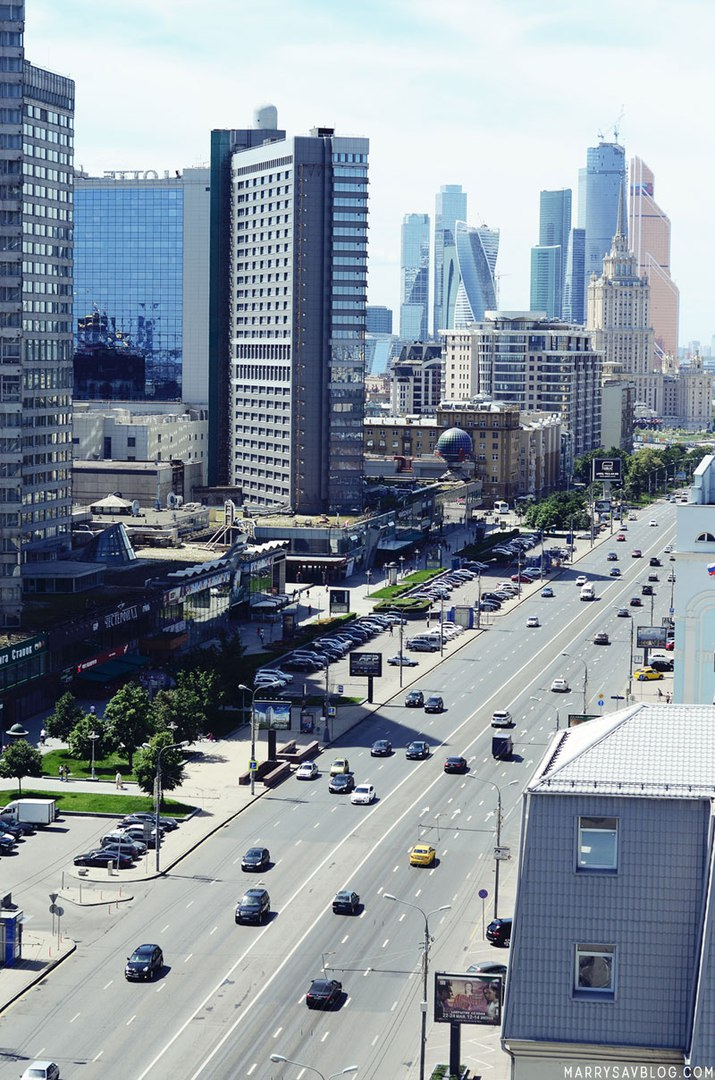
New Arbat Avenue from a higher perspective

A modern avenue running parallel to the picturesque Arbat Street was first envisioned in Joseph Stalin's 1935 Master Plan, however the project was delayed by the outbreak of the Second World War, and work did not begin until the late 1950s. The first stage of the project, the Novoarbatsky Bridge, was completed in 1957. Between 1957 and 1963, the city redeveloped land on the opposite (western) bank of the Moskva, creating the beginning of Kutuzovsky Prospekt, and completing the main part of New Arbat by 1968.

The southern side of the avenue (excluding the historical buildings of the Praga Restaurant and the Grauerman Nursery near Arbat Square) is dominated by a series of V-shaped, 26-storey office buildings constructed atop a long two-storey structure housing restaurants, retail establishments and two underground levels for storage and delivery. Despite the government's public statements against gambling, more than half of this space was for a long time occupied by casinos. On July 4, 2009, a new government ban restricted gambling to four permitted zones, effectively putting an end to the industry in Moscow; the Novy Arbat casinos have subsequently either closed or morphed into entertainment centers and restaurants.

The northern side, has five narrow 26-storey apartment towers positioned perpendicularly to the avenue. The space between the towers is occupied by (west to east):

- The Oktyabr cinema, built 1965 and restructured by Atelier Achatz Architekten in 1998
- A row of "old" office buildings, actually built in 1996 using fragments of historical structures
- A row of genuine early 20th century buildings, although these have been heavily rebuilt
- The Moscow House of Books, the city's largest bookstore. The Lermontov Memorial House stands right behind it – one of the few surviving single-story wooden houses built after the 1812 Fire.

Native Muscovites sometimes refer to the office blocks as "the dentures".

== Beyond the Garden Ring ==
The short stretch beyond Novoarbatsky Bridge is lined with Stalinist apartment buildings; a five-story postconstructivist block on the south side was recently torn down and replaced with luxury apartment buildings.

- The tallest building, the 31-storey Comecon tower, was completed in 1965–1970
- The grounds of the US Embassy are located just north from Comecon tower
- The White House, the seat of Russia's government, stands on the embankment west of the US Embassy
- The new embassy of UK stands on the embankment south of the avenue

== Popular culture ==
- A scene in the 1986 sci-fi film Kin-Dza-Dza! was filmed on the Avenue, at No. 26.

== Gallery ==
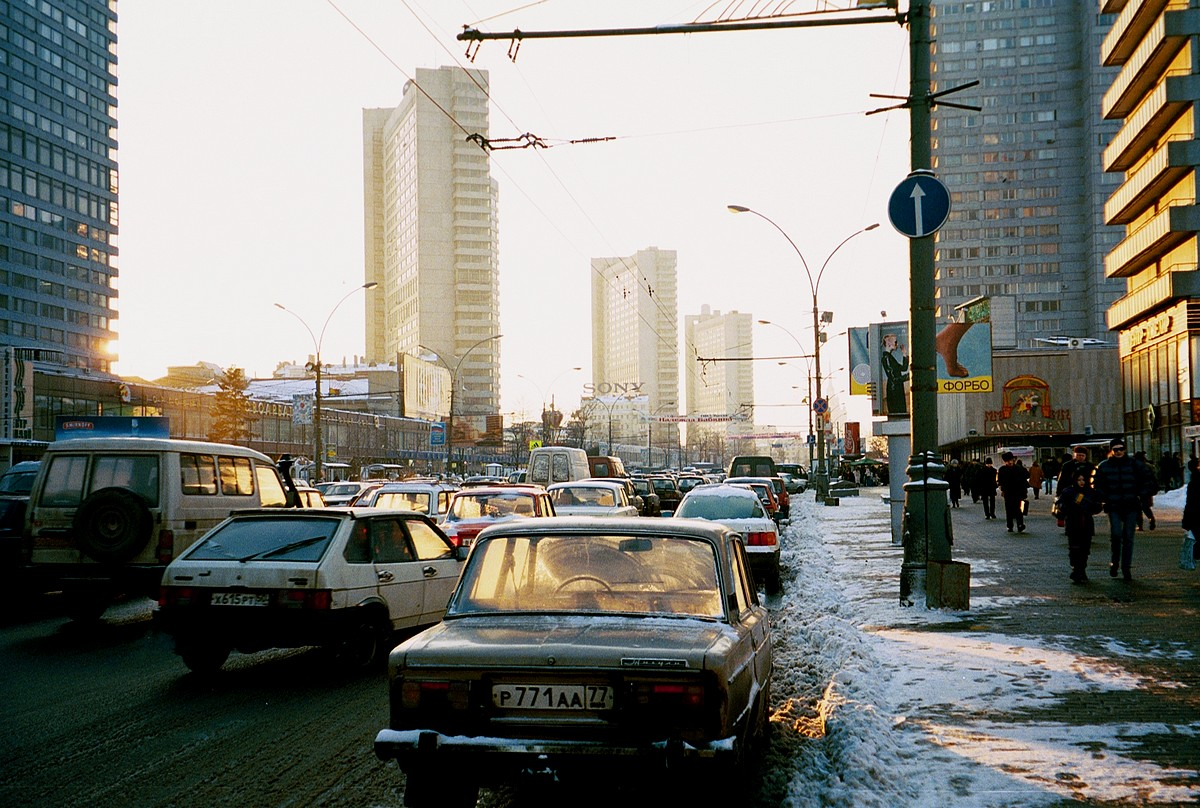
New Arbat Avenue in 1999

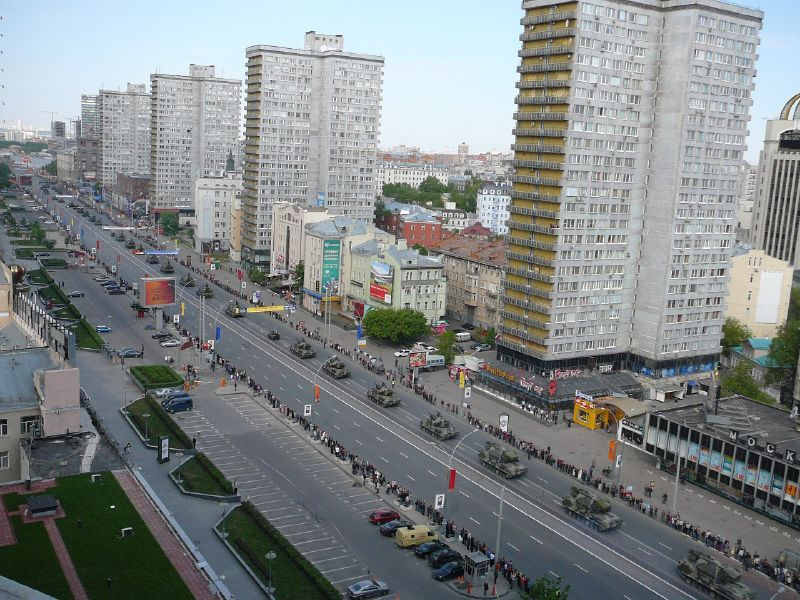
May 9 parade in 2008

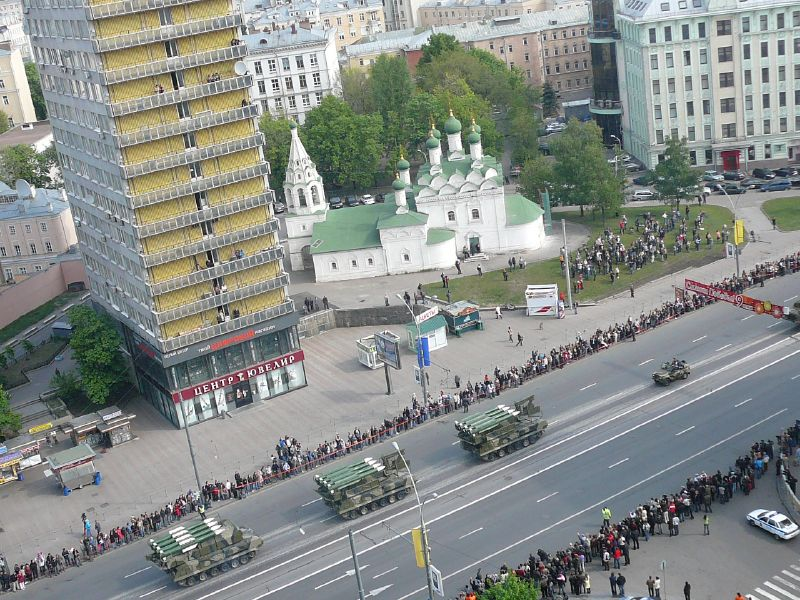
Church of Simeon Stylites

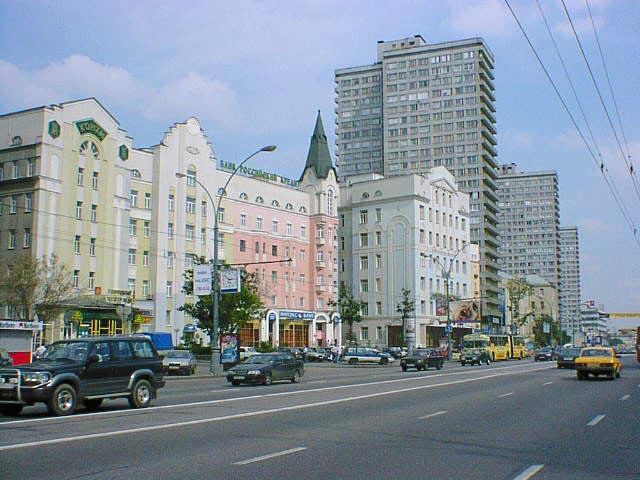
The varied architecture on the Northern side of New Arbat Avenue

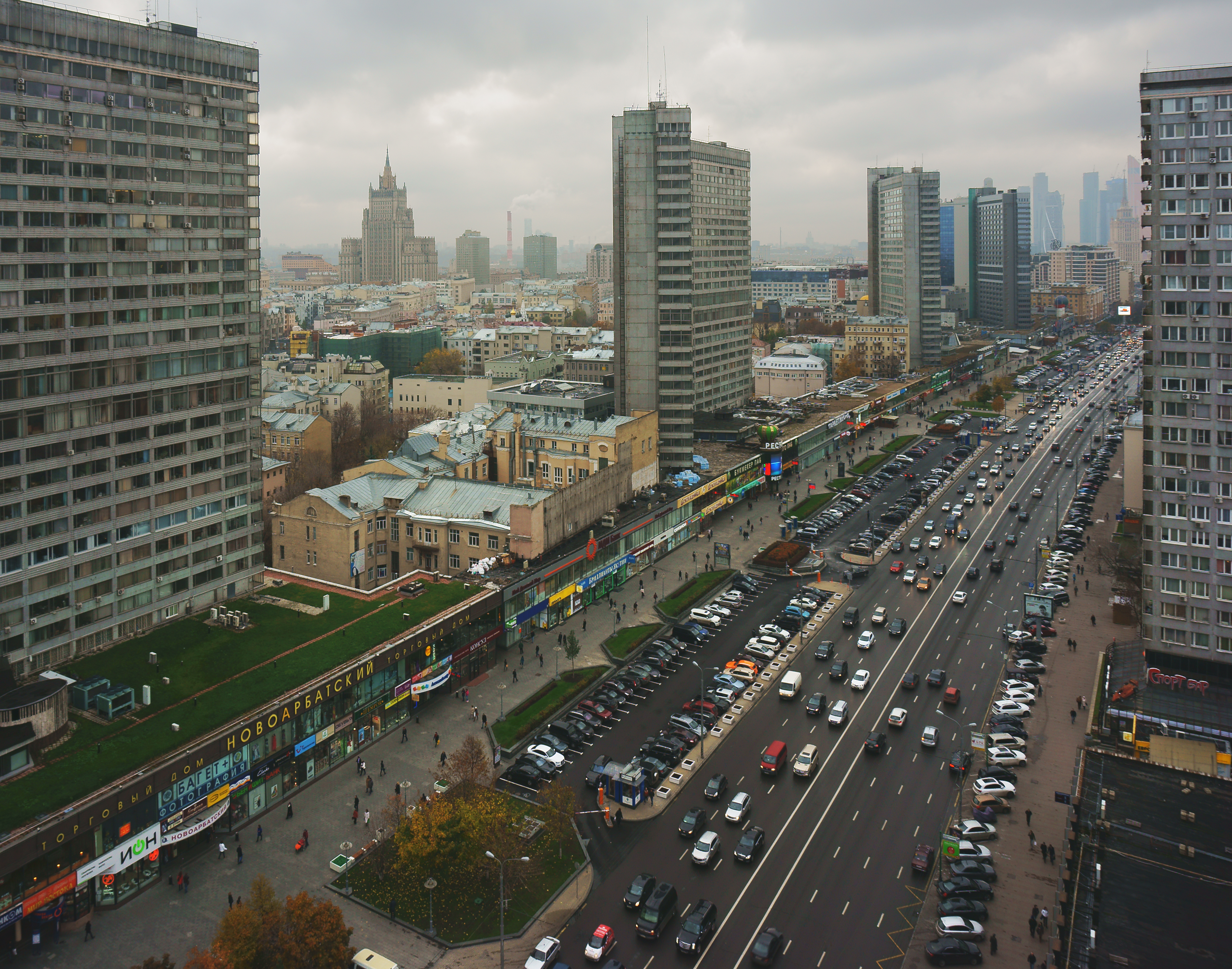
New Arbat Avenue in 2013

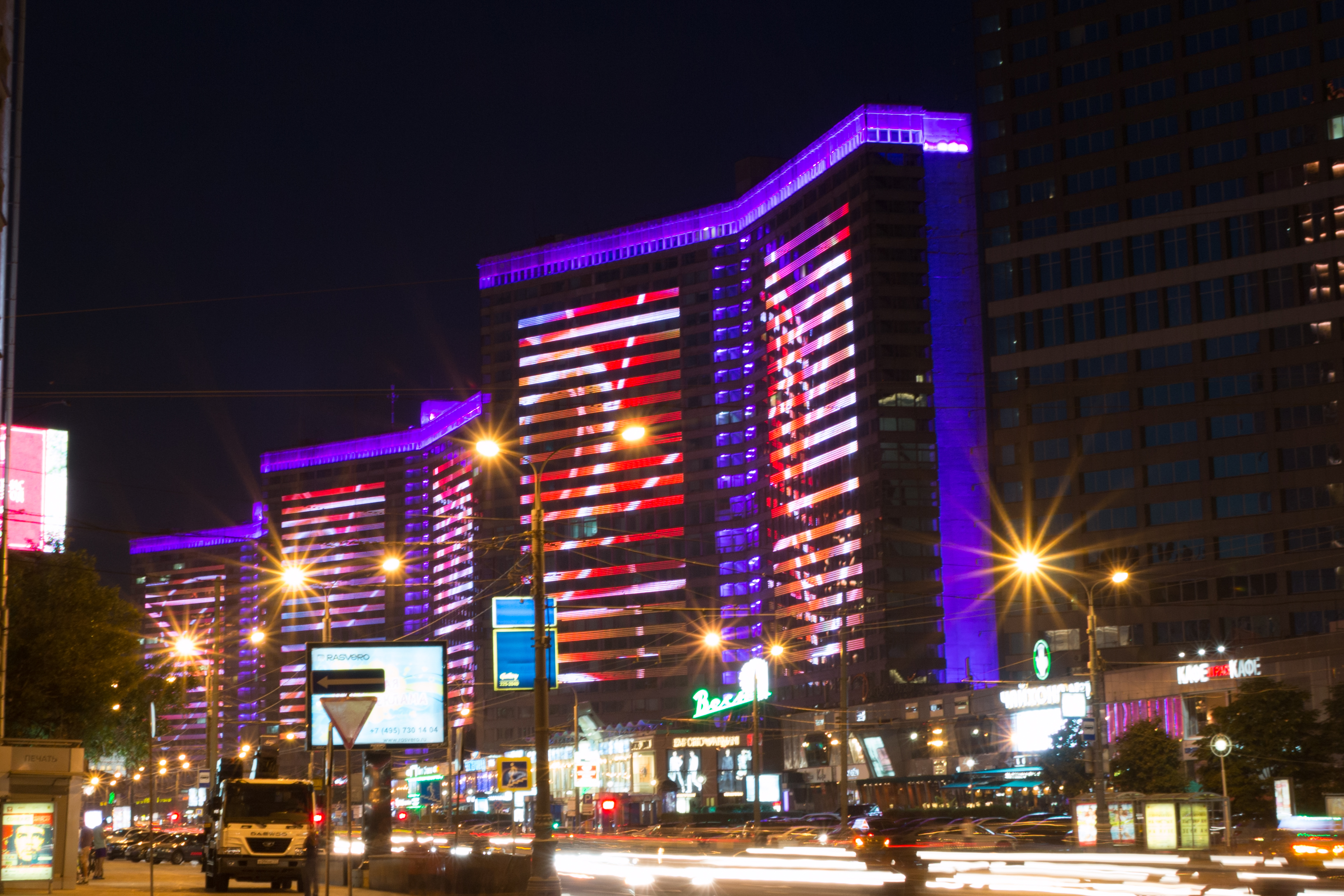
New Arbat Avenue in the evening, 2014

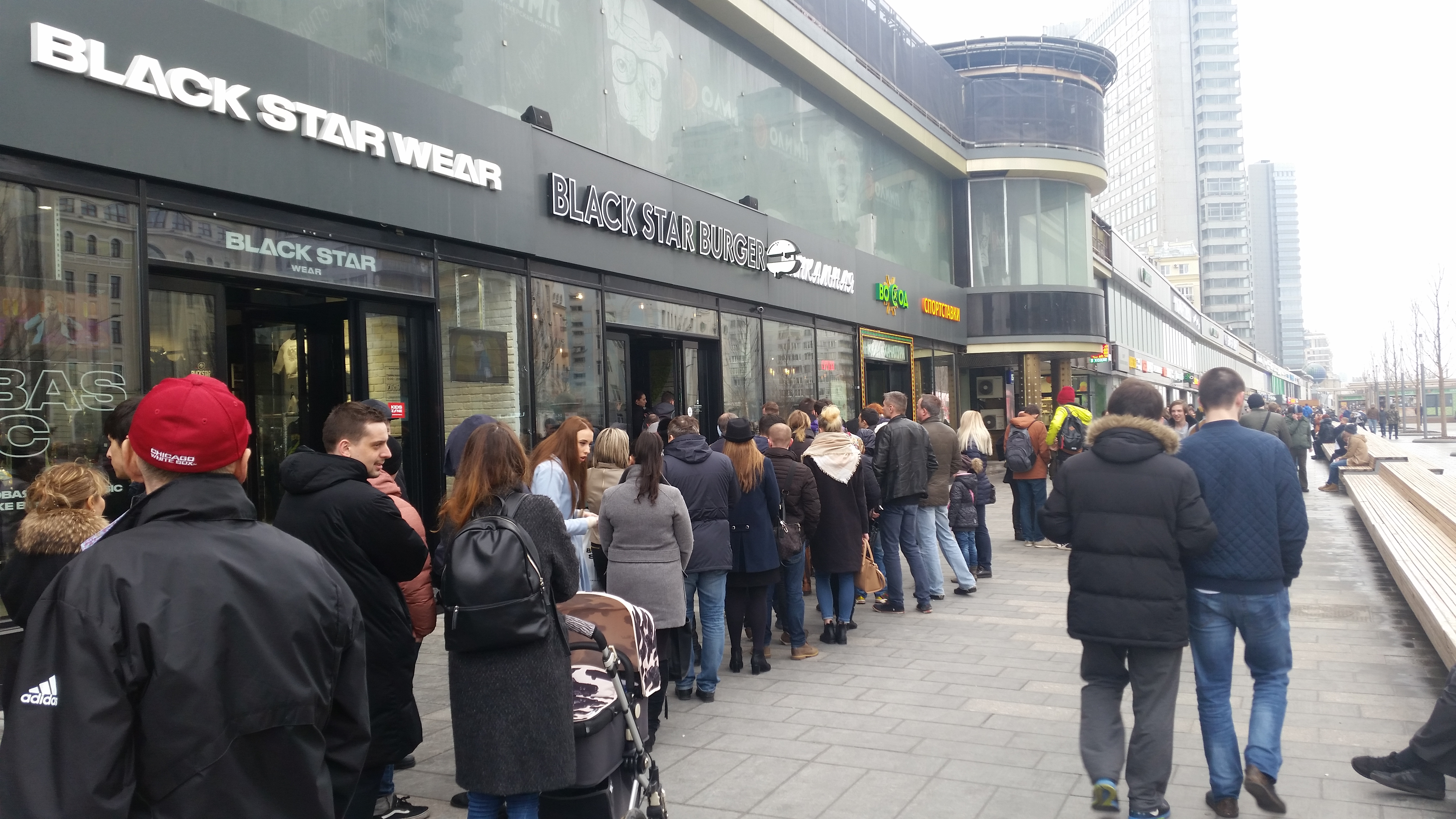
The queue to the Black Star Burger restaurant, 2017
