= Gogolevsky Boulevard =

Street in Arbat District, Russia

Coordinates: 55°44′56″N 37°36′0″E

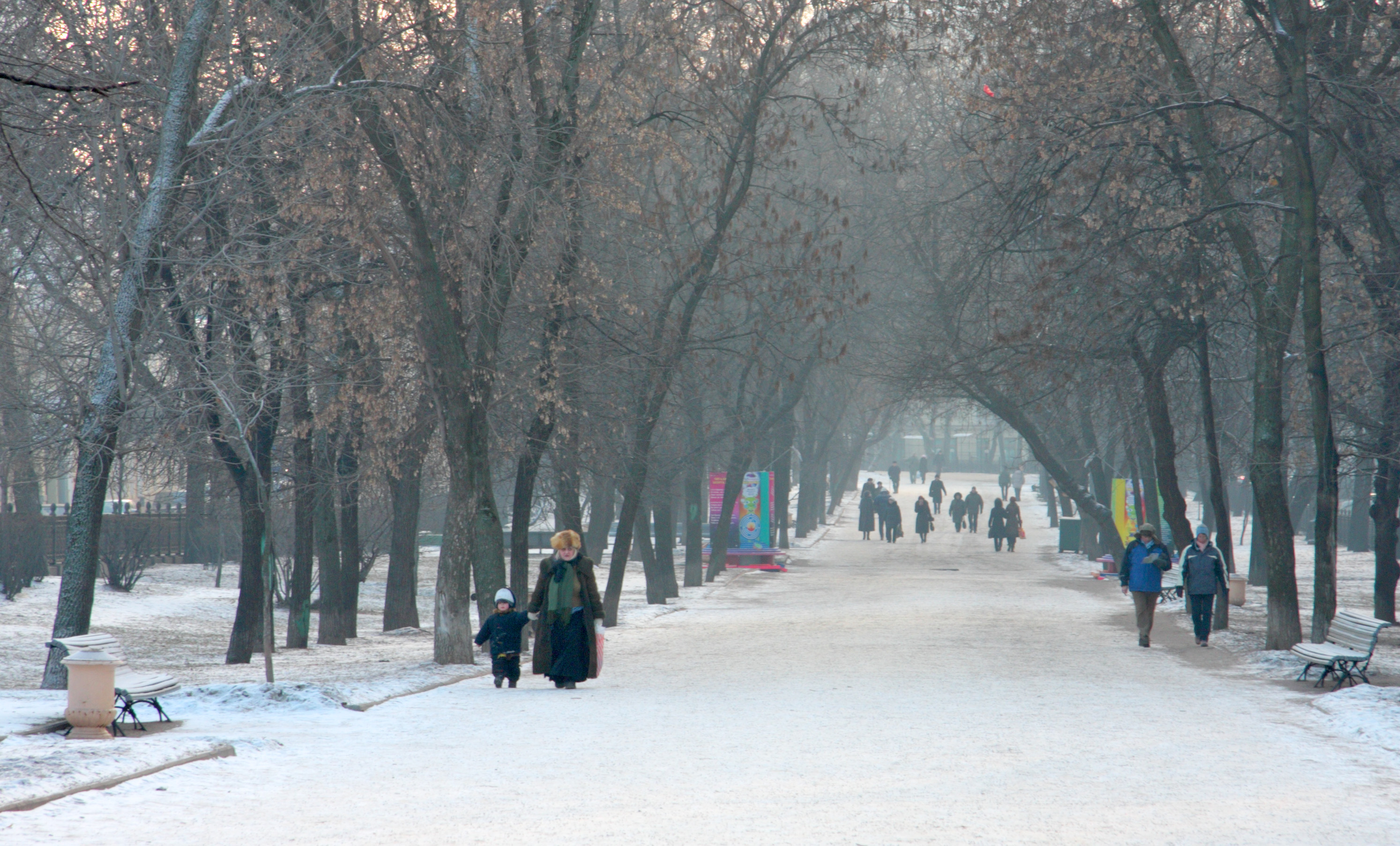

Gogolevsky Boulevard (Russian: Гоголевский бульвар) is a boulevard near the Arbat District, Moscow, Russia, named after the writer Nikolai Gogol. It was named Prechistensky Boulevard (Russian: Пречи́стенский бульвар) until 1924, after the nearby street Prechistenka.

The boulevard begins next to the Cathedral of Christ the Saviour, and is the beginning of the Boulevard Ring. The boulevard runs north-east and ends at the Arbat Square, from where it continues as Nikitsky Boulevard.

Gogolevsky Boulevard is home to the world-famous Central Chess Club.

== Gallery ==
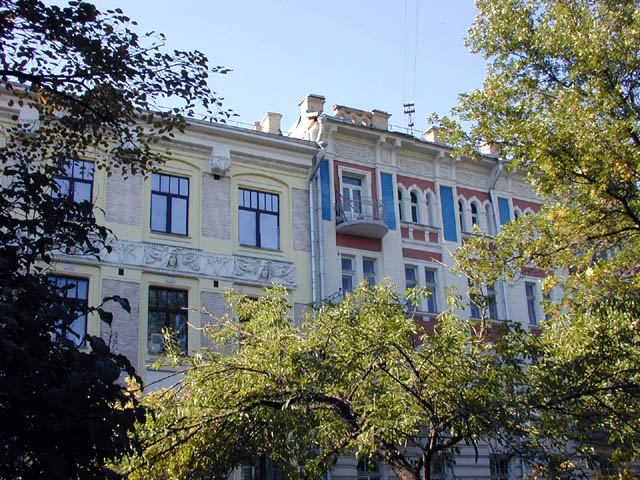
The rich architecture of Gogolevsky Boulevard

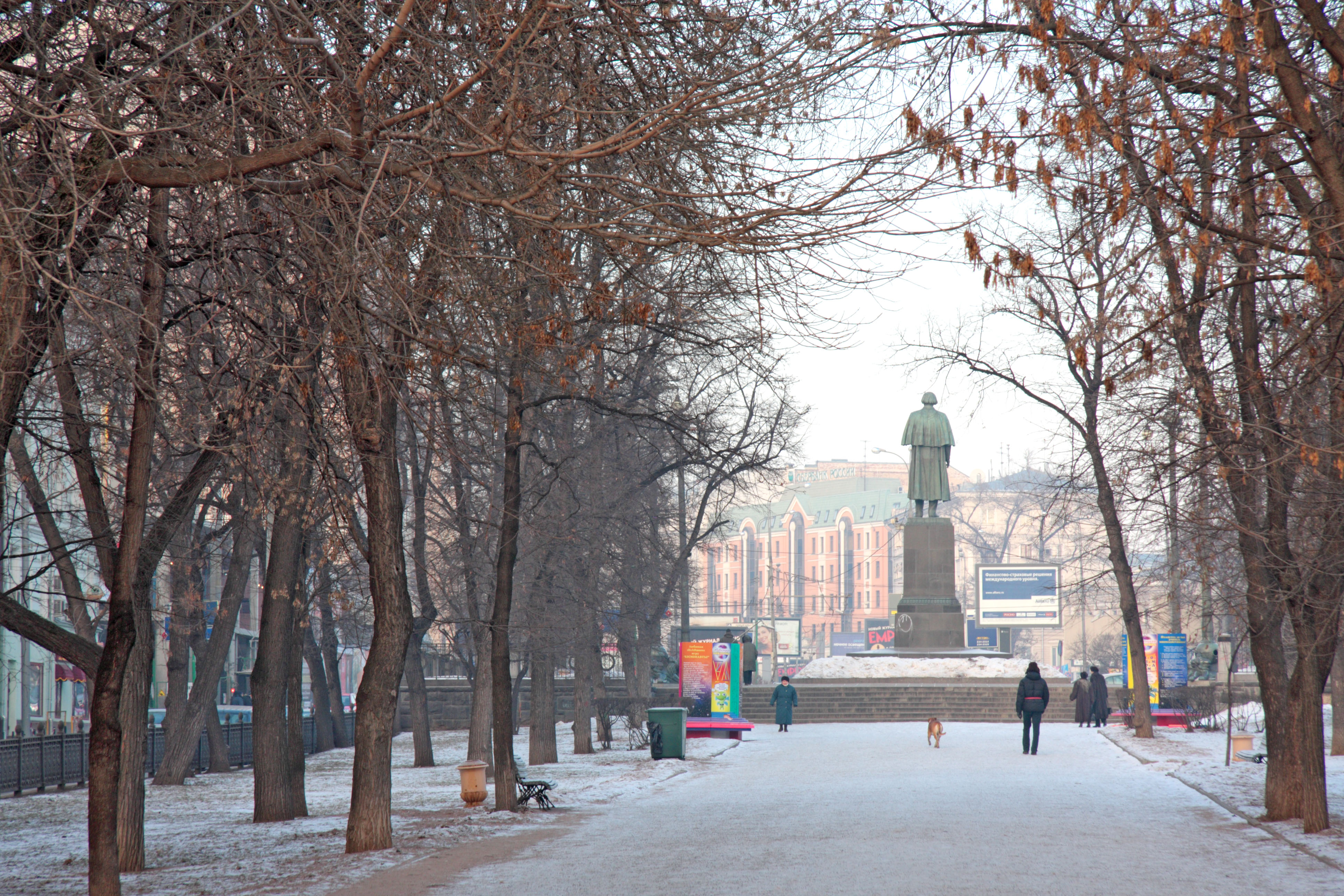
Monument of Nikolai Gogol at Arbat Gates Square
