= Arbat Street =

Pedestrian street in Moscow, Russia

The Arbat
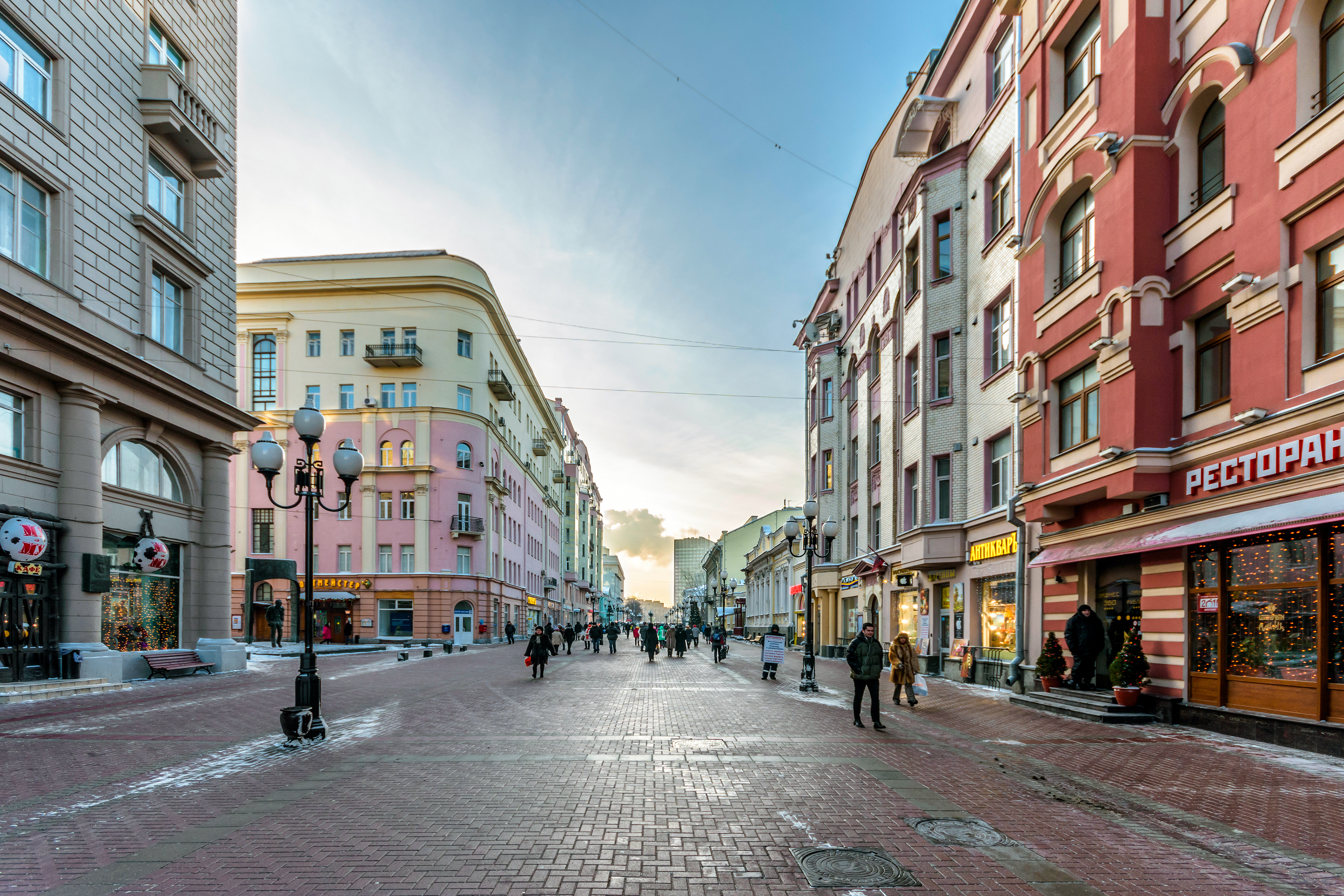
- The Arbat in January 2016
- Interactive map of The Arbat
- Native name: Арбат (Russian)
- Former name(s): Orbat (1493); Smolenskaya Street (middle of the 17th century.)
- Location: Moscow; Central Administrative Okrug; Arbat District
- Postal code: 119019, 119002
- Nearest metro station: Arbatskaya; Arbatskaya; Smolenskaya; Smolenskaya
- Coordinates: 55°45′4″N 37°35′46″E

Arbat Street (Russian: Арба́т, IPA: [ɐrˈbat]), mainly referred to in English as the Arbat, is a pedestrian street about one kilometer long in the historical centre of Moscow, Russia. The Arbat has existed since at least the 15th century, which makes it one of the oldest surviving streets of the Russian capital. It forms the heart of the Arbat District of Moscow. Originally the street formed part of an important trade-route and was home to many craftsmen.

In the 18th century, the Russian nobility came to regard the Arbat as the most prestigious living area in Moscow. Almost completely destroyed by the great fire of 1812 associated with Napoleon's occupation of Moscow, the street required rebuilding. In the 19th and early 20th centuries it became known as a place where petty nobility, artists, and academics lived. In the Soviet period, it housed many high-ranking government officials.

As of 2016, the street and its surroundings are undergoing gentrification, and it is considered a desirable place to live. Because of the many historic buildings, and due to the numerous artists who have lived and worked in the street, the Arbat has also become an important tourist attraction.

== Location and route ==
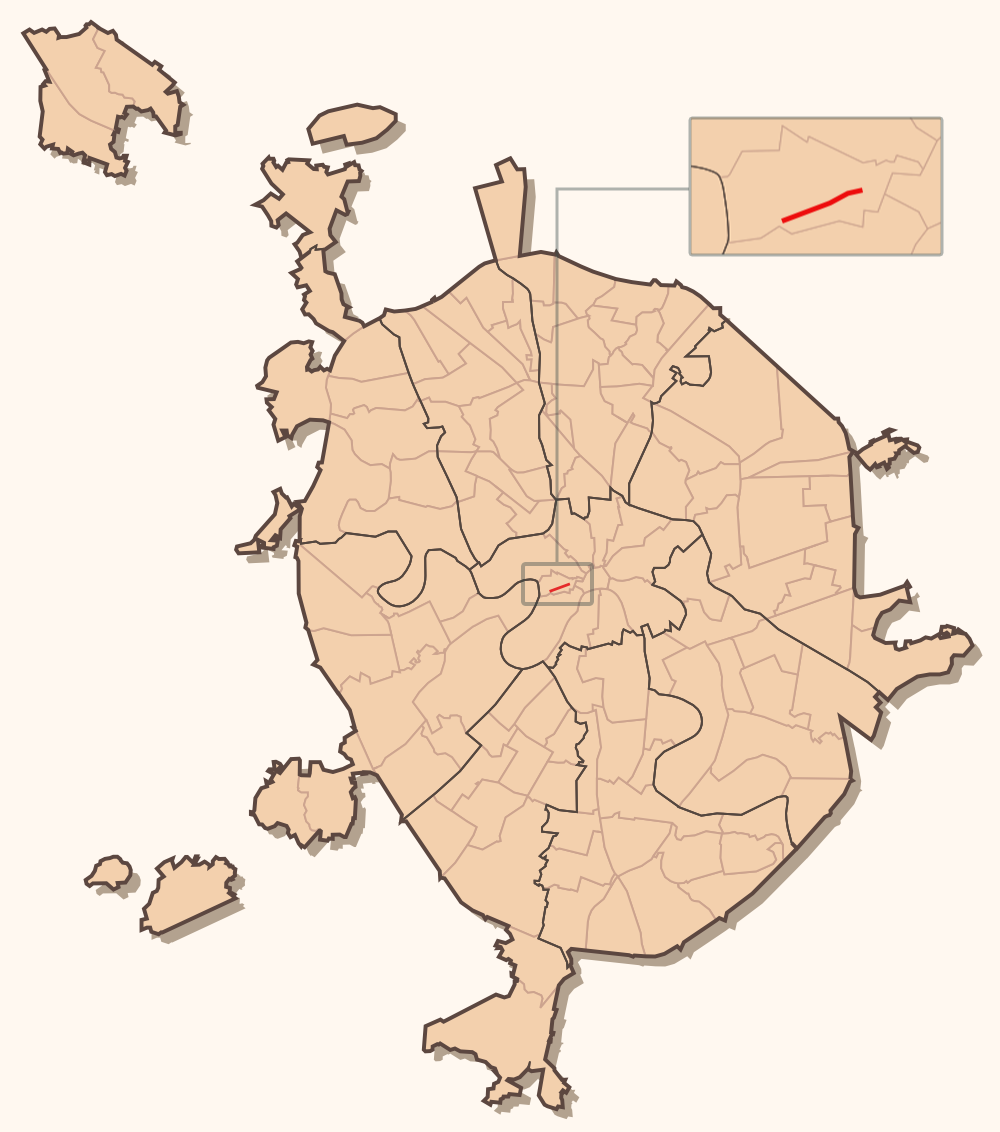
Location of the Old Arbat on a map of Moscow

The Arbat is in the historic center of Moscow. It begins at Arbatskaya square (Арбатская площадь), 800 metres west of the walls of the Moscow Kremlin. Arbatskaya square is also the meeting point of the Boulevard Ring and Vozdvizhenka Street (Улица Воздвиженка). The part of this square which is adjacent to the Arbat is called Arbat Gate (Арбатские Ворота), as it is the site of one of the ten gates of the old city wall. The wall, which was intact from the 16th to the 18th centuries, followed the path of the current Boulevard Ring. From this point the Arbat runs southwest, with a dozen side streets leading off, and ends at Smolenskaya Square (Смоленская площадь), which intersects with the Garden Ring. Continuing on from the Arbat in a westerly direction is the eight-lane Smolenskaya Street (Смоленская улица). This street changes its name several times within the city limits, ultimately crossing the MKAD ring road, and becoming the M1 highway to Smolensk, Minsk and Warsaw.

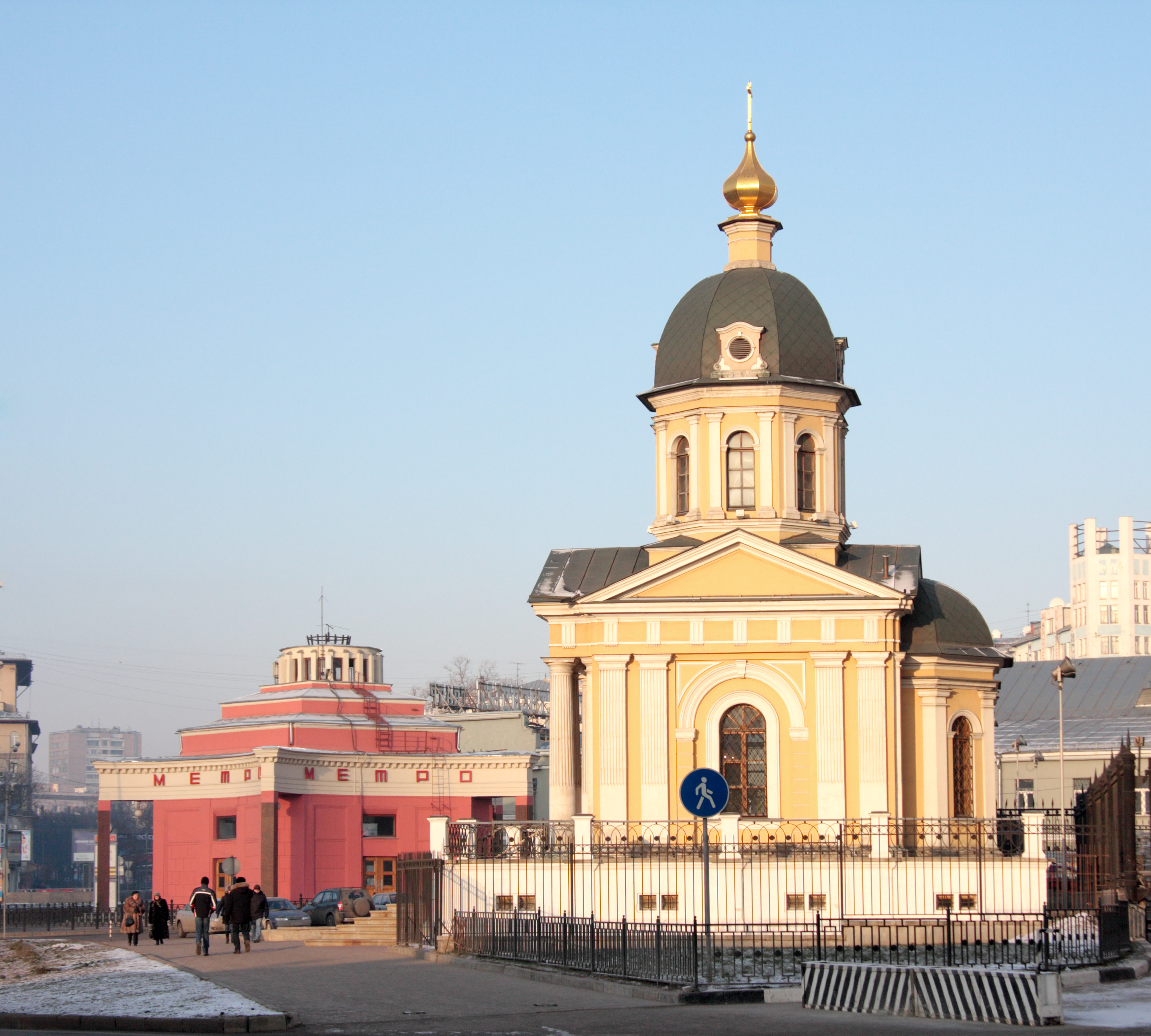
Arbat Square. Right: The chapel of Boris and Gleb, built 1997. Left: The entrance Arbatskaya Metro Station.

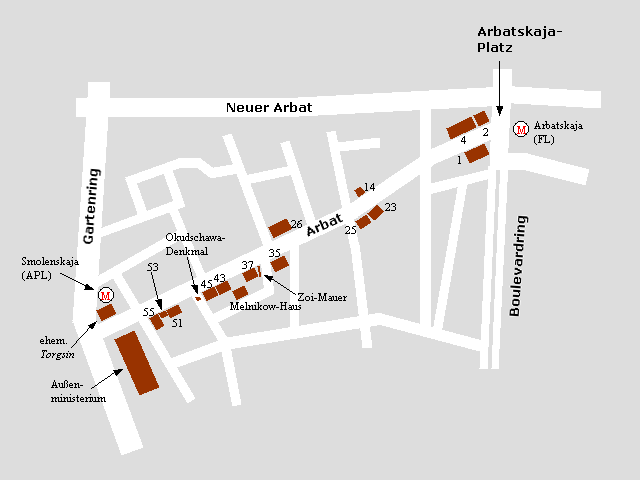
Map of the Arbat area with selected attractions (German).

Until the middle of the 20th century, the Arbat remained part of the main road from the Moscow Kremlin westwards. In the 1960s a parallel road, the New Arbat (Новый Арбат) was built, and took on this function. The New Arbat with its wide sidewalks and 1960s tower blocks has no sidestreets. Two decades later the Arbat was made into the first pedestrian zone in Moscow. In order to avoid confusion with the New Arbat, people began to refer to the Arbat as the Old Arbat (Старый Арбат).

== History ==
=== Origins and etymology ===
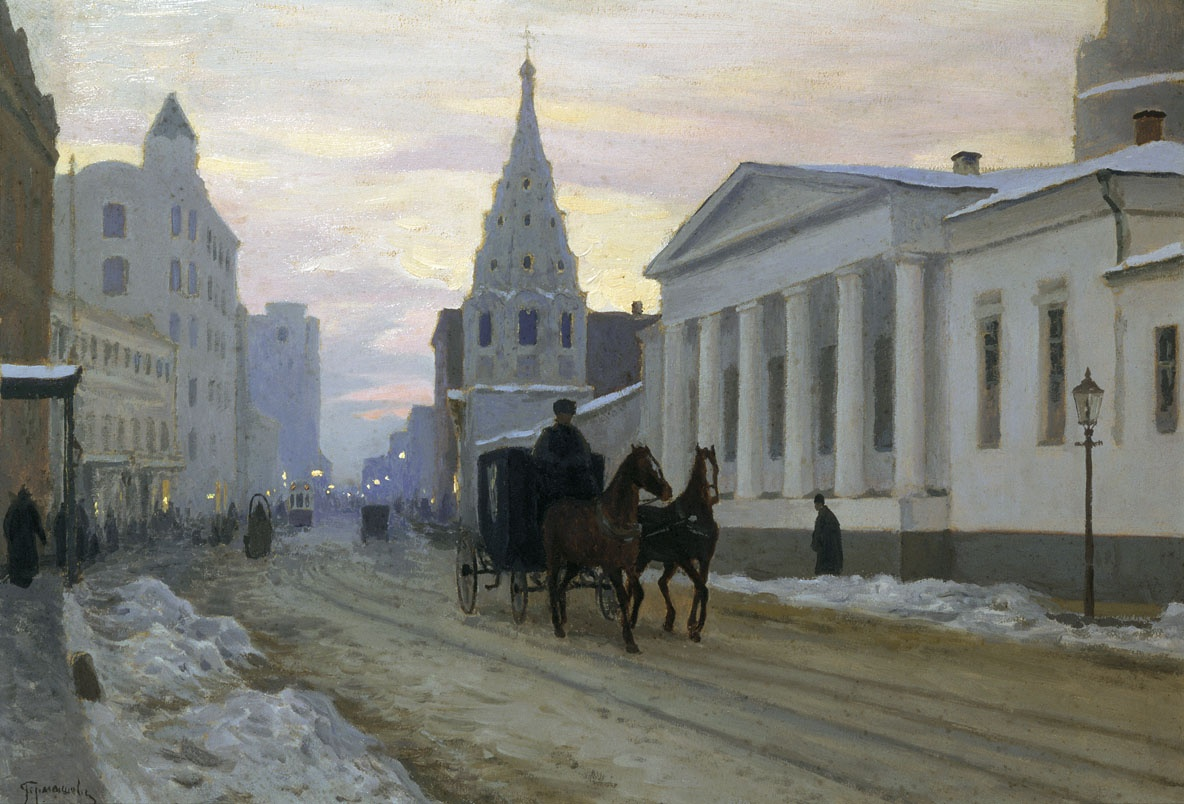
An early 20th-century view of the street.

The Arbat is one of the oldest surviving streets in Moscow. Exactly when it came into existence is not recorded, but a document from July 28, 1493, mentions it. The document describes a fire which started in the wooden Church of Nicholas on the Sand (Церковь Николы на Песках). The fire spread throughout Moscow, devastating large areas of the city, which consisted for the most part of wooden structures. The original meaning of the place name Arbat remains unknown. In addition to places with Slavic names, there are also numerous places of Oriental origin in Moscow. Geographically Moscow is located within Russia between the wooded northwest and the southwestern steppe areas. The Russian steppes in Eurasian steppes were through its history largely inhabited by nomadic tribes. Many theories assume that the term arbat is of Oriental origin.

Several hypotheses attempt to explain it:

- Probably the most widespread hypothesis states that the name comes from the Arabic word أرباض arbāḍ, meaning "suburb" or "outskirts". This fits with the fact that from the 16th century the area surrounding the Arbat did form the outer district of the city, the Kremlin being the city centre. Like many traders from various oriental cultures, the Arabs have also used the Volga river, which flows through the Russian steppe into the Caspian Sea, for their trade with Vikings. Some local historians explain the origin of the term with reference to the frequent attacks of the Crimean Khanate on Moscow in the 15th and 16th centuries, linked with the fact that many Arabic loan words had entered the Turkic languages (including Tatar) by this point.
- Another hypothesis links the word Arbat with the Tatar word arba, i.e. "cart". This is explained either by reference to the significance of the Arbat as a trade route, and thus used by traders and their carts, or by the possible existence of a workshop in the area which produced carts. In a vernacular sense, the word Arbat means neighbourhood or residential area in Tatar languages.
- In the 19th century the historian and archaeologist Ivan Yegorovich Sabelin proposed a purely Russian origin for the street name. According to him, the word Arbat derives from the adjective gorbat, i.e. "bumpy", which corresponds to the uneven nature of the land on which Moscow is built. However, this theory is disputed, as in fact the space where the Arbat is located is flatter than much of the city.
- The word Arbat is also found in the Persian language (Persian: ارباط). There is a village called Arbat in Iran.

A non-Russian origin of the word Arbat is generally held to be more likely than a Russian origin. Possibly lending some weight to this view, an Arbat Street (Арбатская улица) exists in Kolomna, 100 km southeast of Moscow. It is possible that the name of the place has Mongolian roots which came through the Golden Horde culture to Muscovite Russia. Arbat was in ancient times the name of the whole area and not just of the one street. The location of the Old Arbat was in ancient times situated between the borders of today's Sadovoe Kolco. (Garden Ring), Ermolayevski, Vozdvizhenka and Arbat.

=== 15th to 17th century ===
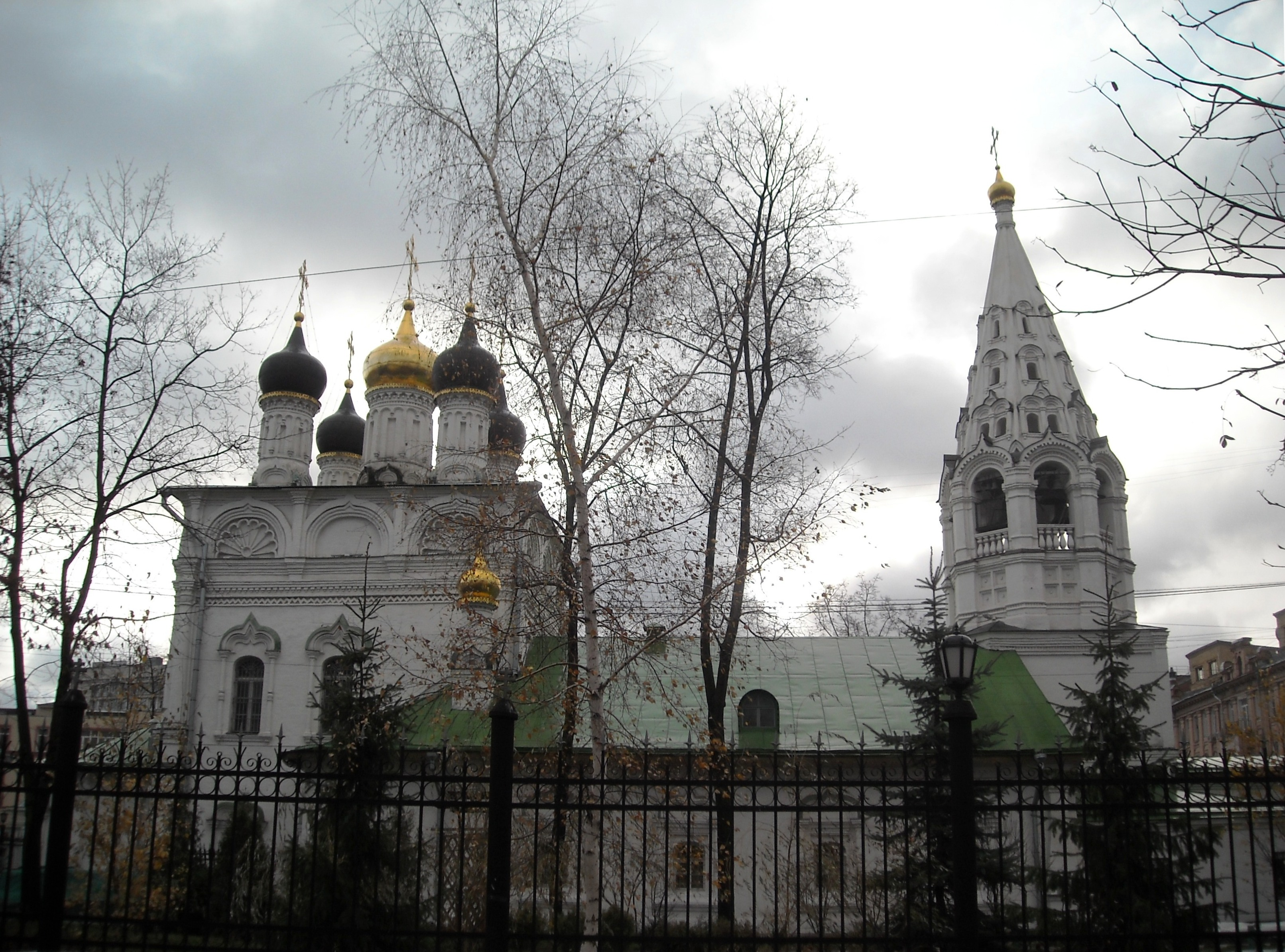
Church of the Salvation on the Sand, Arbat

As early as the 15th century the Arbat formed the first part of a road which linked Moscow — predominantly the Kremlin — with the western regions of the Grand Duchy of Moscow, and thus via Poland with other areas of Europe. This location attracted craftsmen to the Arbat, and they set up shop here en masse. This period is recalled in the names of some of the side streets off the Arbat, for example Plotnikov pereulok (Плотников переулок), i.e. "Carpenters' Lane", Serebryanyi pereulok (Серебряный переулок), i.e. "Silver Lane". As well as the workshops of craftsmen, there were also a great number of churches on the Arbat, along with some houses where merchants and members of the clergy lived.

During the reign of Ivan IV of Russia ("the Terrible"), the Arbat had a less salubrious connotation. It was here that the infamous bodyguards of the Tsar, the Oprichnina, had their headquarters. It was from here that orders were issued for mass executions and torture of alleged traitors to the crown. In Alexey Tolstoy's historical novel Ivan the Terrible we find the following interpretation of the atmosphere of the period, "News of the fearsome plans had spread throughout Moscow, and a deathly silence reigned. The shops were closed, the streets empty, and only occasionally one heard the galloping horses of the messengers of the Tsar, who had come down to the Arbat, to his favourite palace."

After the dissolution of the Oprichnina, and the death of Ivan the Terrible, the Arbat's significance as a trade route began to grow again. Not only merchants travelled this route, but also Tsars, along with their messengers and soldiers. Foreign invaders also used the Arbat when attacking the Kremlin, and when retreating in defeat. Time and again the Arbat proved important to the defence of the Kremlin: From its Eastern end, the volunteer army of Prince Dmitry Pozharsky delivered a decisive blow to the troops of the Polish-Lithuanian Field Marshal Jan Karol Chodkiewicz. In the 16th and 17th centuries, three regiments of Streltsy troops were stationed on the Arbat, to better defend the Kremlin.

During the 16th and 17th centuries, the neighbourhood was graced with elegant churches, notably the one featured in Vasily Polenov's celebrated painting A Courtyard in Moscow (1879).

=== 18th and 19th centuries ===
By the 19th century at the latest the growth of Moscow meant that the Arbat was now in the centre of the city rather than at its edge, and so it became an ever more desirable place to live. In 1736 about half the street was destroyed in yet another fire, but by the second half of the 18th century it was already being described as the "Moscow Boulevard Saint-Germain." In 1793 about 33 of the 56 houses on the Arbat belonged to nobility or to civil servants. Amongst the nobles who had houses built for them on or near the Arbat were such celebrated families as the Tolstoys, the Gagarins, the Kropotkins, the Galitzines and the Sheremetevs. Nevertheless, despite its proximity to the Kremlin and to the seat of power, the district was considered to be tranquil, almost rural. By this period there was hardly any manufacture on the street, and also less trade than in other parts of Moscow.

However the Arbat continued to serve as the most important way into and out of Moscow towards the West. During Napoleon's Russian Campaign of 1812, French troops led by Joachim Murat used the street to get to the Kremlin. This event is mentioned in Leo Tolstoy's epic novel War and Peace, written 50 years afterwards.

The fire lit during the battle for Moscow in 1812 destroyed large parts of the predominantly wooden city, and also decimated the Arbat. The results of the energetic period of rebuilding in the 1810s can still be seen today, in the surviving houses of the Empire style, which was characteristic for the period. Towards the end of the 19th century, the architecture changed to Art Nouveau, with many luxury apartment buildings being built in this style. These buildings, with as many as six or seven floors, were technologically remarkable for the period, and fitted with all modern conveniences. Around a dozen are still to be seen along the Arbat today. In the last years of the 20th century and the first of the 21st, they were all renovated and made into plush domiciles or offices.

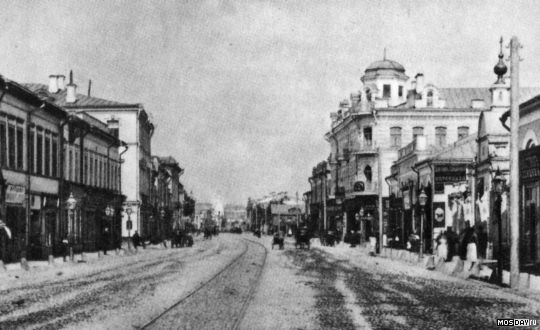
The Arbat around 1882 with the tracks of the wagonway

In the second half of the 19th century, the Arbat also moved away from being a purely aristocratic part of town, and became a popular place for artists to live. This was mainly due to the fact that many of the poets, thinkers, musicians and actors who had shaped Russia's cultural life came from the middle and lower nobility, sometimes from impoverished noble families. It was around the Arbat that Russia's intelligentsia began to develop, largely made up of young educated nobles who were not afraid to criticize society. Alexander Pushkin lodged in one of its mansions for a short time, and there is a statue of him and his wife, Natalie, in front of the house. Another famous inhabitant was the writer Andrey Bely, many of whose novels feature impressionist portrayals of the area. Thus over time the Arbat lost its richest noble inhabitants, who preferred the splendid districts around the Kremlin and Tverskaya Street over the would-be rural idyll of the Arbat. By the start of the 20th century, the Arbat had become popular with the middle classes, and academics, doctors and lawyers settled in the area.

=== 20th century and today ===
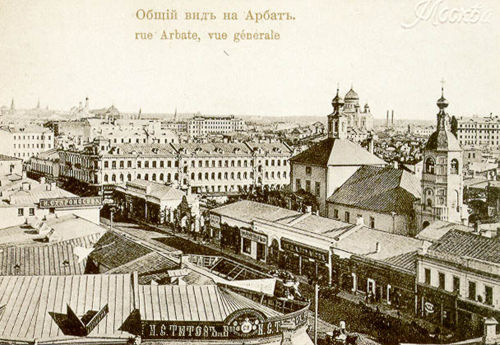
A postcard of the Arbat from the start of the 20th century

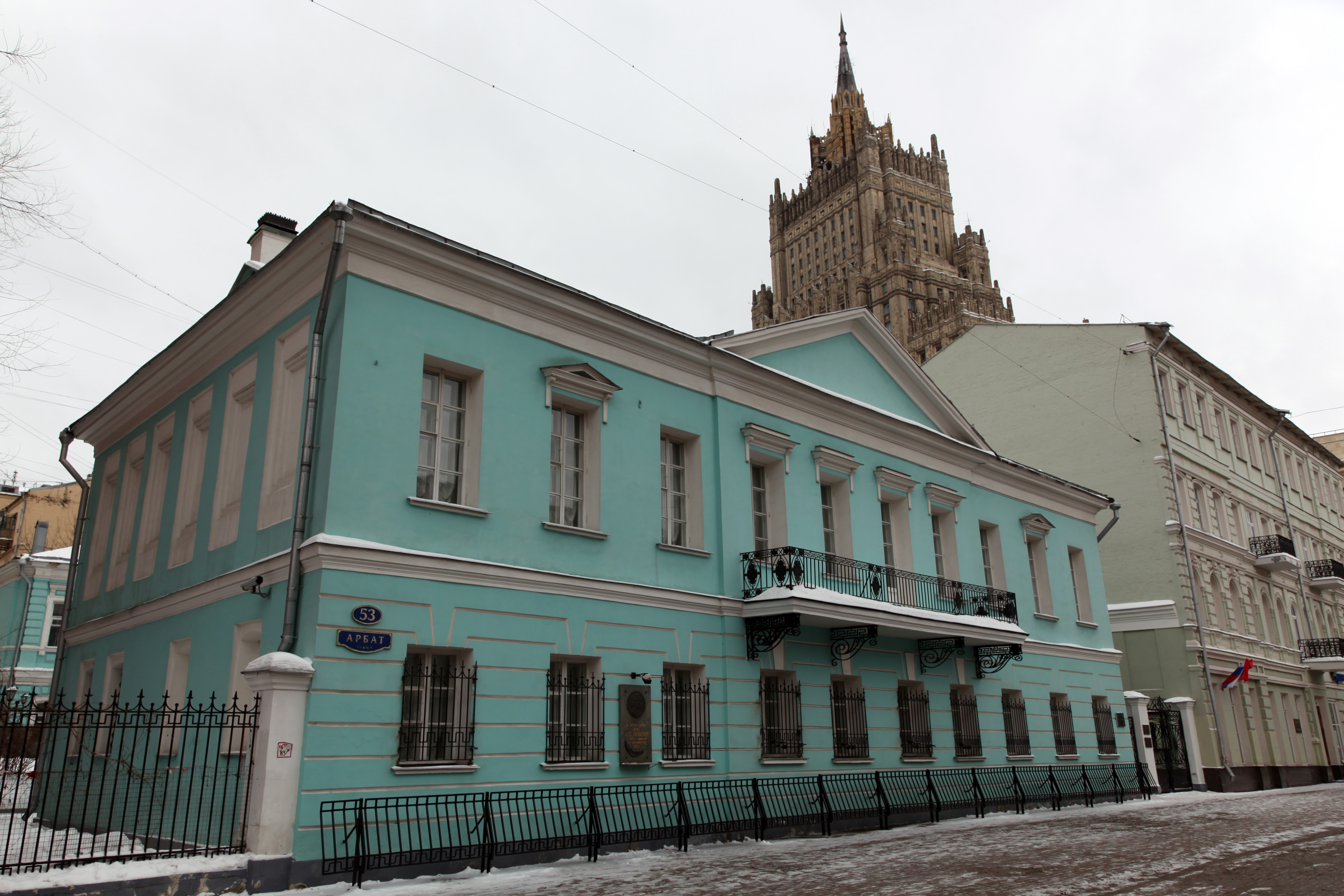
The Pushkin Museum, Arbat no. 53

In the first two decades of the 20th century comfortable new apartment buildings were built on the Arbat, which still contribute to the overall appearance of the street. The main inhabitants were now well-off academics, as well as a small number of artists. The Arbat's transport connections were also improved in the first half of the 20th century. In 1904 electric trams were introduced, which were replaced 30 years later by trolleybuses (electric buses which get their power from overhead lines similar to those of a tram). For this reason the previous cobbles were replaced with an asphalt surface. In 1935 Moscow's first Metro station opened on Arbatskaya Square. The fact that the Arbat remained part of the road between Moscow and Smolensk facilitated trade. Arbat became a busy shopping street with many renowned boutiques. At the beginning of the 20th century the most intense business activity took place near the Western end: on the site of today's Smolenskaya Square, a large farmers' market used to take place, the Smolensky Rynok (Смоленский рынок). Furthermore, in 1899 Kiev Station was built, a few hundred metres to the west of the Arbat, which further increased the influx of traders from Ukraine and Southeastern Europe into Moscow via the Arbat.

After the October Revolution of 1917, the Bolsheviks confiscated private property on the Arbat, as they did elsewhere in Russia, and made the buildings state property. Nevertheless, the street did not immediately lose its reputation as a haunt for artists. Through the 1920s this began to change, as mass immigration from the countryside into the capital put enormous pressure on housing. For this reason, the previous apartment buildings were made into kommunalkas, apartments where more than one family lived together. Furthermore, the area served more and more to accommodate the high-ranking functionaries of the Communist Party of the Soviet Union. This period is described in Anatoli Rybakov's novel Children of the Arbat (Дети Арбата} This is the reason for the plain apartment buildings in the side streets off the Arbat, some of which replaced earlier, more architecturally significant buildings. Furthermore, most of the Arbat's churches were demolished, including that of St Nicholas, regarded as one of the finest examples of the style of the Boris Godunov period. For visiting functionaries a luxury hotel was also built near the Arbat, the Arbat Hotel (Гостиница Арбат) in Plotnikov Street. Some buildings were also renovated or built in the constructivist style. Probably the most original monument to this new trend is the Melnikov Mansion.

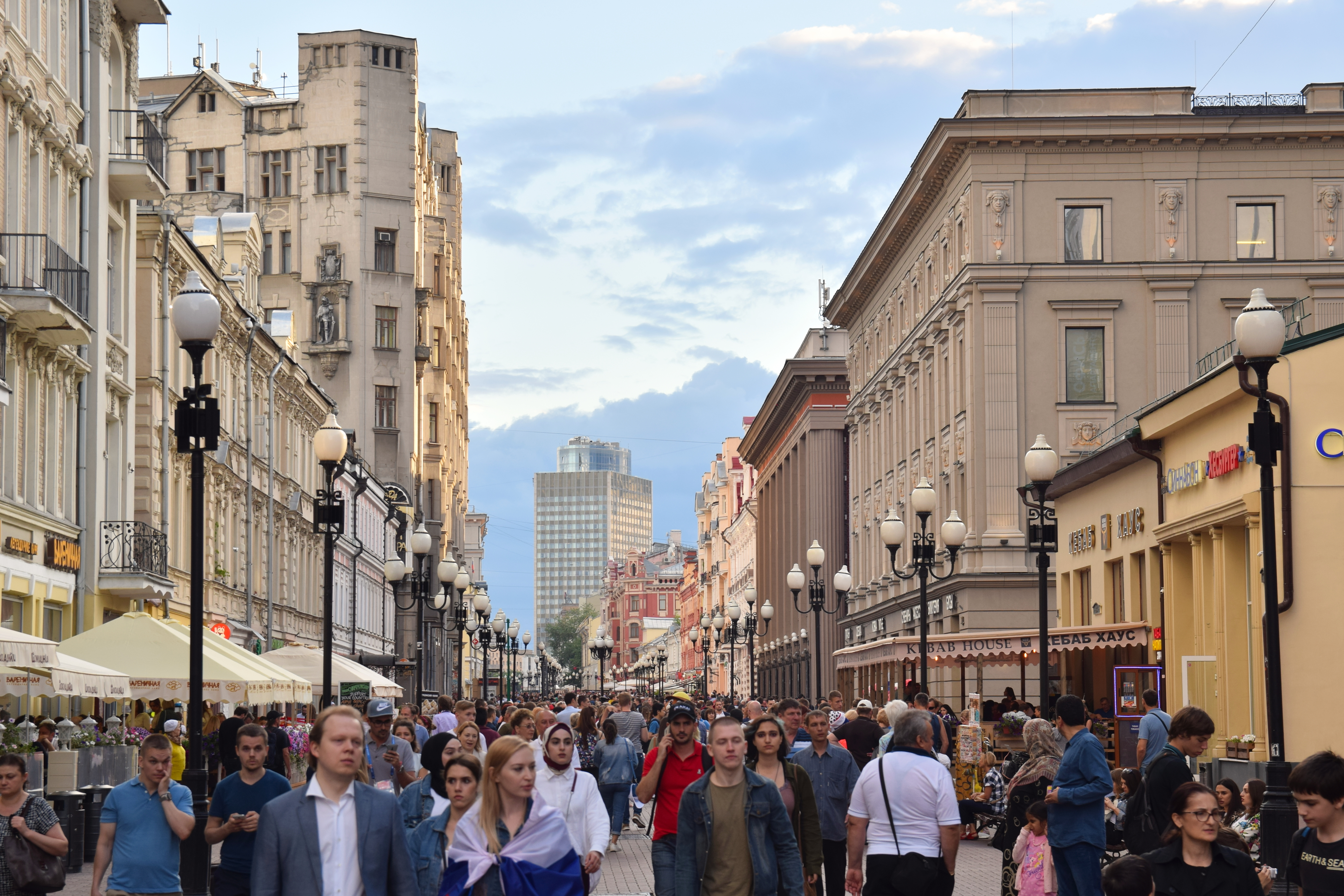
The Arbat in July 2018

In the early 1980s the Arbat, which had been a busy street in terms of traffic, was closed off and made into a pedestrian zone one of the first in the Soviet Union. This happened at the same time as the construction of a new Ministry of Defence building on Arbatskaya Square, which required a great number of communications, pipes and wires to be laid beneath the Arbat. The renovation of the street and many of its historical buildings was completed in 1986. During Perestroika, the street was a gathering place for informal youth movements (like hippies or punks), as well as street musicians and artists. Tsoi's Wall in one of the Arbat side streets (Krivoarbatskiy Pereulok) remains a curious monument to those turbulent years. To this day, Russian youth frequently gather on the Arbat to play Tsoi's songs and those of other Russian songwriters. However, the overall appearance of the Arbat is dominated by street artists, souvenir stalls and shops, restaurants, cafés and bars.

== Attractions ==
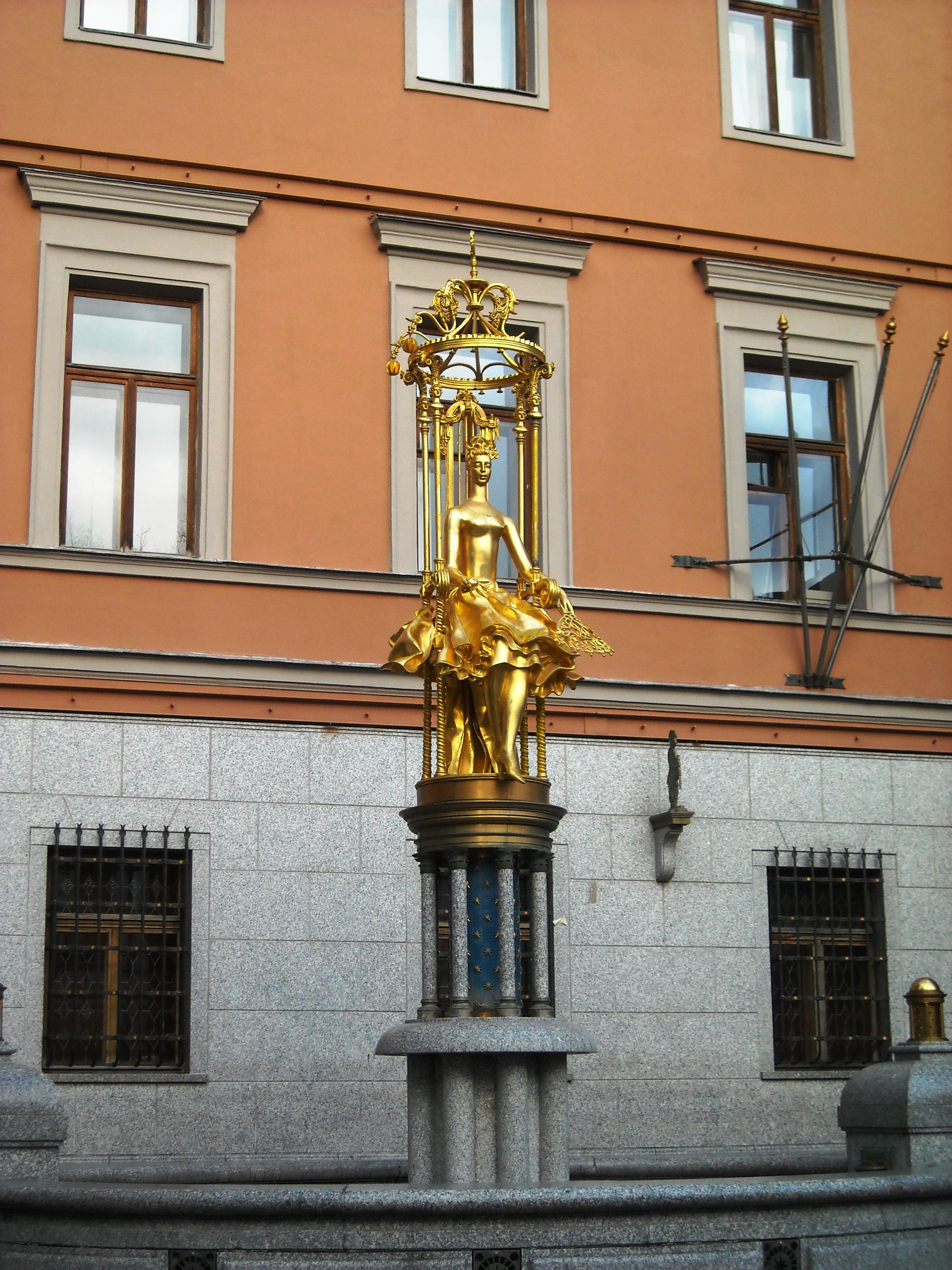
Princess Turandot

Since 1986, the Arbat has been dotted with distinctive street lanterns. It has several notable statues, including one to Princess Turandot in front of the Vakhtangov Theatre, and another to Soviet-era folk singer, bard and poet Bulat Okudzhava, who wrote several poignant songs about the Arbat. Arbat is home to the headquarters of oil company TNK-BP - a modern building at the beginning of the street. It also contains numerous restaurants, including The Hard Rock Cafe. Most of these restaurants are geared towards visitors to Moscow and are considered by many residents to be over-priced and of low quality compared to those in other parts of the city. There are also a few restaurants and cafés that cater to the working population and middle class; these include Praim, and Mu-Mu's.

== See also ==
- Azabu-Jūban district in Minato ward, very similar location positioned nearby to the center (very slightly to the south from it) of Tokyo, Japan.
