= Znamenka Street =

Street in Moscow, Russia

Coordinates: 55°43′27″N 37°35′18″E

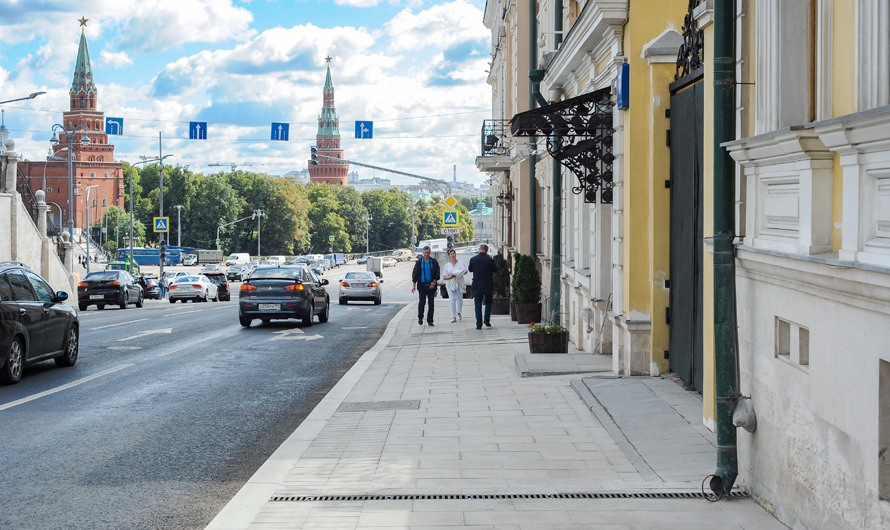
- Znamenka Street in 2016
- Interactive map of Znamenka Street
- Native name: Улица Знаменка (Russian)
- Length: 0.65 km (0.40 mi)
- Location: Moscow, Russia; Central Administrative Okrug
- Nearest metro station: Filyovskaya line Arbatskaya; Serpukhovsko-Timiryazevskaya line Borovitskaya

Znamenka Street is a street in Khamovniki District of Moscow. It runs from Borovitskaya Square to Arbatskaya Square, lies between Kolymazhny Lane and Vozdvizhenka Street. The numbering of houses is carried out from Borovitskaya Square.

== Etymology ==
The name appeared at the end of the 16th century and it is named after the Church of the Sign of the Most Holy Theotokos (demolished in 1931). After the Russian Revolution, Znamenka was renamed into Krasnoznamyonnaya Street, and in 1925 into Frunze Street - in honor of the famous Soviet military leader Mikhail Frunze, who died in the same year, who worked in the building of the Revolutionary Military Council located on the street. In 1990, the street was reverted to its original name.

== Geography ==
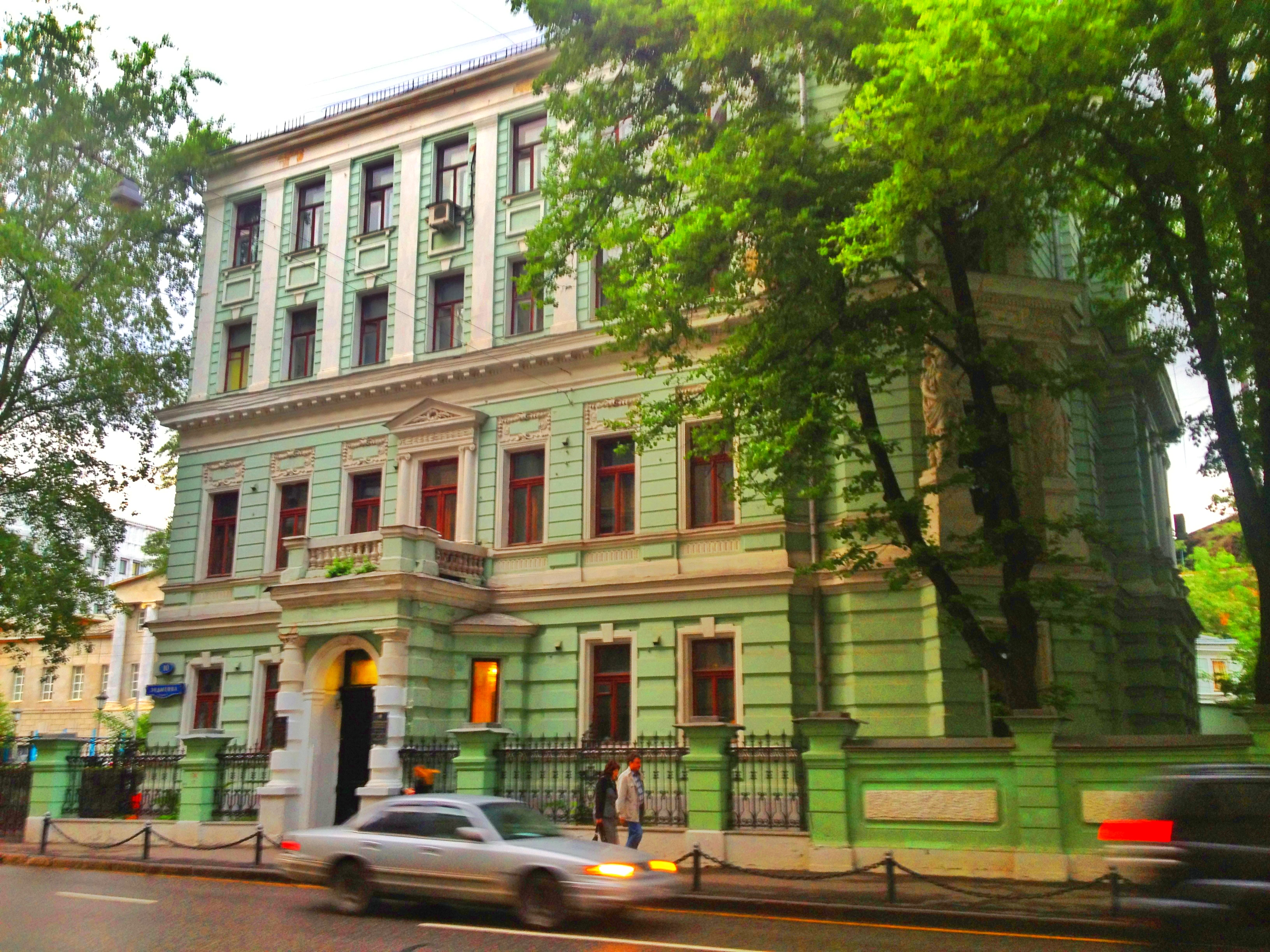
Institute of state and law, Znamenka 10

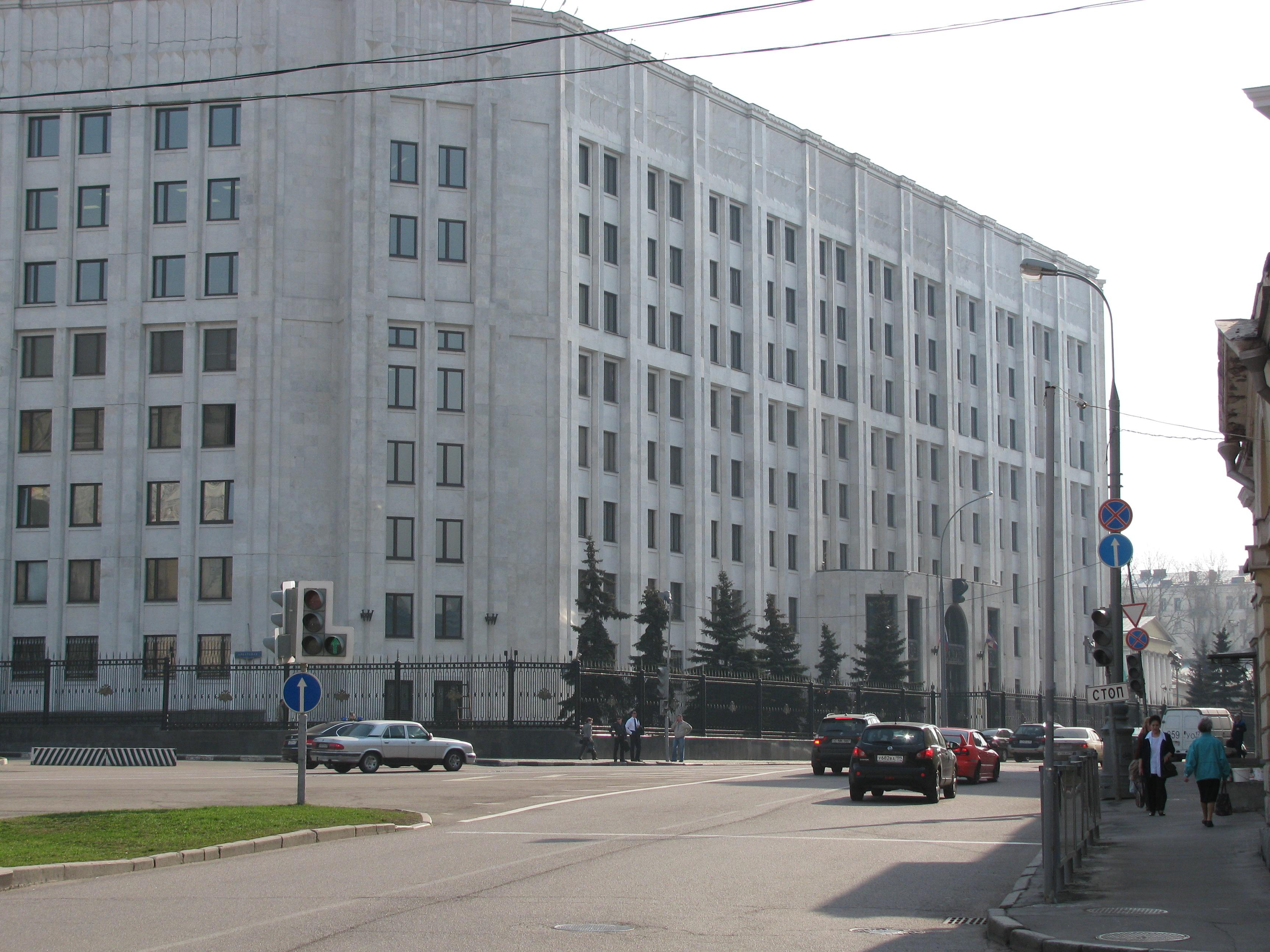
1985 building of the AFRF General Staff, Znamenka 14

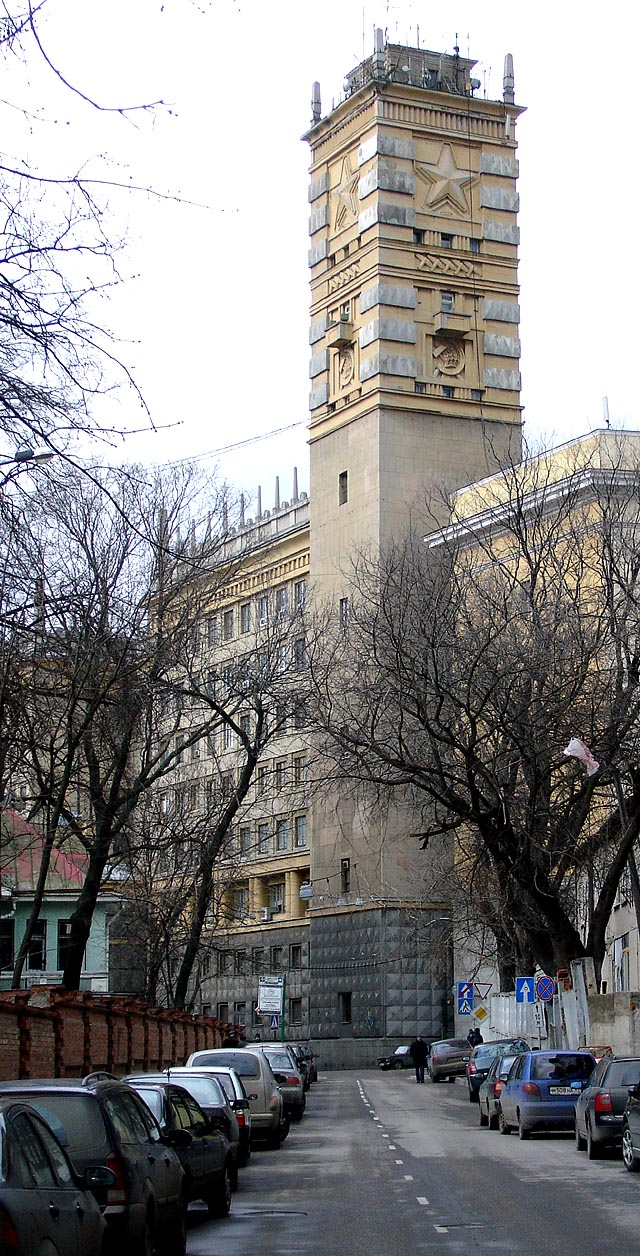
Old building of the AFRF General Staff, Znamenka 19

The street is near to the Kremlin and many official buildings are located here, for example:

- Institute of State and Law
- General Staff of the Armed Forces of the Russian Federation
