= Arbatskaya Square =

Square in Moscow, Russia

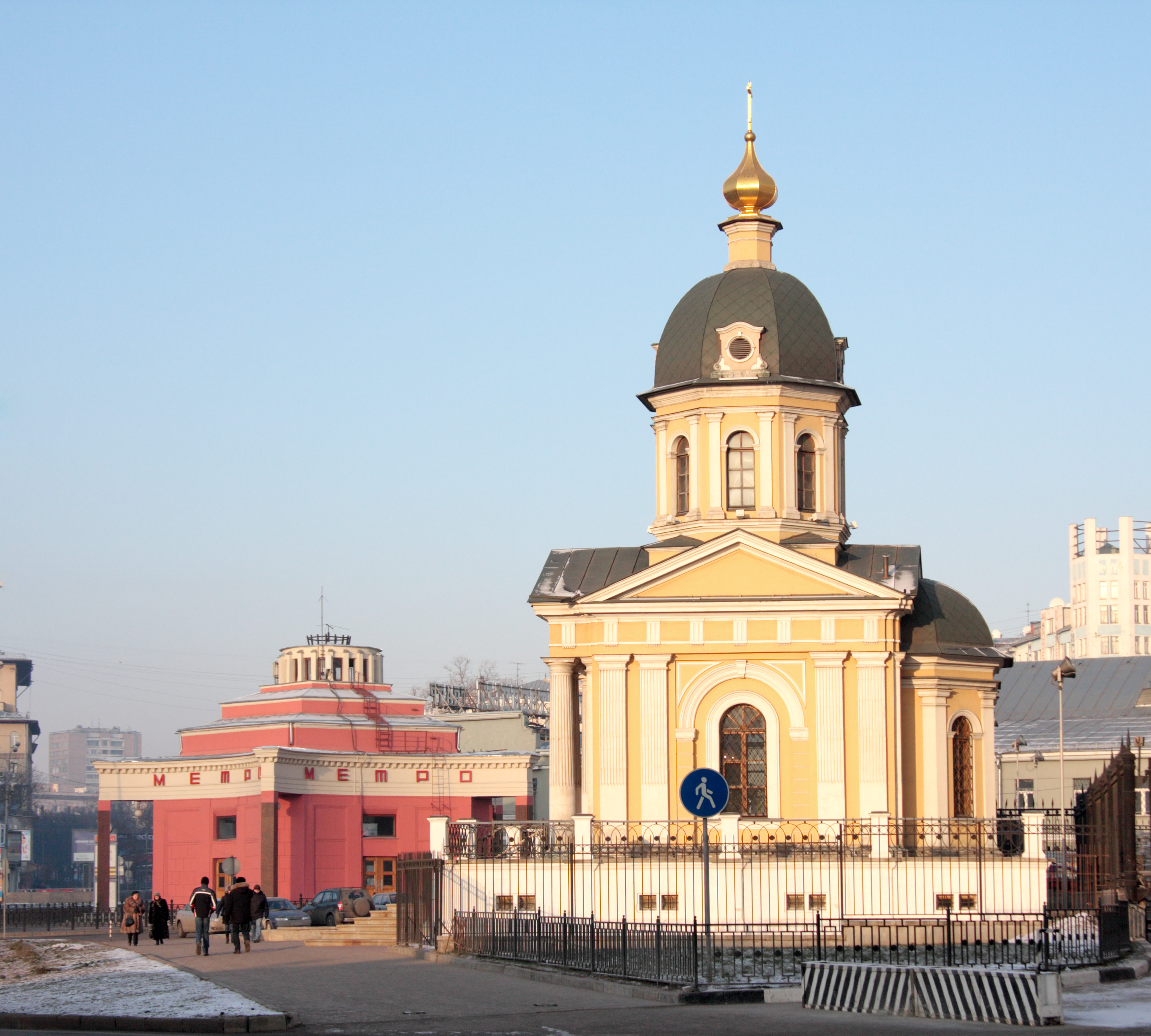
- Chapel of Sts. Boris and Gleb was constructed in front of the Ministry of Defense in 1997 in place of a similar church destroyed 70 years earlier.
- Interactive map of Arbatskaya Square
- Native name: Арбатская площадь (Russian)
- Location: Moscow; Central Administrative Okrug; Arbat District
- Nearest metro station: Arbatskaya; Arbatskaya
- Coordinates: 55.7519°N 37.6011°E

Arbatskaya Square or Arbat Square (Russian: Арба́тская пло́щадь) is one of the oldest squares of Moscow, located on the junction of Gogolevsky Boulevard, Znamenka Street and Arbat Gates Square (in 1925–1993 – part of Arbatskaya Square).

The square is home to the Arbatskaya metro station, on Filyovskaya Line.

== History and layout ==
The square was built after the demolition of the Arbat Gate of Bely Gorod in the 1750s-1770s, so it was colloquially called the Arbat Gate for several decades. Present-day square is dominated by the wide avenue of New Arbat, however, prior to the redevelopment of the 1960s, the square was located south of this avenue, on the line of Arbat Street and the vestibule of Arbatskaya subway station.

There was no straight connection between Vozdvizhenka and Arbat: westbound coaches had to make a sharp turn south into Nikitsky Boulevard, past a corner block on this boulevard, then make a turn west into either Arbat, Povarskaya Street, Bolshaya Molchanovka, Malaya Molchanovka or Merzlyakovsky Lane. All four streets fanned out west from the square. In 1807–1812, it hosted Arbatsky Theater, which perished in the Fire of Moscow (1812), as well as most of the neighborhoods around it.

The Arbat Fountain, originally a fire reservoir (1840s), later a decorative fountain, was located in the south of the square, on the line of Maly Afanasyevsky Lane. In 1945, it was refitted with sculptures and granite slabs in stalinist style, only to be destroyed in the 1960s.
