= Arbat District =

District of central Moscow, Russia

Arbat District район Арбат
- District
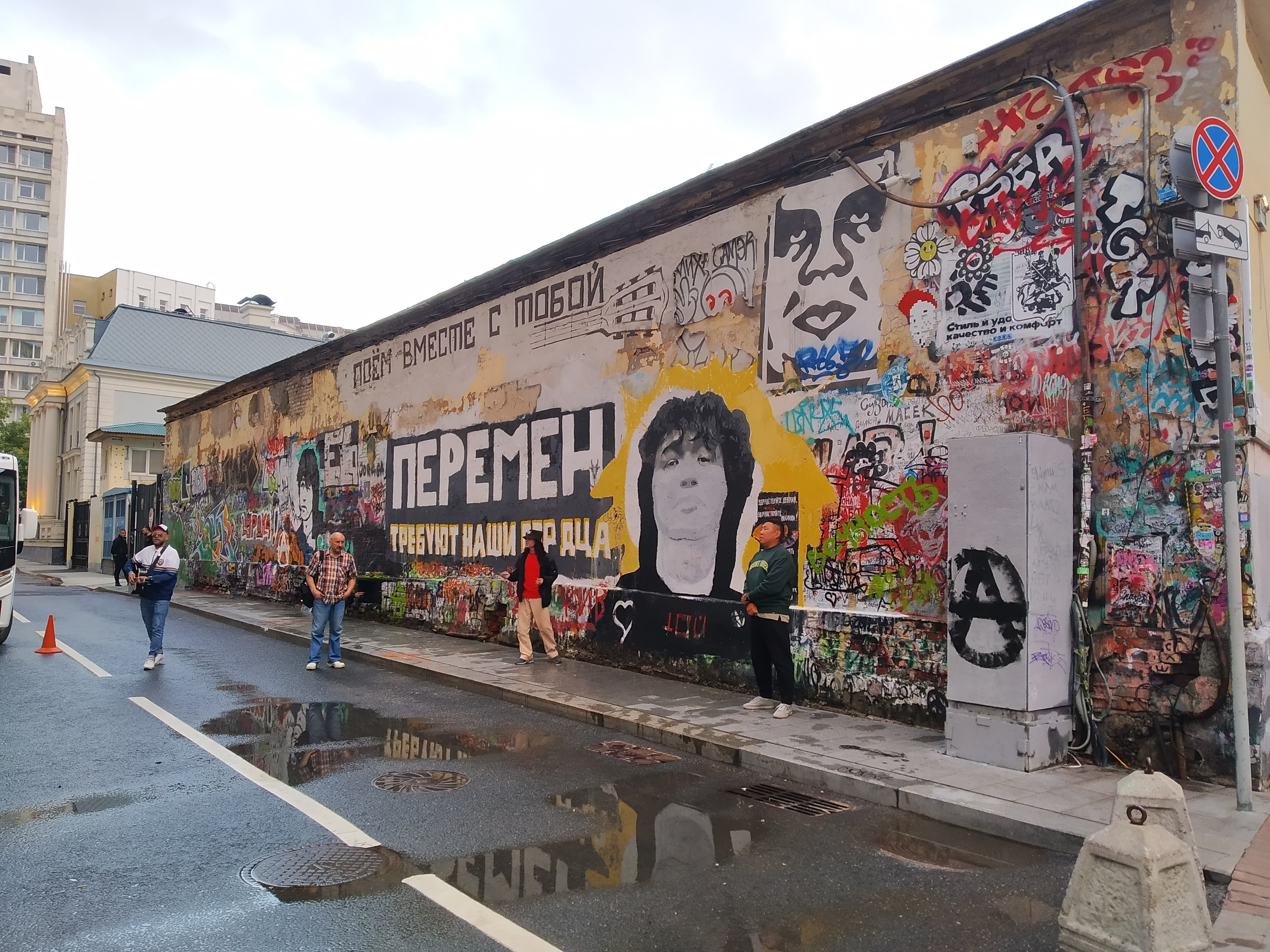

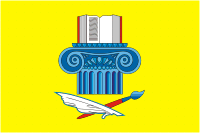
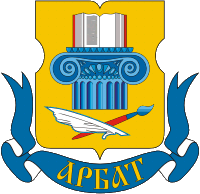
- Flag Coat of arms
- Coordinates: 55°45′4″N 37°35′24″E
- Country: Russia
- Federal subject: Moscow
- Time zone: UTC+3 (MSK)
- OKTMO ID: 45374000

Arbat District (Russian: район Арбат) is a district of Central Administrative Okrug of the federal city of Moscow, Russia. Population: 28,179 (2010 Census); 25,699 (2002 Census).

The district extends from central Mokhovaya Street west to Novoarbatsky Bridge over the Moskva River. Its irregular boundaries correspond roughly to Znamenka Street and Sivtsev Vrazhek Lane in the south and Povarskaya Street in the north. Main radial streets are Vozdvizhenka Street, New Arbat Street and pedestrian Arbat Street.

== Economy ==
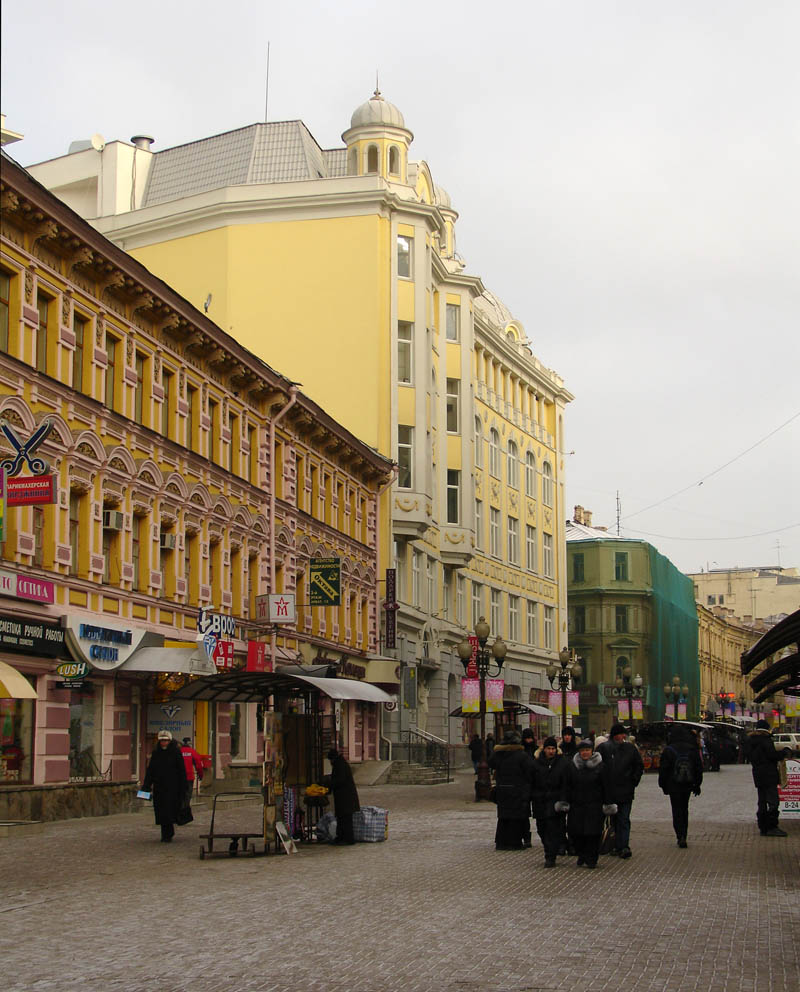
Aeroflot head office

Aeroflot has its head office in the district.

== See also ==
- Arbat Street
- Spaso House, residence of the US ambassador
