= Arbatskaya (Filyovskaya line) =

Moscow Metro station

Arbatskaya Арбатская
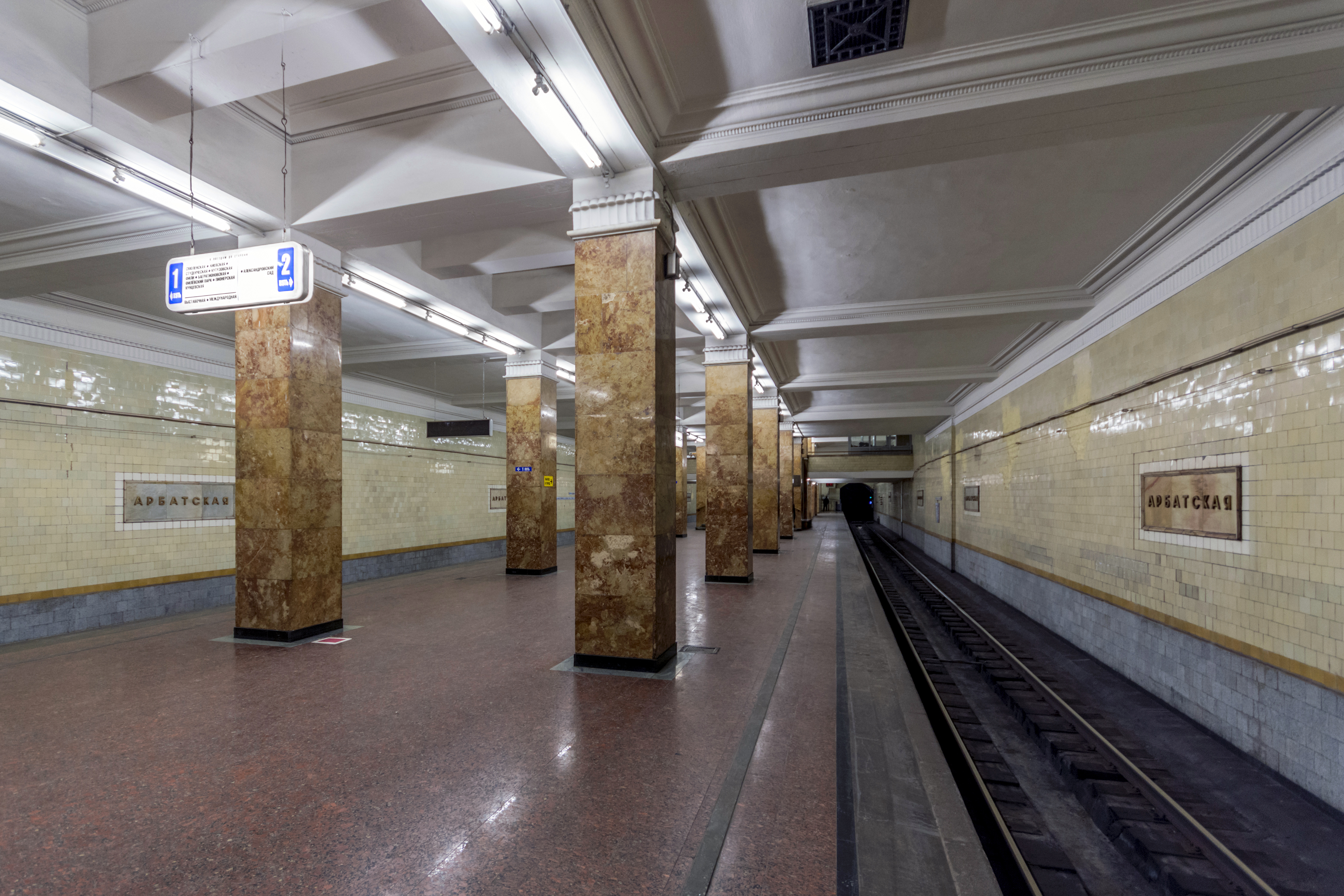

General information
- Location: Arbat District; Central Administrative Okrug; Moscow; Russia
- Coordinates: 55.7518°N 37.6007°E
- System: Moscow Metro station
- Owner: Moskovsky Metropoliten
- Line: Filyovskaya line
- Platforms: 1
- Tracks: 2

Construction
- Depth: 8 metres (26 ft)
- Platform levels: 1
- Parking: No

Other information
- Station code: 055

History
- Opened: 15 May 1935; 91 years ago
- Closed: 5 April 1953; 73 years ago to 7 July 1958; 68 years ago

Passengers
- 2002: 4,416,500

Services
Preceding station	Moscow Metro	Following station
Smolenskaya towards Kuntsevskaya or Mezhdunarodnaya	Filyovskaya line	Aleksandrovsky Sad Terminus
Route map
Location
- Location within Central Moscow

Arbatskaya (Russian: Арба́тская) is a station on the Filyovskaya line of the Moscow Metro. Completed in 1935, it was one of the original Metro stations. The design is the same standard pillar-trispan template used for Smolenskaya, Sokolniki, and Park Kultury. The pillars are faced with pinkish marble and the platform is a matching shade of granite. The walls are covered with cream-colored ceramic tile. The architect was L. Teplitskiy.

Arbatskaya's vestibule is a five-tiered, pentagonal structure with the word "Metro" written on all sides. The building is currently painted bright red.

== In popular culture ==
The station and Arbatskaya on the Arbatsko–Pokrovskaya line are featured in the Resident Evil: Retribution Moscow segment.
