= Vilenkin =

Vilenkin is a surname of Russian origin. Notable people with the surname include:

- Alexander Vilenkin (born 1949), Russian-American cosmogonist
- Naum Ya. Vilenkin, Russian mathematician
- Nikolai Maksimovich Vilenkin better known as Nikolai Minsky, mystical writer and poet of the Silver Age of Russian Poetry
