= Melnikov House =

Workshop house of Konstantin Stepanovich Melnikov

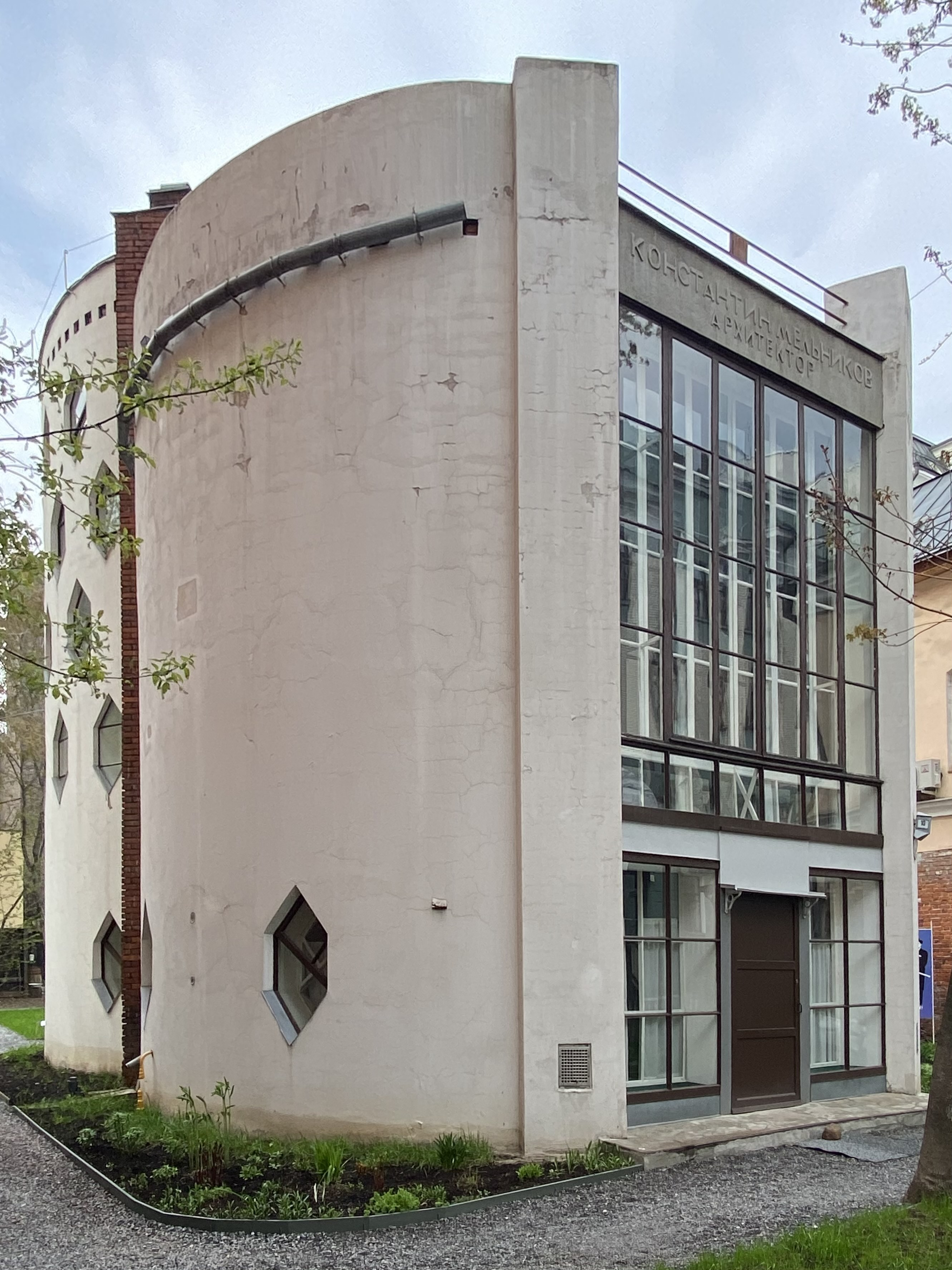
- View of the Melnikov House from the lane side in May 2021
- Interactive map of Melnikov House
- Location: 10, Krivoarbatsky Lane, Moscow, Russian Federation
- Coordinates: 55°44′53″N 37°35′22″E
- Designer: Konstantin Melnikov
- Builder: Московское коммунальное хозяйство
- Beginning date: 1927
- Completion date: 1929
- Website: https://muar.ru/dom-melnikova

The Melnikov House (the workshop house of the architect Konstantin Stepanovich Melnikov) is a one-apartment residential house, a landmark building of the Soviet avant-garde. It was built in 1927–1929 in Krivoarbatsky Lane in Moscow by the outstanding Soviet architect Konstantin Melnikov for himself and his family.

The Workshop House is considered the pinnacle of Melnikov's work due to its innovative design features, original artistic image, and well-thought-out functional layout. This one-apartment residential mansion, located near the centre of Moscow, is a unique example of this type of construction during the Soviet era. It was completed before Melnikov was 40 and would be his last building.

In 2011, the Shchusev Museum of Architecture took over the management of the building, which is now displayed as a part of its branch, the Melnikov Museum, established in 2014.

In 2022, the interiors of the house were closed to the public due to restoration. However, visitors can still access the garden and inspect the exterior.

== History of creation ==
=== Searching for an architectural and planning solution ===
Konstantin Melnikov dreamed of having his own separate workshop house while studying at the Moscow School of Painting, Sculpture and Architecture. Initially, he planned to purchase a pre-built house and renovate it. He searched for a suitable building in Moscow for a long time. The architect's plans for the reconstruction of one of Moscow's old stone houses in the neoclassical style, created in 1916–1917, have survived. The traditional layout and appearance of Melnikov's first sketches for his own house can be attributed to the influence of his former teacher, the architect Ivan Zholtovsky. Melnikov studied under Zholtovsky at the architectural department of the school and worked under his guidance from 1917 in the Architectural and Planning Workshop of the Construction Department of the Mossovet, which was the first state architectural workshop of the Soviet era.

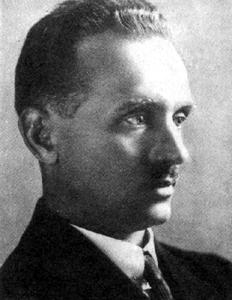
Architect Konstantin Melnikov, 1920s

However, in the early 1920s, Melnikov began working intensively on sketches for an innovative style house. The architect's personal archive contains various versions of his own house projects, all of which propose the construction of a workshop house that combines both domestic and working environments. Melnikov was so attached to his family that he could not imagine working in any other atmosphere but his home.

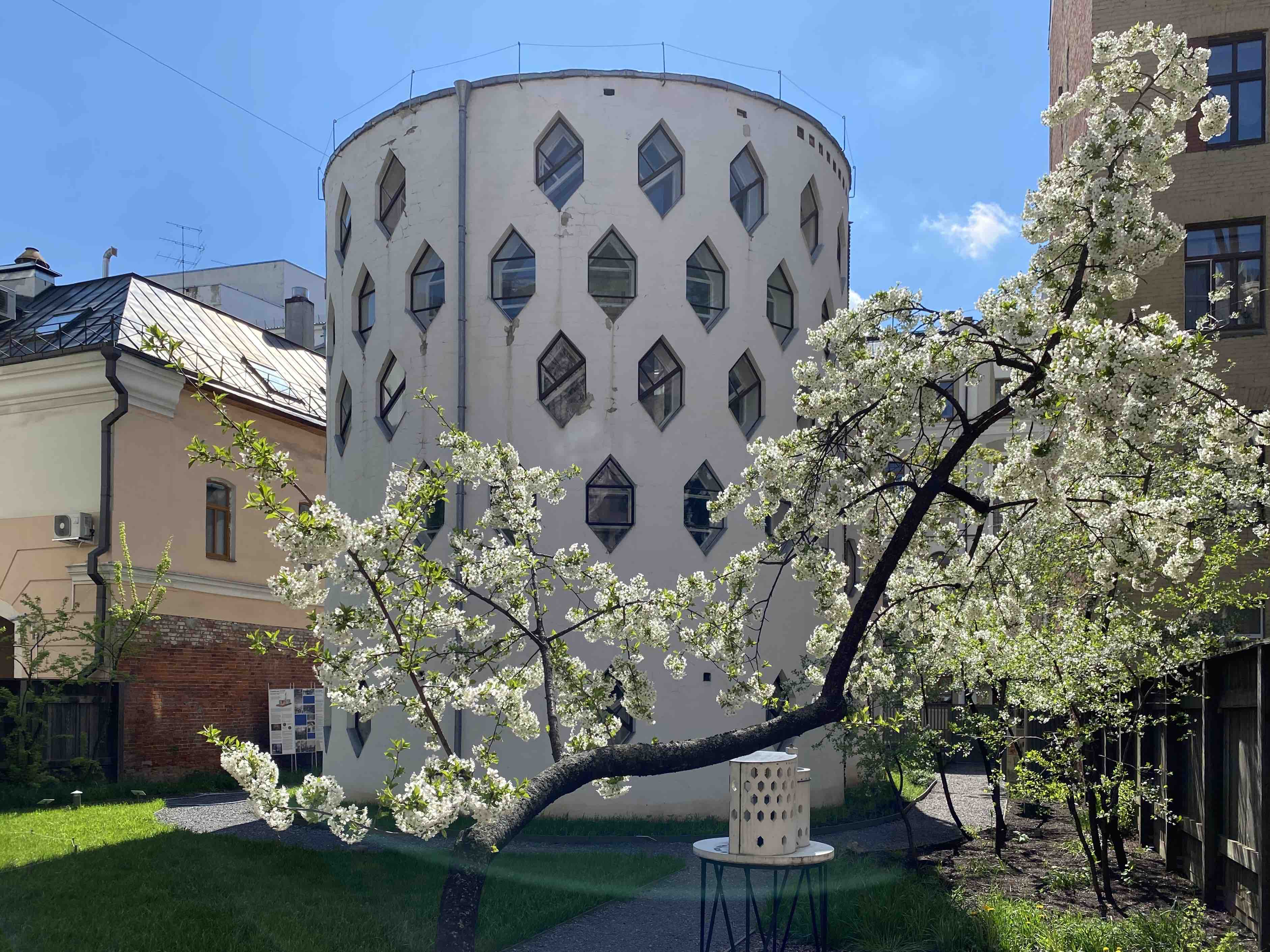
View of the Melnikov House from the courtyard, May 2020

Unlike Melnikov's other buildings, the architect designed his own workshop house based solely on his personal taste and ideas about the housing and working environment. During the preparation of the house sketches, Melnikov acted in two roles simultaneously – as the client and the designer – and could afford maximum freedom of form-creation.

The initial known design for the new house is a two-storey square building with a large angled Russian stove in the centre of the first floor. Other sketches depict the house as a truncated pyramid, with small mezzanine rooms suspended in a single interior space. At the same time, in both the initial and subsequent versions of the house project, Melnikov focused more on the interior and layout of the premises than on the external appearance of the house. He aimed to create a space that would suit the needs of himself and his family.

Experiments with a circular plan first appeared in Melnikov's drawings in 1922. The architect sketched an oval and even an egg-shaped building, while continuing to develop the interior. The final version of the project, which combines two cylinders intersecting each other, is believed by researchers of Melnikov's work to have originated from an unrealised project for the Zuev Club. In 1927, Melnikov participated in a competition to design this club. He described his design as 'a pipe organ of five cylinders'. Later, when the building was being constructed according to Ilya Golosov's design, Melnikov decided to incorporate at least some of his ideas into his own house. The house featured a series of vertical cylinders inscribed in each other.

"There were two of us – the contenders – and two objects," Konstantin Melnikov recalled, "and we decided to introduce a cylinder into Golosov's project, which still sounds lonely with a decorative solo. That's what people did, good people, but Architecture did not forgive them for the torn idea and came back to me in the brilliant duet of our house".

K. Melnikov's first sketches of his own house in the early 1920s.
Sketches of a square workshop house, 1920–1921	One of the "round" versions of the project, 1922

The curvilinear structure of the new house may have been influenced by the fact that the Melnikov family lived in a communal apartment for a long time (from 1918 to November 1929) before moving into their own house in Krivoarbatsky Lane. One of the rooms in the communal apartment had a plan in the shape of a quarter circle and overlooked five windows on the corner of Petrovka Street and Strastnoy Boulevard. The architect took into account the type of family life formed in the flat on Petrovka when designing the mansion. The main furniture purchased for the flat became the basis for the furnishings of the workshop house.

=== Construction: structural features of walls and shells ===
Melnikov's house is unique because, in the late 1920s, when the NEP was winding down in the USSR and the construction of communal houses began all over the country, one man was allowed to build a private house in the centre of the capital. Several explanations exist for this fact.

Melnikov's house was an officially recognised experimental building. The architect tested the idea of a round house here, which could later be used in other projects due to its cost-effectiveness and simplicity of construction, including the construction of communal houses. (Note: Based on the design of his own house, Konstantin Melnikov developed three housing projects: a communal house, a block house and a sectional house. However, these projects were never built.)

By the mid-1920s, Konstantin Melnikov was one of the most respected Soviet architects not only in the USSR, but in the world, as a Soviet architect. He grew to fame through building the USSR's pavilion for the World's Fair of Decorative Arts and Applied Arts in Paris. (Note: The extent of Melnikov's popularity in Paris is recorded in Ilya Ehrenburg's story "The Summer of 1925", where there is an episode that shows how "the fashion for Melnikov reached the widest strata of Parisians, who are susceptible to any novelty, became a sign of the times and a rumour of the street: a random passer-by calls out to her companion the most acute signs of modernity in her opinion – football, jazz, a pavilion built by Melnikov..." (see И. Эренбург, Лето 1925 года. Moscow, p. 205).)

Thirdly, the architect built his workshop house in 1927–1929, when he had a large number of real orders and could allocate funds for construction from the family budget. The total amount of fees he had received for the Bakhmetievsky and Novo-Ryazansky workshop projects by the time the actual construction of the house began in September 1927 was 10,900 roubles. It was this sum that the architect paid in 1927. At the same time, the initial construction estimate was 25,140 rubles, which rose to 37,846 rubles by October 1929. The construction of the house was carried out by the building organisation of the Moscow Municipal Services, exclusively at the architect's expense. (After two years of correspondence and negotiations with the Moscow authorities, on 1 October 1929, when the construction of the house was actually completed, Konstantin Melnikov received a repair and construction loan of 27,000 roubles for 15 years). Due to the fact that the building under construction was considered a pilot construction, Melnikov was also exempted from the building tax and ground rent by the decision of the Presidium of the Moscow City Executive Committee of the Moscow City Council of 11 November 1933.

Finally, there is the version that the architect received the land as a reward from the Soviet authorities for his work on Lenin's first sarcophagus in 1924.

Konstantin Melnikov himself described in his memoirs the process of deciding to build his own house in Krivoarbatsky pereulok:

"In 1927 the plots for building were distributed from the Mossovet by Comrade Domarev. Having seen the model of our house, he resolutely refused all competitors from state institutions, saying that it was easier to find plots than to build a house of such architecture. "Give Melnikov the plot". He was not an architect and hardly educated, he was just a labourer".

Approved project documentation (July 1927)
Schematic plan of the site with coordinating captions and notes by K. Melnikov	Approved construction project. Floor plans and building in section	Explanatory note by K. Melnikov with a drawing of the building wall structure

The version of the project approved for construction was dated 19 June 1927. The general volumetric and spatial composition of the workshop building was finally defined in this project. However, the details of the building's design were significantly refined by Melnikov during the construction process. Along with the project, the architect made a detachable model of the building, which made it possible to see the architectural composition and internal layout of the future workshop building. The model was needed to obtain a building plot and to explain the complex volumetric and spatial structure of the building to the builders.

The main differences between the original (1927) and the realised (1929) designs:

- Both cylinders in the original project had a shared sloping roof, and their heights varied slightly from each other. This was due to the intended inclusion of a mezzanine floor with two rooms for children, instead of the balcony-terrace that was ultimately constructed.
- The original plan did not include a basement floor with a calorifier in order to save money. The stove was intended to be placed in the centre of the second floor, which greatly limited Melnikov's room layout options. However, during construction, the wall foundations of the previous pre-revolutionary house were discovered. During the construction process, a small cellar was incorporated under the front cylinder, which could accommodate a 14 m^{2} calorifier chamber. This allowed the architect to create a free plan for the first floor.
- Due to the presence of the stove on the first floor, the staircase that is located in the area where two cylinders intersect, is shifted towards the inside of the front cylinder, closer to the entrance of the house in the original design.
- The original project did not include the hexagonal windows, which have become the symbol of the house. Instead, Melnikov planned to have two narrow stained glass windows that would cut vertically through the entire rear cylinder and face west and east, respectively. To clarify, the hexagonal openings, referred to as "vents" (Russian "продухи") by Melnikov, were originally included in the construction to reduce the use of expensive and scarce bricks while also ensuring even distribution of loads. It was only during the construction process that the architect decided to repurpose some of these vents as window openings.

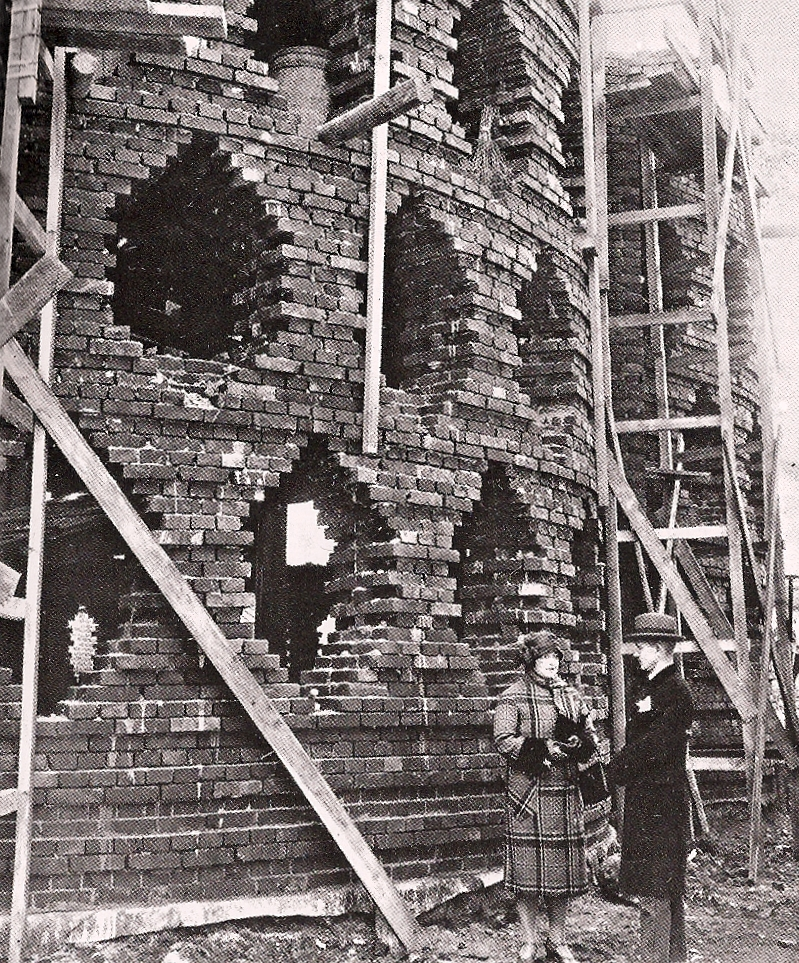
House frame in the process of construction (Melnikov and his wife Anna Gavrilovna in front of the house), 1927

The workshop house's walls and floors feature original and technically innovative structures, some of which Melnikov attempted to patent but was unsuccessful.

The house walls are made of red brick with a patterned masonry that creates an openwork frame. The masonry was carried out according to the design with a shift along the wall in a row and across the wall in two rows. As a result, 124 hexagonal openings were formed in the outer walls of the house, according to Melnikov himself. Other sources suggest that the walls originally contained "about 200" or 100 openings. During construction, almost half of the openings were filled, leaving 64 for windows and niches. The original wall framework allows for the relocation of window openings without compromising the load-bearing structures. New windows can be built almost anywhere in the wall and existing ones can be closed if necessary. During construction, loose sand, clay, and broken bricks were used to fill unnecessary openings. This reduced construction costs and saved materials. Additionally, the high air content between the particles in this mixture allows it to function as a 'heat accumulator', with lower heat dissipation compared to bricks. According to the architect's own calculations, his proposed design reduced brick consumption by almost half compared to conventional masonry with the same load-bearing capacity. Additionally, Melnikov's masonry system ensured even stress distribution throughout the wall and eliminated the need for load-bearing pillars and lintels.

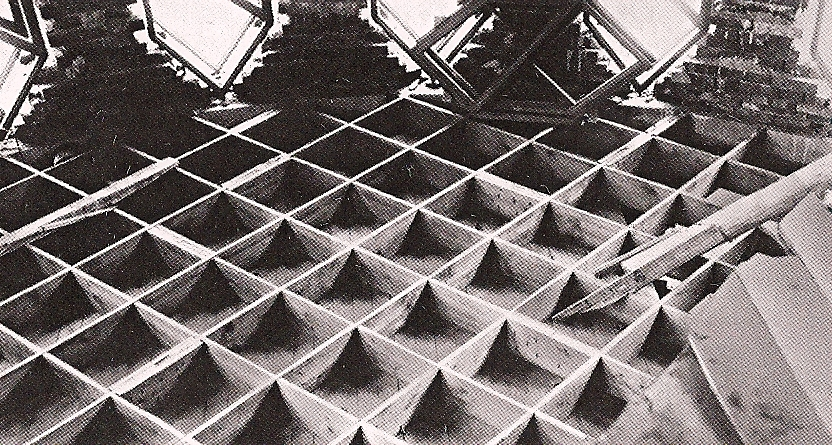
Membrane structure of the inter-storey shell, 1929

The inter-storey shells were also uniquely constructed using wooden batten placed on a rib. When Melnikov built his own house, he had already successfully constructed innovative wooden structures. Examples of these structures include the 'Mahorka' pavilion at the first All-Russian Agricultural and Craft-Industrial Exhibition of 1923 in Moscow, the USSR Pavilion for the 1925 World Fair in Paris, and wooden trade pavilions and the office building of the Novo-Sukharevsky market.

"Our lack of means was replaced by an abundance of architectural imagination," wrote K. Melnikov, "independent feeling destroyed any dependence on caution; the intimacy of the theme opened up grandiose perspectives of life's unsolved problems; indeed real economy made the nine-metre span as dangerous and no less new as the hulk of Santa Maria del Fiore".

The inter-storey shells are constructed using a grid of 0.5x0.5-metre square cells formed by crossing the floor planks at right angles. A wooden deck made of tongue-and-groove boards is then placed diagonally over the grid from above and below. This design eliminates the need for columns, rafters, and beams, allowing the shell to function structurally as a single membrane plate. The shell offers structural reliability even when sagging due to gravity. For instance, in the architect's studio, the ceiling had sagged over time. However, during renovation, Melnikov chose not to straighten it, explaining that the lenticular ceiling reflects light better by directing it downward.

== Volume-planning composition ==
=== Architectural solution ===
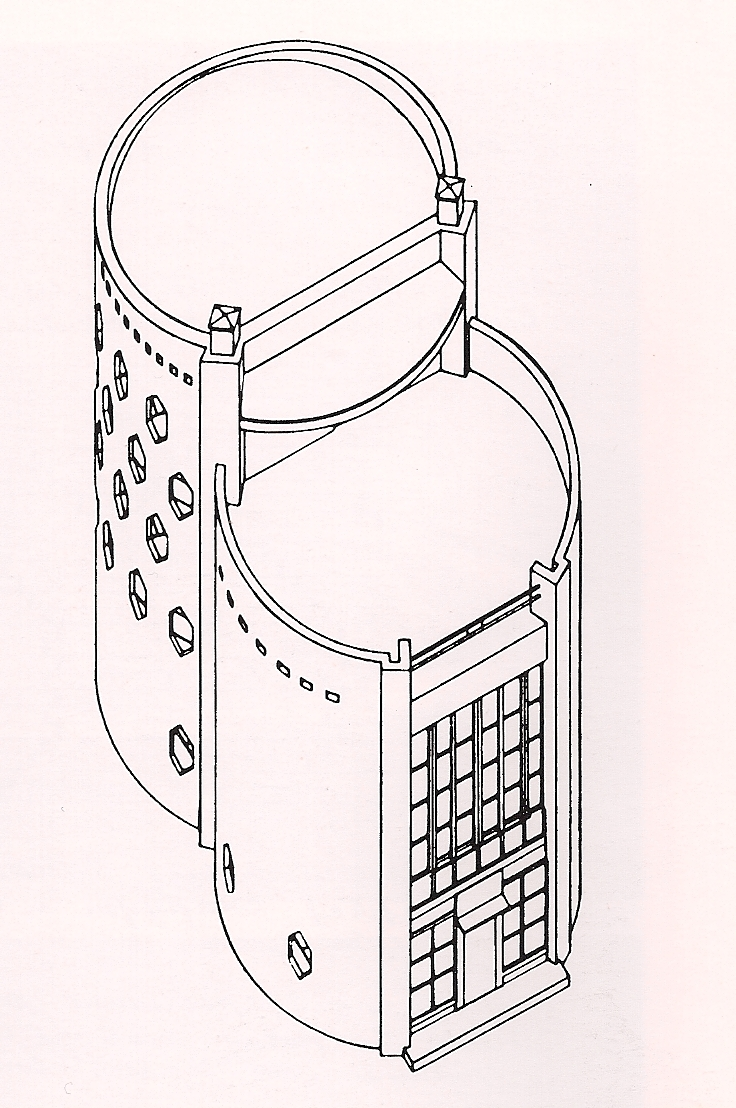
The workshop house plan. Axonometry, 1927–1929

The house is composed of two vertical cylinders of the same diameter but different heights, intersecting each other by one third of the radius. This creates a unique '8' shaped plan, oriented in a north-south direction. The lower cylinder has a vertical cut on its southern part and is topped by a flat roof with an open terrace. The cylinder at the rear has a sloping roof that descends from the centre of the building towards its northern part.

In the lecture notes at the Department of Architecture of the Military Engineering Academy, where Konstantin Melnikov once taught, the architect explains the benefits of cylindrical construction in detail:

"Saving Materials:

A direct link between the architectural study of geometry and economic impact. The objective is that... the floor area should be surrounded by a minimum perimeter of walls. The required area is, say, 1600 m². The height is a constant...

Let's take a parallelepiped, a cube and a cylinder....

So, for the three options, the perimeter is 200, 160 and 140 metres respectively. This is a very real saving from the shape of the volume".

The workshop house's main facade, facing Krivoarbatsky Lane, has a strictly symmetrical composition. The only entrance to the house is located in the center of the cut part of the small cylinder, flanked by two large rectangular windows. The main plane of the building's facade is occupied by a huge window-screen that stretches to the entire height of the second floor. Above the window, there is an inscription in relief letters on concrete that reads: "KONSTANTIN MELNIKOV ARCHITECTOR".

"Not to contradict or conform to the way of life that created a common uniform life for all," wrote K.S. Melnikov, "in 1927 I personally designed a house for myself in the centre of Moscow with the inscription 'KONSTANTIN MELNIKOV ARCHITECTOR', insistently announcing the high importance of each of us."

The front cylinder's side walls are almost entirely blank, with only a few hexagonal windows on the first floor and a single octagonal window on the west side at the first-floor level.

The facades of the northern cylinder at the rear are more freely designed. They feature 57 hexagonal vertical windows that form a single ornament with a peculiar rhythm of repeating elements arranged in five tiers. The lower row of windows is separated by a higher section of blank wall from the four upper ones. The second tier corresponds to the second floor, while the three upper tiers correspond to the third. The northern facade's overall composition is dynamically influenced by an unusual pattern of window bindings. These bindings are of three types: one in the windows of the first tier, one in the second and fourth tiers, and one in the third and fifth tiers of windows.

Volumetric composition of the house, 2021
North-eastern facade	North-western facade	Main facade

Individual architectural elements, 2021
Front door	Pattern of the hexagonal window on the first floor of the northern cylinder	Windows on the west side of the smaller cylinder. Upper window, the only octagonal window in the house.

Attributing the building of the Soviet avant-garde era to a particular architectural style is difficult due to its diverse features. The workshop house designed by Melnikov is often mistakenly characterized as a constructivist or functionalist building, as pointed out by the staff of the Museum of Architecture. However, despite some external similarities, Melnikov's work was not aligned with the architectural trends of the time. He strongly objected to his buildings being attributed to these styles:

"In our age of the emergence of constructivism, Rationalism, Functionalism, ARCHITECTURE seized to exist...," wrote K. Melnikov, "As for me, I knew different, and this different is not just constructivism. I love personality, respect personality and revel in personality. I considered every dogma in my work an enemy, however, all constructivists in general did not reach that acuteness of constructive possibilities, which I foresaw for 100 years".

=== Layout and interior design ===
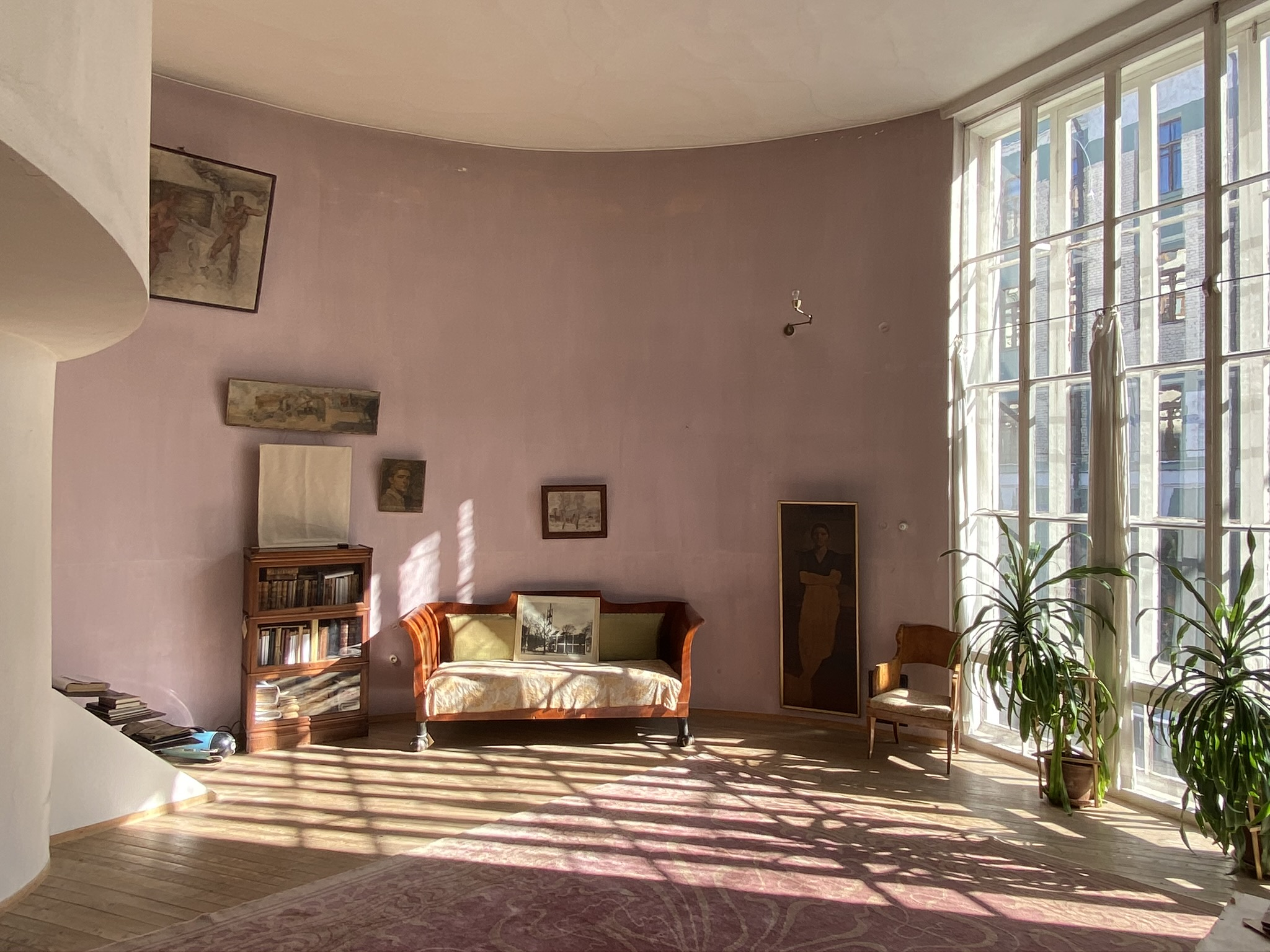

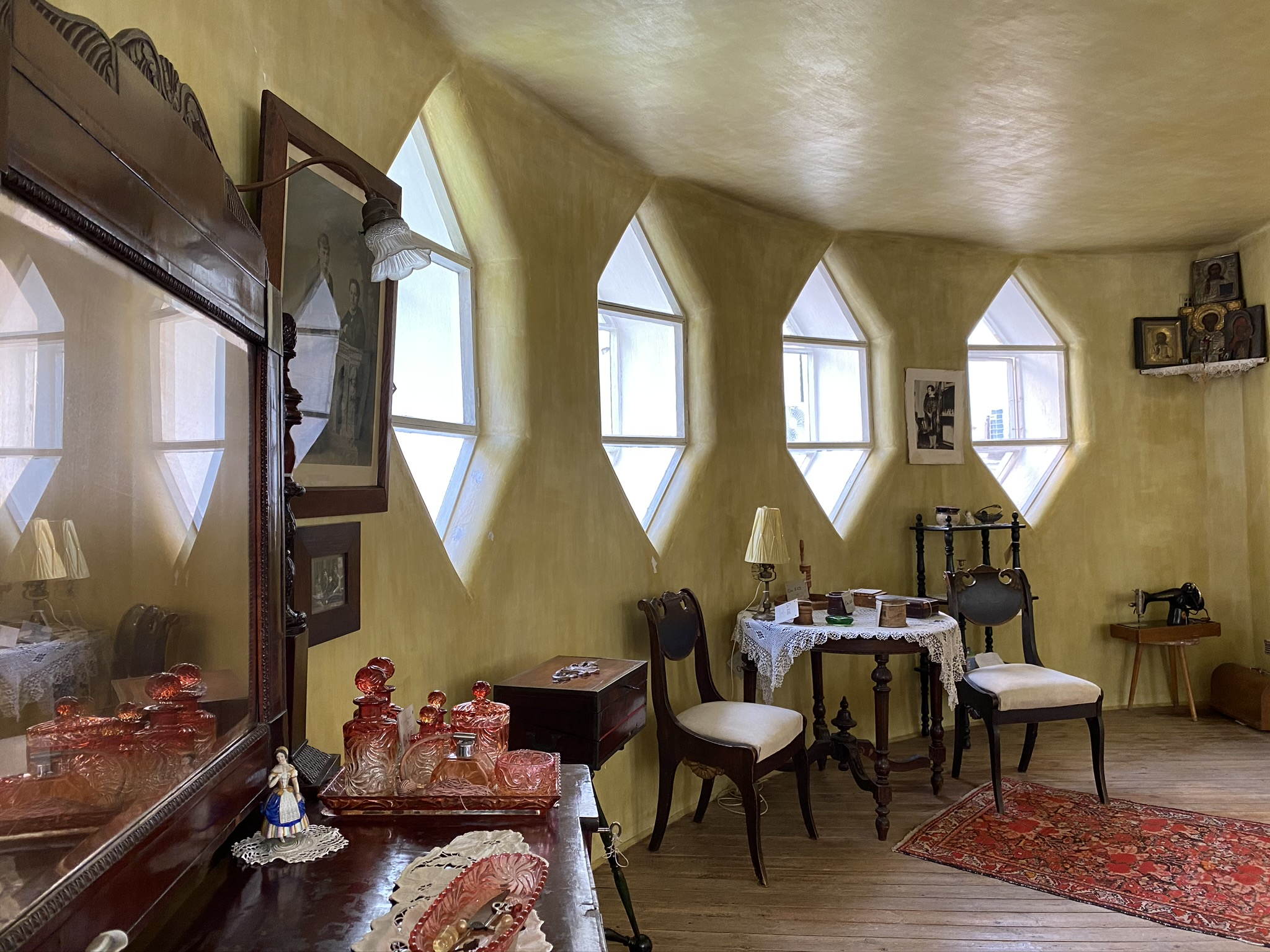

The mansion is situated on a rectangular plot of approximately 840 square metres, which extends deep into the neighbourhood. The shorter side of the plot faces Krivoarbatsky Lane and measures approximately 18 metres, while the longer side measures approximately 43 metres. The house is set back from the red line of the lane, dividing the plot into two unequal parts. In the front, smaller part, there is a front yard with two birch trees and a bilberry tree, which were planted by the architect. The plot is separated from Krivoarbatsky Lane by a wooden fence with two blind gates on the edges and a wicket gate in the centre. The wicket gate was connected to the house by an aerial telephone in the form of a metal pipe. The telephone line ran underground and then through the basement, connecting to the first floor of the house. The underground section has been preserved, although it was lost during Melnikov's lifetime. Near the cricket pitch, there is a sector-shaped area that deepens into the plot. It has a canopy that provides shelter from the weather for visitors waiting to be let inside. In the northern part of the plot behind the house, the Melnikov family constructed an open area for tournaments and volleyball games, as well as a bench and a table that overlook the courtyard facade of the house. They also built a barn, a vegetable garden, and planted fruit trees.

Despite the building's unusual and difficult-to-organise spatial structure, its internal layout is distinguished by exceptional functional thoughtfulness. Melnikov himself said:

"I will give a prize to the one who can accurately count how many floors are in the house, and to my brother-architect – a riddle: how did we achieve such a diverse range of volumes from a single standard form, which formed the organic essence of the architecture of our house"

Internal layout
1. front room 2. dining room 3. kitchen 4. corridor 5. sanitary unit 6. workroom of the landlady 7. workrooms of the children 8. workrooms of the children 9. cloakroom (dressing room); 10. living room 11. bedroom 12. workshop 13. open terrace

The family's daily activities occurred on the first floor of the workshop house, which was divided into the following rooms:

- The front room (6.3 m^{2}) is accessed through the centre of the street-facing facade. The original internal glass door serves two purposes: it can close off the front room to unite the corridor with the staircase to the second floor, or close off the entrance to the corridor, effectively extending the space of the front room.
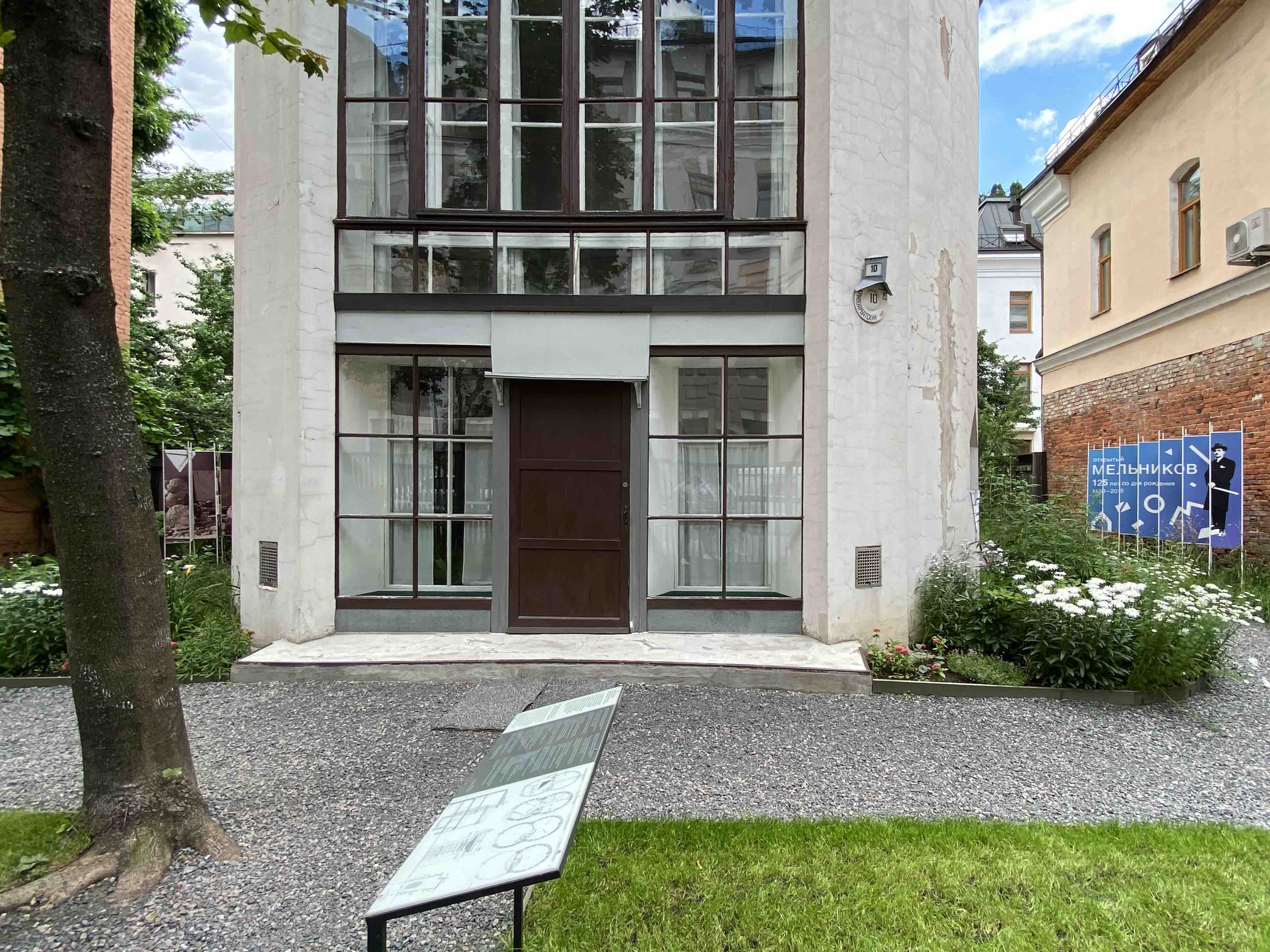
  The entrance. To the left of the entrance is the dining room window, to the right is the front room window. July 2020
- The dining room (17 m^{2}) is the main room on the first floor, where the family gathered, dined and received guests. It is lit by one hexagonal opening and a large rectangular window to the left of the entrance to the house.
- The kitchen (7 m^{2}) is located next to the dining room. One of the hexagonal openings in the outer wall on the kitchen side has been converted into a refrigerated cupboard, while a cupboard has been installed in place of the original opening between the kitchen and the dining room. The kitchen is illuminated by two hexagonal windows, in front of which is the working area consisting of a gas stove and a long table with containers for food and utensils. There was originally a kitchen oven next to the hob. Above the stove is a glass extractor screen, which is unusual for the 1920s. This screen allows air to be extracted from the cooker through ventilation, which was particularly important as the kitchen did not have a lockable door.
- The sanitary unit, consisting of a bathroom and a toilet (7 m^{2}), is adjacent to the kitchen and has a common communication with it. The bathroom has a hexagonal window and a gas heater.
- Two children's workrooms of the same size (5.6 m^{2}) for the architect's son and daughter. Each room has a hexagonal window and is equipped with study furniture: desks, shelves for books and textbooks have been placed near the window by the partition. On the whitewashed ceiling of these rooms are coloured triangles: yellow for the daughter and blue for the son.
- Cloakroom (dressing room) (14.2 m^{2}). There are built-in cupboards along the walls of the dressing room: to the right of the door is a white-painted women's cupboard (for mother and daughter), and to the left is a yellow-painted men's cupboard (for father and son). The clothes of all the family members were kept in this room. This was where the Melnikovs changed before going out and before going to bed – it was customary to go upstairs to the bedroom in pyjamas or dressing gowns. In the dressing room there was a sofa, a dressing table and a large trundle.
- The workroom of the landlady, Anna Gavrilovna Melnikova (6.5 m^{2}). There was a cupboard for laundry, a place for ironing and a sewing machine.
- The corridor (13.7 m^{2}) connects the kitchen, dining room, and toilet room not with doors, but with openings going all the way up to the ceiling (the first floor height is 2.65–2.7 metres). The corridor leads to the basement, which is located only under the first cylinder. During construction, two brick walls of buildings that once stood on the site were discovered and incorporated into the basement. The corridor wall features two openings for an aerial telephone and an intercom. These are used to communicate with the workshop on the 3rd floor and visitors at the entrance by the gate.

The house has a basement with a calorifer chamber (14.6 m^{2}) that distributes warm air through ducts to all rooms. The recirculating air heating system was designed by the architect himself. The original heating source was a fire heater, also designed by Konstantin Melnikov, which existed until the end of the 1950s. The firebox of the calorifier was connected to the kitchen by a channel for disposing of burnable waste. Additionally, the basement includes a workbench for the homeowner and a storage area for food.

The cylinder facing Krivoarbatsky pereulok has one floor above the first floor, while the other cylinder has two floors. A staircase over 1 metre wide leads to the second floor from the front. The staircase begins with a straight march and then continues into a narrow spiral staircase that ends on the third floor.

One the second floor, there are:

- The front room of the house was the living room (50 m^{2}), where the Melnikovs received guests and engaged in conversation. The furnishings, including a piano, sofa, armchair, and round table, were carefully chosen to reflect the room's purpose. After the war, Melnikov began using the room as a working office and a large desk, that belonged to a painter Viktor Melnikov, was added. The living room is illuminated by a large window-screen. In addition to the main window, the room features a small octagonal window on the west wall, which adds to the room's sense of scale. Originally, this window was not planned, but during construction, Melnikov noticed that it provided a clear view of the Church of St Nicholas the Wonderworker in Plotniki (which was unfortunately destroyed in 1932). Additionally, at sunset, a ray of sunlight enters the living room through this window. As a result, the window was left in place and given an octagonal shape, making it the only one of its kind in the house.
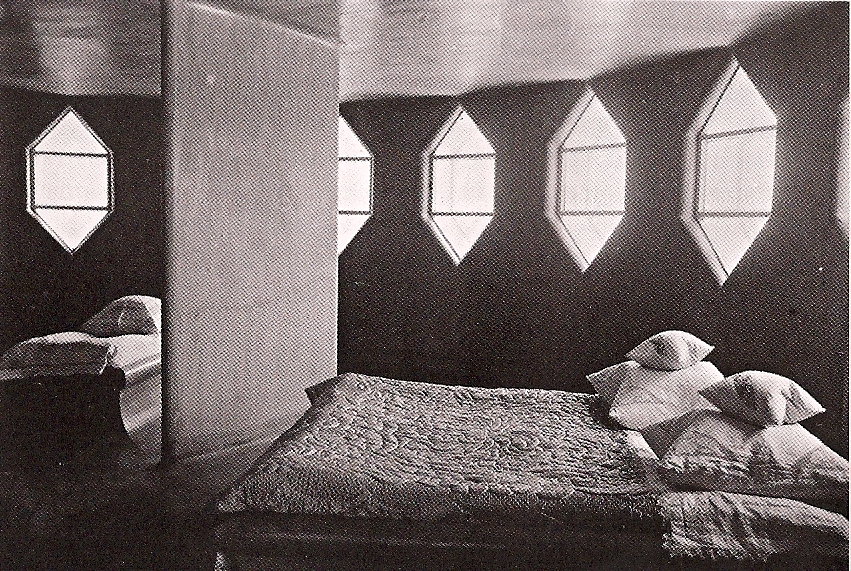
  The bedroom, 1930s
- The bedroom (43 m^{2}) was located on the second floor of the northern cylinder and was designed solely for sleeping. Melnikov placed special importance on the role of sleep in human life:

"And now if I hear that we need nutrition for our health, I say, 'No, we need sleep.' Everybody says rest needs air, not the right thing again – I believe that without sleep, air is powerless to restore our strength.".

The bedroom in Melnikov's house was shared by all members of the family. It contained no wardrobes or other furniture, except for three beds built into the floor: a double bed for the parents and single beds for the son and daughter. The pedestal beds, which grew out of the floor and were part of the seamless interior with rounded corners, were made of plastered boards and finished with a golden material on top. The bed of the parents was visually separated from those of the children by two partition screens arranged radially. The screens were not touching each other and did not reach the outer walls.

"I used the principle of distribution of living quarters not in relation to the members of the family personally, – said Melnikov, – but according to the functions of these living quarters. So, for example, there is only one bedroom and it functions solely as a bedroom, which ensures the best possible hygiene"

The bedroom is illuminated by 12 hexagonal windows overlooking the garden, with no ceiling lights present. The entire room is finished with a single copper-gold material, including the walls, ceiling, and built-in beds. Melnikov described the room as having a sense of "visible air". The bedroom suffered significant damage during the war, resulting in the loss of the pedestal beds and floor finishes. In the post-war renovation, wallpaper was applied to the walls and the room was repurposed as the personal space of the architect's wife.

The entire third floor was occupied by Melnikov's workshop (50 m^{2}), where he worked. Later, his son Viktor Melnikov took over the workshop on the third floor to pursue his career as a painter, while the living room was converted into K. S. Melnikov's office. The workshop and drawing room are nearly identical in terms of area and height. However, visitors perceive them in completely different ways. The drawing room has a single, large window, while the workshop is illuminated by 38 hexagonal windows that form a complex ornamental pattern. Additionally, the drawing room has a glazed door leading to the south-facing terrace. The workshop's lighting method created an unusual appearance and provided optimal lighting conditions for the architect's workplace. The light came from all sides, preventing the hand from shading the drawing.

The small cylinder's projection creates a mezzanine in the studio. Konstantin Melnikov enjoyed using this space to view sketches, drawings, and paintings laid out on the floor. The mezzanine balcony provides access to a terrace enclosed by a blind parapet. The roof is ribbed and covered with iron, with a lattice wooden deck on top. Water flows through evenly spaced openings into gutters and is discharged into downpipes fixed at the joints of the cylinders. A canopy extends over a portion of the terrace, which is a continuation of the round roof of the northern cylinder. During the summer, the Melnikovs enjoyed drinking tea on the terrace, relaxing in the fresh air, and using it for indoor tanning.

=== Critique ===
Contemporaries had mixed opinions on the architectural solution of the workshop house. In 1929, as the construction was nearing completion, the magazine 'Construction of Moscow' began a discussion on the topic. The first article, written by renowned architectural critic Nikolay Lukhmanov, praised Melnikov's project. In a subsequent publication, the editorial board featured additional responses from engineers and architects regarding the building. However, the assessments provided were ambiguous, as indicated by the titles of the articles: 'Experience should attract attention', 'Unprincipled experiment', and 'Unsuccessful constructions'.

In the early 1930s, members of the VOPRA (All-Russian Society (later the All-Union Association) of Proletarian Architects) made the most critical statements about the workshop house. They condemned Melnikov's formal solutions and found hostile class features in this small building. Architect A. Mikhailov, one of the ideologists of VOPRA, wrote:

In pursuit of eccentric construction, of the novelty of forms, Melnikov built a house... Melnikov's experiment is aimed only at improving, at an original interpretation of the architectural expression of a certain form – a residential bourgeois cell.... And in terms of artistic expression Melnikov did not give anything positive, as his operation with omnidirectional cylinders is a game of "pure" constructions, ideologically emasculated and thus pushing towards formalist-aesthetic contemplation.

Another renowned architect of that era, who was an active member of the OSA Group and one of the leading architectural critics of the 1930s–1950s, Roman Khiger, evaluated Melnikov's house as follows:

...spiral staircases, complex and awkward layout – could not, of course, in any way solve the problems of mass architecture of housing, but satisfied the sophisticated architectural taste of its owner, who was also prone to constructive experiments and puzzles.

From the mid-1930s until the mid-1950s, there was a critical assessment of the workshop house due to the transition of Soviet architecture from avant-garde ideas to neoclassical stylisations, known as Stalin's Empire style. This shift led to the replacement of vigorous discussion and contradictory statements.

== Current condition of the monument ==
=== Restructuring and losses ===
The bedroom built into the floor lost its beds, as well as the original wall and ceiling finishes during the Great Patriotic War. On 23 July 1941, a bombing raid hit the nearby Vakhtangov Theatre, causing the blast wave to knock out some of the glass in the windows of the rear (northern) cylinder of the Melnikov House. The original was only parially preserved.

In the late 1940s, while Victor Melnikov's family lived in the house, they removed two partitions on the first floor. One partition separated the two former children's study rooms, while the other separated the toilet (cloakroom) room and A.G. Melnikova's workroom. Consequently, the four small rooms were converted into two bedrooms – one for Victor's daughters and the other for him and his wife, Irina.

During the early 1950s, a separate entrance to the house was installed for Viktor Melnikov's family. This entrance was placed in the kitchen where the built-in refrigerator cupboard used to be. The original layout of the first floor and the refrigerator cupboard in the kitchen were restored during the 1990s.

During the 1976 renovation of the building, the facades were painted with light grey paint, which concealed the natural white colour of the quicklime that originally covered them. Additionally, the wooden fence with a wicket was rebuilt with some deviations from the original design.

=== Technical condition ===
Poorly executed repair and restoration work in the mid-1990s caused many cracks and damaged the unique membrane inter-storey shells. Despite requests from the building's residents and letters to various authorities, the restorers' mistakes and shortcomings were not rectified, and the work was accepted by the Moscow Department of Monuments Protection with an 'excellent' rating.

In the 1990s – 2014, intensive construction work was carried out around the architectural monument, which resulted in the deterioration of the building's insulation and the loss of the historic view from the workshop to the Transfiguration of the Saviour Church on Pesky.

The condition of the exterior walls in the 2010s was characterised by surface cracks in the plaster layers, but no penetrations, and partial loss of paint layers. The window sashes of the southern cylinder had rotted in the lower part due to the growth of a maple tree in the 2000s. In the early 2010s, there was great concern about the possible subsidence of the Melnikov House due to changes in the hydrogeological situation.

On 17 April 2006, the international conference 'Heritage at Risk – Preservation of 20th Century Architecture and World Heritage' passed a resolution requesting the Ministry of Culture and Mass Communications of the Russian Federation and the Cultural Heritage Committee of Moscow to acknowledge that the outstanding heritage of Konstantin Melnikov was at risk. They were also asked to develop a plan for the conservation of the Melnikov House and its collection within the existing international standards for restoration work. Additionally, they were requested to ensure that the Melnikov House and its collection are included in the list of monuments of federal significance. The Melnikov House was included in the World Monuments Watch List of 100 most endangered sites.

=== Restoration by the Museum of Architecture ===
The Melnikov Museum was established in 2014, which led to increased efforts to restore the house. In December of that year, restorers hired by the museum inspected and cleaned the historic air heating ducts. In February 2015, the museum signed a memorandum with Arup, an international engineering and design company, to conduct a comprehensive survey of the Melnikov House. In 2019, Arup specialists prepared a report and work programme to study the structures of the house, including its foundations and bases, as well as the geological and hydrogeological conditions of the adjacent site.

The programme was implemented between 2017 and 2019 as part of a large-scale scientific survey of the first ever Melnikov House. The survey was funded by a donation from PIK Group (Russia) and a grant from the Getty Foundation (USA) as part of the Keeping It Modern initiative to preserve 20th century monuments. The in-depth engineering survey of the building and the adjacent site was a crucial stage that determined all subsequent long-term conservation and restoration measures for the monument. The pre-restoration survey was an international project led by Pavel Kuznetsov, the director of the Konstantin and Viktor Melnikov State Museum. Tapani Mustonen, an architect-restorer from Finland and a member of the executive board of Europa Nostra, served as the main international expert. Mustonen was previously involved in the conservation of the modernist monument, the Vyborg Library. Tatiana Tsareva, a Russian expert, was responsible for documentary and archival research of the Melnikov House. Mariel Polman and Luc Megens, experts from the Cultural Heritage Agency (Netherlands), participated in the project to survey the colours and colouring of the interiors.

PIK provided funding for geological, hydrogeological, and geodetic surveys of the Melnikov House site. The Getty Foundation grant was used to survey all foundations, structures, building and finishing materials, architectural colours, interior colours, and engineering networks, including the original air heating system and 'air telephone', as well as other elements of the building. The results of the pre-restoration survey of the Melnikov House are available to the public on the website of the Shchusev Museum of Architecture and in the Getty Foundation's online library in English.

Based on the survey results, the walls, pillars, and internal partitions of the building are in serviceable condition. However, the facade finish is unsatisfactory and requires restoration of plaster and paint layers, as well as emergency repairs to the stained glass window on the southern facade. The under-roof structures of both cylinders, internal staircases, and inter-storey shells are also in limited serviceable condition.

In 2017, the Museum of Architecture established the International Advisory Committee for the Preservation of the Melnikov House (ISC), headed by architectural historian Professor Jean-Louis Cohen (France), to ensure transparency in the restoration process. In January 2020, the ISC held a meeting at the Shchusev Museum of Architecture in Moscow to discuss the survey results of the house and the next steps in its restoration. The survey results were deemed comprehensive and sufficient for an objective assessment of the monument's condition and decision-making on necessary works. The Museum of Architecture was recommended to proceed to the next stage, which involves developing a detailed conservation project with the involvement of Russian and international specialists who participated in the survey of the building.

According to the ISC, the priorities in the conservation of the Melnikov House should be: minimal intervention ("exactly as much as necessary, and no more") in the conservation of the Melnikov House, preserving rather than restoring or recreating with potential loss of authenticity. It is important to maintain authenticity in materials, finishes, methods, and design. Given that the building's structures pose no immediate risks and with proper operating conditions, monitoring, and timely maintenance repairs, it has limited suitability for use as a museum display and for organizing excursions with strict restrictions on the number and total weight of visitors.

The preservation of the Melnikov House depends on maintaining the appropriate temperature and humidity levels in both the interiors and structures. To ensure the safe use of the building, it is important to follow recommended organizational measures such as limiting the number of visitors and avoiding overloading the roof with snow during the winter season. It is stated that there are currently no hydrogeological risks to the building resulting from the active construction in the 1990s–2000s. However, it is recommended to continue monitoring the building's hydrogeology and geodetics.

Except for the works on the building facades, which require total renovation, all other planned conservation measures are assumed to be localized. The list of these measures is as follows:

List of measures
- a) full restoration of the facades:
  - removal of 1990s paintwork and cement render from recent repairs;
  - repair of small sections of masonry;
  - conservation of wooden planks and filling of hexagonal openings behind the render;
  - conservation of part of the external window frames and the entrance group;
- b) conservation of the lower support beam of the stained glass window in the living room on the second floor;
- c) repair of weakened inter-storey membrane shells over the first floor in the bedroom and partially over the first floor in the workshop;
- d) fragmentary repair of the roof and attic ceilings of the large cylinder, the guttering system, restoration of the terrace flooring of the small cylinder in accordance with the architect's design;
- e) conservation and reinforcement of the finishing materials (plaster layers and colouring) inside the building;
- f) selective repair of staircase elements (steps, handrails) and floors on all floors;
- g) normalisation of the temperature and humidity regime by installing a system to control and regulate the temperature of the heat carrier when it is supplied from the central heating system to the building. It is recommended to consider the possibility of humidifying warm air directly at the heating source instead of using museum-type air humidifiers currently in use. This can be achieved by installing a water tank with a large evaporation surface in the calorifier chamber. To regulate and monitor the formation of condensation on the windows, it is necessary to rely on the readings of the humidity control system, as the use of insulating materials is not an option.
- h) fire protection measures, including installation of a modern fire alarm system and treatment of wood with fire-bio-protective compounds;
- i) the geotechnical survey of the site did not reveal any serious problems in the area adjacent to the Melnikov House, including groundwater. Along with the continuation of geodetic monitoring of the building's precipitation, it is necessary to continue regular monitoring of the dynamics of the upper groundwater horizon, located at a depth of about 8 metres;
- j) it is recommended that the design be modified to reduce the width of the clay screen (paving) around the perimeter of the building. This will increase the reliability of rainfall drainage;
- k) the need to reduce pressure on this small cultural heritage site (house and garden) by relocating the infrastructure necessary for the convenience of visitors (cloakroom, toilet facilities, information and educational spaces, etc.) to neighbouring buildings should be considered early on, taking into account the growing interest of visitors.

Despite the start of design and restoration work being delayed due to the search for funding and the COVID-19 pandemic, in March 2021, the Museum of Architecture publicly announced the start of restoration work on the Melnikov House, naming LSR Group PJSC as the museum's general partner for its preservation. LSR Group has pledged to donate funds for the four-year restoration period. In 2021, they are expected to prepare a restoration project for the monument. The general designer is the Rozhdestvenka architectural bureau, which previously took part in the survey of the House. They were also responsible for the restoration of the historic fence of the house in 2015 and the garden shed in 2019. Based on the project, all necessary restoration works are expected to be carried out between 2022 and 2024. The LSR Group named a street in Melnikov's honour within its flagship Moscow residential complex ZILART.

According to Pavel Kuznetsov, Director of the Melnikov Museum, the priority when developing restoration measures is to maximise the preservation of authentic materials and original architectural and engineering solutions from the 1920s. Elizaveta Likhacheva, Director of the Museum of Architecture, stated that they are taking their time with the restoration process. The method they are using is called 'open restoration', which involves closing off parts of the house and garden to visitors while leaving the rest accessible. The goal is to create a model for preserving 20th century architectural monuments.

The aim of the extensive restoration is to ensure the long-term preservation of the Melnikov House for use as a museum exhibit. Additionally, a nomination dossier will be prepared for the building's inscription on the UNESCO List of World Heritage Sites. This will include formulating and justifying the site's World Universal Value. In February 2019, the Council of the Russian National Committee of ICOMOS (International Council on Monuments and Sites) supported the initiative of the Museum of Architecture to include the Melnikov House in the List of World Heritage Sites.

=== Legal situation ===
Konstantin Melnikov left his house to his children, Viktor and Lyudmila. After their father's and mother's deaths (in 1974 and 1977, respectively), Viktor Melnikov continued to reside in the house. In 1988, Lyudmila demanded that the house be divided so that she could also live in it. Viktor refused, and Lyudmila subsequently sued him. The legal dispute between the siblings lasted for eight years. In the end, the Moscow City Court awarded Lyudmila 50% ownership of the workshop house, but without the right to reside in it.

In 2003, Victor Melnikov donated his share of the house to his daughter, Elena. However, in early 2005, Victor suspected Elena of fraudulently forcing him to sign the donation. In the presence of the press and representatives of the architectural community, Victor Melnikov stated that he excluded Elena from his will. He appointed his eldest daughter, Ekaterina Karinskaya, as the executor of his will. However, in March 2005, he announced that he would bequeath the house, his father's entire collection, and his own works to the state, disinheriting both daughters. A lawsuit was filed by Viktor Melnikov's daughter, Yelena, to contest the will. In September, Victor Melnikov won the case, and on 13 December 2005, the court decision became legally binding. Following her father's death, Elena Melnikova filed for a judicial review against the decision with the Presidium of the Moscow City Court. However, during a court hearing on 16 March 2006, Elena decided not to pursue further legal action regarding the ownership of the house. Instead, she expressed her support for the creation of a state museum in the house.

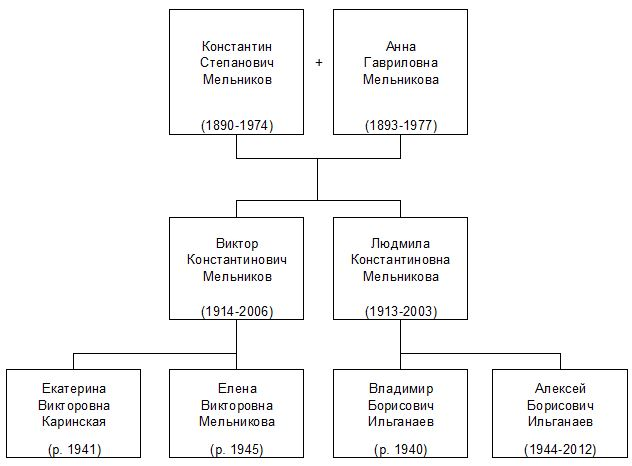
The Melnikov family

The late Lyudmila (died in 2003), daughter of Konstantin Melnikov, bequeathed her 50% share in the property to her younger son, Alexey Borisovich Ilganaev. A few days after Victor Melnikov's death, it was revealed that Ilganaev had sold his stake to Sergei Gordeev, who was a senator of the Federation Council from the Perm region at the time. Gordeev is the president and largest shareholder of PIK Group (one of the largest construction and development companies in Russia) as of 2021. In December 2010, Gordeev donated the aforementioned share to the Russian Federation with the intention of transferring it to the Shchusev Museum of Architecture.

The longstanding legal battle over the ownership of the building ended in March 2017.

Viktor Melnikov's inheritance file includes a house with memorial furnishings, as well as his and his father's creative archives. Despite Viktor Melnikov specifying only one heir, the Russian Federation, in his will, both of his daughters, Ekaterina Karinskaya and Elena Melnikova, are legally entitled to a compulsory share in the inheritance.

As of March 2021, three-quarters of the house title belongs to the Russian Federation, which includes Ludmila's share and half of Victor's share. Additionally, Victor Melnikov's two daughters have each registered one-eighth of the house title as his compulsory heirs, who were not mentioned in the will. The Museum of Architecture has been responsible for preserving the house as a cultural heritage object and implementing restoration measures since October 2013, in accordance with monument protection legislation. This is due to the Department of Cultural Heritage of the City of Moscow issuing a protective obligation to the museum as the user of the monument. In December 2013, the court determined that the monument, which is jointly owned by the heirs of Victor Melnikov, is not subject to division or allocation of property in kind under paragraph 2 of Article 54 of the Federal Law of the Russian Federation of 25 June 2002, No. 73-FZ.

The Melnikov House, along with the creative legacy of architect Konstantin Melnikov and artist Viktor Melnikov, is considered a single, indivisible entity of significant historical and cultural value, according to the decision of the Presnensky District Court of Moscow on 9 December 2013. Any attempt to divide this heritage would result in a disproportionate loss of a unique cultural object. The court ruled that compulsory heirs are entitled to compensation from the heir at will, the Russian Federation. An expert examination appointed by the court established the market value of the 1/4 share in the ownership right to the house as of 30 May 2016 at 66,521,750 rubles.

Between 2017 and 2019, the Russian Ministry of Culture sent multiple letters to the Russian Ministry of Finance and Rosimushchestvo requesting funds from the federal budget to purchase a ¼ share from the obligatory heirs, sisters Elena Melnikova and Ekaterina Karinskaya. Subsequently, in 2019–2020, the Museum of Architecture submitted applications to the Ministry of Culture of Russia to receive federal budget funds for the same purpose.

=== Threats to preservation ===
The Melnikov Experimental Residential Building was granted the status of a historical and cultural monument in 1987. According to Federal Law No. 73-FZ of 25 June 2002, 'On Objects of Cultural Heritage (Monuments of History and Culture) of the Peoples of the Russian Federation', the building is now considered aт object of cultural heritage of the peoples of Russia of regional significance in Russia. In March 2014, the monument's protection category was upgraded to an object of cultural heritage of federal significance based on the results of the state historical and cultural expertise conducted at the request of the Museum of Architecture, by order of the Government of the Russian Federation.

However, despite this status, Trust Oil was granted permission by Moscow Government Resolution No. 637-PP of 13 August 2002 to construct and reconstruct buildings with a total area of approximately 13.6 thousand m^{2}, as well as several levels of underground parking, within 100 metres of the Melnikov house wall. This permission was later confirmed by Moscow Government Resolution No. 152-PP of 13 March 2007. Although the Melnikov House was not within the construction impact zone, the developer was ordered to finance a survey of its technical condition and deformation monitoring of the unique building and the surrounding area throughout the construction period due to its cultural significance. In October–December 2012, the Gersevanov NIIOSP conducted a comprehensive survey of the structures of the Melnikov House, including the building's foundation, on behalf of Moskomnaslediya and at the expense of Trust Oil. The study revealed that the destruction of the Melnikov House was caused by a lack of maintenance and the inadequacy of structural solutions.

Studies have been conducted at different times to assess the engineering-geological and hydrogeological conditions of the Melnikov House site. However, the results have been contradictory.

LLC 'Rosecocenter' conducted a forecast to assess the impact of anthropogenic activity on hydrogeological conditions resulting from the proposed construction at 39–41 Arbat St. (north-eastern part of the territory from the Melnikov House). The survey indicates that the construction will cause a 0.1m decrease in the level of the alluvial aquifer. Thus, the construction will not cause waterlogging of the area. Permissible changes to the groundwater regime and balance are within the annual amplitude of groundwater level fluctuations.

In November 2006, specialists from Moscow State University of Civil Engineering conducted a survey of the structures and foundations of the Melnikov House. The report concluded that construction in the area of the architectural monument and the surrounding territory is unacceptable.

Based on the geotechnical and geophysical surveys conducted by SVZ LLC in 2008 at the site near the Melnikov House, no significant zones of soil decompaction were identified up to a depth of 60 metres.

According to the 'Schematic map of engineering-geological zoning of the territory of Moscow on the degree of danger of karst-suffosion processes', the location of Melnikov House is classified as a potentially dangerous area for karst-suffosion processes. Therefore, regular monitoring is required.

From August 2012 to January 2013, Gersevanov NIIOSP conducted monthly deformation monitoring of the Melnikov house. The reports documented the appearance of new cracks in the partitions and in the areas where walls and partitions meet the ceiling. According to the expert report, the defects observed are not related to the deformation of the foundations of the Melnikov House. Instead, they are caused by the ongoing deformation of the wooden inter-storey shells, which are in an unacceptable technical condition. Deformation monitoring of the Melnikov House was suspended in February 2013, as Melnikov's granddaughter, Ekaterina Karinskaya, refused to allow NIIOSP to enter the building of the architectural monument.

The survey conducted in 2017–2018 on the foundations and bases of the building, as well as geogical conditions, and hydrogeological situation of the adjacent plot did not reveal any risks to the house structures. Geodetic monitoring during this period indicated no negative phenomena, and there were no sedimentary deformations in the building. Regular observation of the upper groundwater horizon in 2019–2021, which is at a depth of about 7.5 m (the so-called headwater) and at foundation depths ranging from 1.4 m (south side of the building) to 3.0–3.5 m (north side of the building) and fed mainly by precipitation, also shows no negative dynamics.

== Establishment of the Melnikov Museum ==
Almost immediately after its completion, the house became the object of a sort of pilgrimage. Despite the building always being residential, it was visited by people of various professions in tour groups and individually, which was recorded in the Melnikov family archive. Artist and historian Igor Grabar, who visited Melnikov's house in 1933, left the following review:

"I never envy people, but as I left here, I caught myself feeling envious: I wish I could live like that."

The idea of creating a museum in Melnikov's house arose when the architect was still alive. In the last years of his life Konstantin Melnikov was ill, and this made him think more and more seriously about the fate of his house. In 1972 he approached the Architect Union with a request to create a museum in the house, but this proposal was not approved.

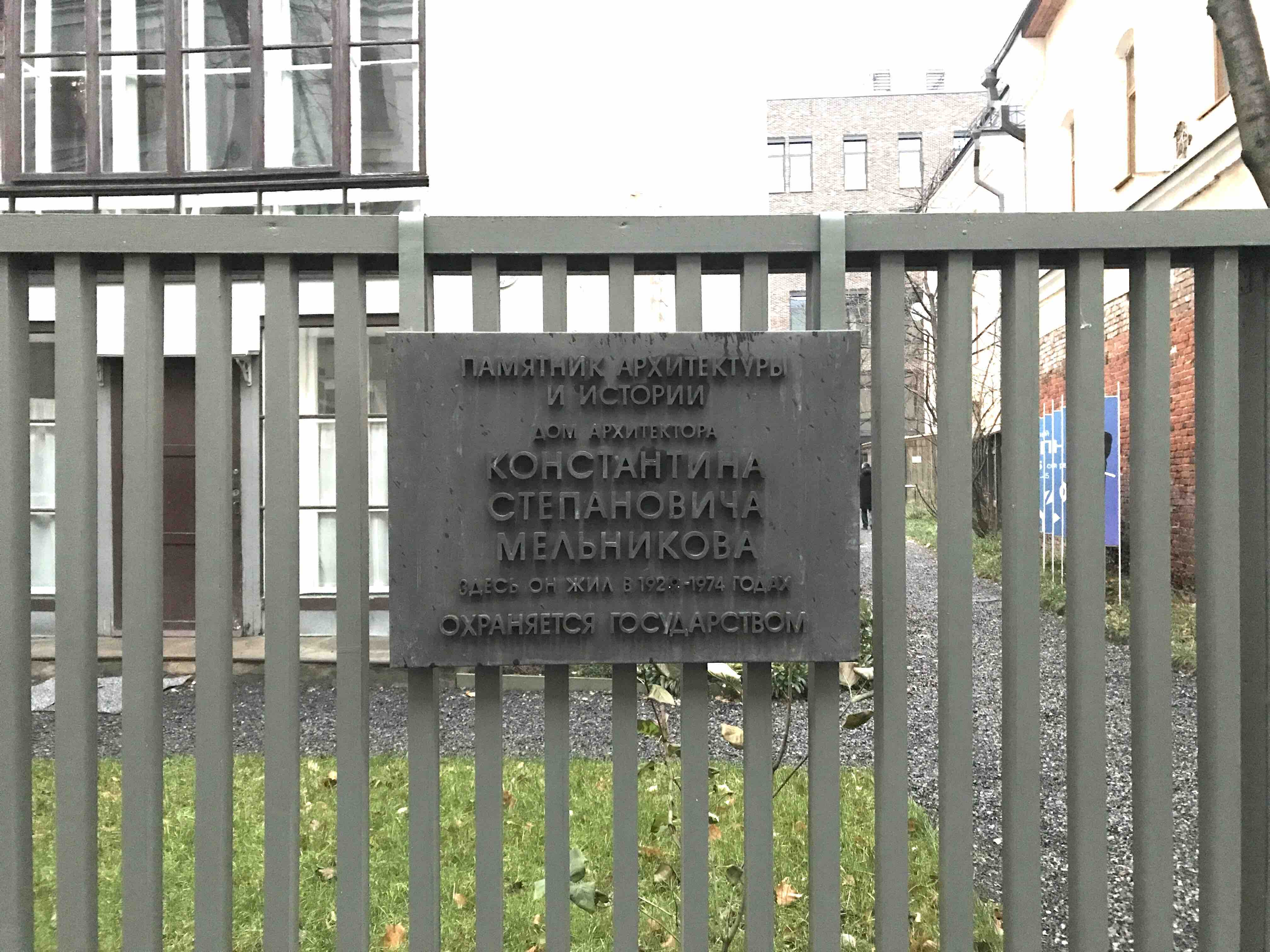
Commemorative plaque, November 2019

Viktor Melnikov, who became the owner of the house after his father's death in 1974, saw his task in turning the unique building into a museum. Following this intention, he did not sell a single work of Konstantin Melnikov during his lifetime. Viktor Melnikov and his sister, Lyudmila, personally provided excursions to the regular visitors, specialists, and foreign architecture students. In 1977, the famous Italian film director and screenwriter Michelangelo Antonioni visited Melnikov's house and left the following entry in the guestbook:

"This house, as a fruit of the architecture of the future, is beautiful. It needs restoration and conservation as a museum".

Since 1985, Viktor Melnikov had repeatedly raised the issue of establishing a museum in the Melnikov house. However, he made a number of certain demands: that he, Viktor Melnikov, who spent his entire life in the house, should be able to live in it. That the other heirs be provided with flats. That a study center of Melnikov's work, an archive for Melnikov Senior's projects and Melnikov Junior's paintings, as well as exhibition space be set up somewhere in the neighbourhood. Finally, the state should guarantee the preservation of the memorial furnishings of the house. Options for a branch of the Shchusev Museum of Architecture in the workshop house were also considered. However, the decision to create a museum in the Melnikov house was not made during the lifetime of the architect's children.

When in 2005, Viktor Melnikov bequeathed his share in the property to the Russian Federation, he also donated his artistic works to the state. However, he imposed a condition that a state Museum of Father and Son Melnikov be established. The bequest includes several other conditions, such as preserving the memorial atmosphere in the workshop house, organizing excursions for groups in a way that ensures the preservation of the architectural monument, considering the uniqueness and structural features of the monument and allocating additional premises near the Melnikov House for the storage and exhibition of works. It is important to consider the uniqueness and structural features of the monument.

=== Museification in the 21st century ===
In spring 2013, the Shchusev Museum of Architecture organised a competition to create a concept for the Melnikov Museum. The competition was won by the Citizenstudio bureau. The Konstantin and Viktor Melnikov State Museum (Melnikov Museum) was established by the Ministry of Culture of the Russian Federation in 2014 as a branch of the Shchusev Museum of Architecture. It is located on Vozdvizhenka Street, within walking distance of the Melnikov House.

Preparations for the museification of the House began in late October 2014. Since 3 December 2014, the Melnikov House has been open to visitors as the main exhibit of the museum. Visits are organized by appointment only, as part of an excursion group in test mode, allowing for only one excursion per day for a group of no more than five people.

The garden area around the house has been a year-round museum space open to the public free of charge since April 2014. In 2015, the street fence of the House, with an unusual semi-circular entrance group, was recreated based on the original design by Konstantin Melnikov.

In autumn 2015, the Melnikov Museum opened a street exhibition-installation called "Open Melnikov" in the garden. The following summer, a street model was installed on the premises, displaying the house structure in section. The museum reconstructed the garden paths, shrubs, and flower beds based on archival materials, photographs, paintings, and diaries of Konstantin Melnikov. Additionally, a memorial vegetable garden was recreated, and garden furniture was installed for visitors. In 2019, a wooden garden shed was recreated on the historical site in its original dimensions and adapted to the needs of the museum shop, based on a joint project by the architectural bureaus "Alexander Brodsky" and "Rozhdestvenska". During the summer, the garden hosts lectures, master classes, and annual outdoor festive events to celebrate Konstantin Melnikov's birthday on 3 August.

Between 2014 and 2017, the Museum conducted an inventory of the memorial furnishings and archival contents of the house. The inventory revealed over 27 items, including Konstantin Melnikov's diary entries transcribed by Museum staff. Research work is conducted using the archives of the house, and the results are published in various forms. In 2017, P. Kuznetsov's book "Melnikov's House: A Masterpiece of Avant-Garde, a Residential House, an Architectural Museum" was published in collaboration with DOM Publishers (Berlin). In 2018, a performance titled "Melnikov. Documentary Opera" was created based on archival documents and diaries of the architect from the 1920s–1940s. It was nominated for the Golden Mask Theatre Award in the category of Best Experimental Performance a year later.

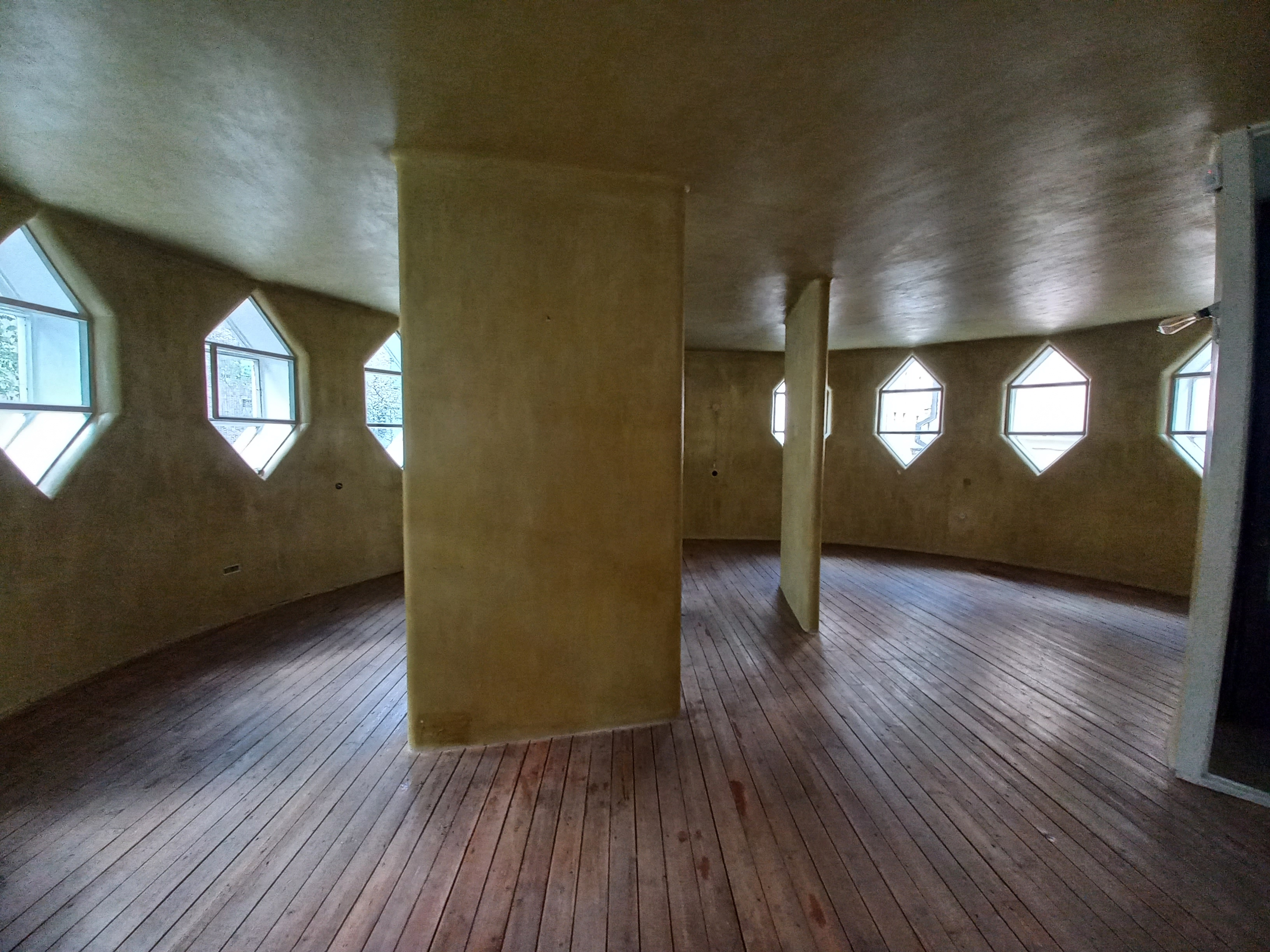
Empty Melnikov house is ready for the start of restoration works (June 2023)

The Melnikov Museum established connections with other residential houses – masterpieces of modernism abroad. In 2016, the museum signed an agreement with the Centre des monuments nationaux (France) to twin the Melnikov House with Villa Savoye, a masterpiece built by Le Corbusier. A year later, Villa Savoye hosted an exhibition dedicated to Konstantin Melnikov as part of the twinning of the two monuments.

In 2015, the Melnikov House was the first Russian building to be included in the Iconic Houses Network's list of approximately 150 unique 20th-century residential buildings. This inclusion increased the likelihood of receiving a grant from the Getty Foundation in 2017 for a pre-restoration survey of the building. The Melnikov House was introduced to European audiences during the annual Iconic Houses lecture tour in October 2019 in Norway, Germany, the Netherlands and the Czech Republic, and was the first participant in the Iconic Houses lecture tour in the United States and Canada in February 2020.

In March 2021, the museum publicised information about the forthcoming restoration and announced that the house would not be closed completely to the public during the work.

== The house in works of literature and art ==
"Two lovers of Krivoarbatsky.
Together in a double embrace.
Wrapped in a diamond-shaped cloak.
Unresponsive to insulting curses."
- wrote the poet Andrei Voznesensky about the house of architect Konstantin Melnikov in Krivoarbatsky lane.

- Alexander Rodchenko's photographic works depict Melnikov's house alongside its creator.

== Bibliography ==
=== In russian ===
- Хан-Магомедов, С.О. (1984). Кривоарбатский переулок, 10: Путеводитель. Биография московского дома. Moscow: Московский рабочий.
- Константин Степанович Мельников: Архитектура моей жизни. Творческая концепция. Творческая практика. Мир художника. Moscow: Искусство. 1985.
- Константин Мельников. Рисунки и проекты: Каталог выставки. Moscow: Советский художник. 1989. ISBN 978-5269001739.
- Мельников К. С. (2006). Архитекторское слово в его архитектуре. Мoscow: Архитектура-С. ISBN 5-9647-0091-8.
- Хан-Магомедов С. О. (2006). Константин Мельников. Moscow: Архитектура-С. ISBN 978-5-9647-0095-1.
- Хан-Магомедов С. О. (2006). Дом-мастерская архитектора Константина Мельникова. Moscow: Архитектура-С. ISBN 5-9647-0109-4.
- Гозак А. П. (2010). Дом Мельникова. Шедевры авангарда. Moscow: С. Э. Гордеев. ISBN 978-5-91566-046-4.
- Егор Егорычев (2012). Дом Мельниковых: Константина и Виктора. Moscow: Москва, которой нет.
- Архитектура Москвы 1910—1935 гг. Памятники архитектуры Москвы. Moscow: Искусство — XXI век. 2012. pp. 240–243. ISBN 978-5-98051-101-2.
- Кузнецов, П.В. (2017). Дом Мельникова. Шедевр авангарда, жилой дом, архитектурный музей. Теория и история; т. 60. Berlin, Moscow: DOM publishers, Shchusev Museum of Architecture. ISBN 978-3-86922-437-4.

=== In other languages ===
- De Magistris, Alessandro (1998). La casa cilindrica di Konstantin Melnikov: 1927—1929 (in Italian). Celid. ISBN 978-8876613340.
- Kuznetsov, Pavel (2017). The Melnikov House: Icon of the Avant-Garde, Family Home, Architecture Museum. The Basics series. Vol. 61. Berlin: DOM Publishers. ISBN 978-3-86922-436-7.
- MacEl; Otakar; Fosso; Mario (2001). Konstantin S. Mel'Nikov and the Construction of Moscow. Skira. ISBN 9788881185399.
- Pallasmaa, Juhani; Gozak, Andrei (1996). The Melnikov house. Moscow (1927—1929): Konstantin Melnikov. Academy Ed. ISBN 1-85490-413-2.
- Pare, Richard (2007). Die verlorene Avantgarde (in German). Schirmer/Mosel Verlag Gm. ISBN 978-3-8296-0299-0.
- Starr, S. Frederick (1978). Melnikov: Solo Architect in a Mass Society. Princeton: Princeton University Press. ISBN 0-691-03931-3.
