= Naum Yakovlevich Vilenkin =

Soviet mathematician (1920–1991)

Naum Yakovlevich Vilenkin (Russian: Наум Яковлевич Виленкин; October 30, 1920 – October 19, 1991) was a Soviet mathematician known for his work in the representation theory of Lie groups, the theory of special functions, harmonic analysis on topological groups, and combinatorics. He was also a well-known populariser of mathematics and the author of widely used school mathematics textbooks and books on recreational mathematics, including Stories about Sets and Combinatorics.

== Biography ==
Vilenkin was born on October 30, 1920, in Moscow into the family of an office worker. His parents were Yakov Vladimirovich Vilenkin (1886–1969) and Zinaida Sigismundovna Vilenkina (née Schwartz; 1894–1960). His younger brother, Sergei Yakovlevich Vilenkin (1923–1992), also became a noted scientist — a doctor of technical sciences who worked at the Institute of Control Sciences and taught at the Moscow Institute of Physics and Technology.

He studied at the 7th experimental school in Krivoarbatsky Lane in Moscow and graduated from Moscow State University in 1942, where he was a student of A. G. Kurosh. He received his degree of Doctor of Physical and Mathematical Sciences in 1950 and became a professor in 1951. From 1943 he worked at various higher-education institutions, and from 1961 at the Moscow Correspondence Pedagogical Institute (later part of the Sholokhov Moscow State University for the Humanities).

From the mid-1960s Vilenkin took part in writing school mathematics textbooks and teaching aids for pedagogical-institute students and schoolteachers. His widely used textbooks for grades 4–6, first published in September 1970 (co-authored with K. I. Neshkov, S. I. Shvartsburd, A. D. Semushin, A. S. Chesnokov and T. F. Nechaeva), remained in use for decades. Between 1975 and 1990 he assisted Lyudmila Georgievna Peterson in developing a preschool and school mathematics curriculum. He also taught at Moscow Physics and Mathematics School No. 444, where his teaching materials were used. Vilenkin died in Moscow on October 19, 1991.

== Scientific work ==
Vilenkin's early work, including his doctoral dissertation, was devoted to the theory of topological groups. Developing Pontryagin's theory of characters, he established a connection between the character systems of zero-dimensional compact abelian groups — now known as Vilenkin systems — and a class of orthonormal systems of piecewise-constant functions. Since the 1950s these systems have been studied intensively because of their applications in digital signal processing.

From the mid-1950s he worked on the representation theory of Lie groups, obtaining results connected with the infinite-dimensional representations constructed by I. M. Gelfand and M. A. Naimark. He brought much of this work together in the monograph Special Functions and the Theory of Group Representations (1965), which he later expanded, together with A. U. Klimyk, into the multi-volume Representation of Lie Groups and Special Functions (1991–1995).

== Selected books ==
- Special Functions and the Theory of Group Representations, American Mathematical Society, 1968 (translation of the 1965 Russian monograph)
- Combinatorics by N. Ya. Vilenkin, A. Shenitzer and S. Shenitzer, Academic Press, 1971
- Generalized Functions, Volume 5: Integral Geometry and Representation Theory by I. M. Gelfand, M. I. Graev and N. Ya. Vilenkin, Academic Press, 1966
- Representation of Lie Groups and Special Functions (with A. U. Klimyk), 3 vols., Kluwer, 1991–1993
- Representation of Lie Groups and Special Functions: Recent Advances (with A. U. Klimyk), Kluwer, 1995

== Books on recreational and elementary mathematics ==
- Stories About Sets, Academic Press, 1968
- Combinatorics, Academic Press, 1971
- Successive Approximation (Popular Lectures in Mathematics), Pergamon Press, 1964
- In Search of Infinity, Birkhäuser, 1995

== See also ==
- Vilenkin–Chrestenson transform
- Walsh function
