= Shchusev Museum of Architecture =

Museum in Moscow, Russia

Coordinates: 55°45′8.53″N 37°36′25.98″E

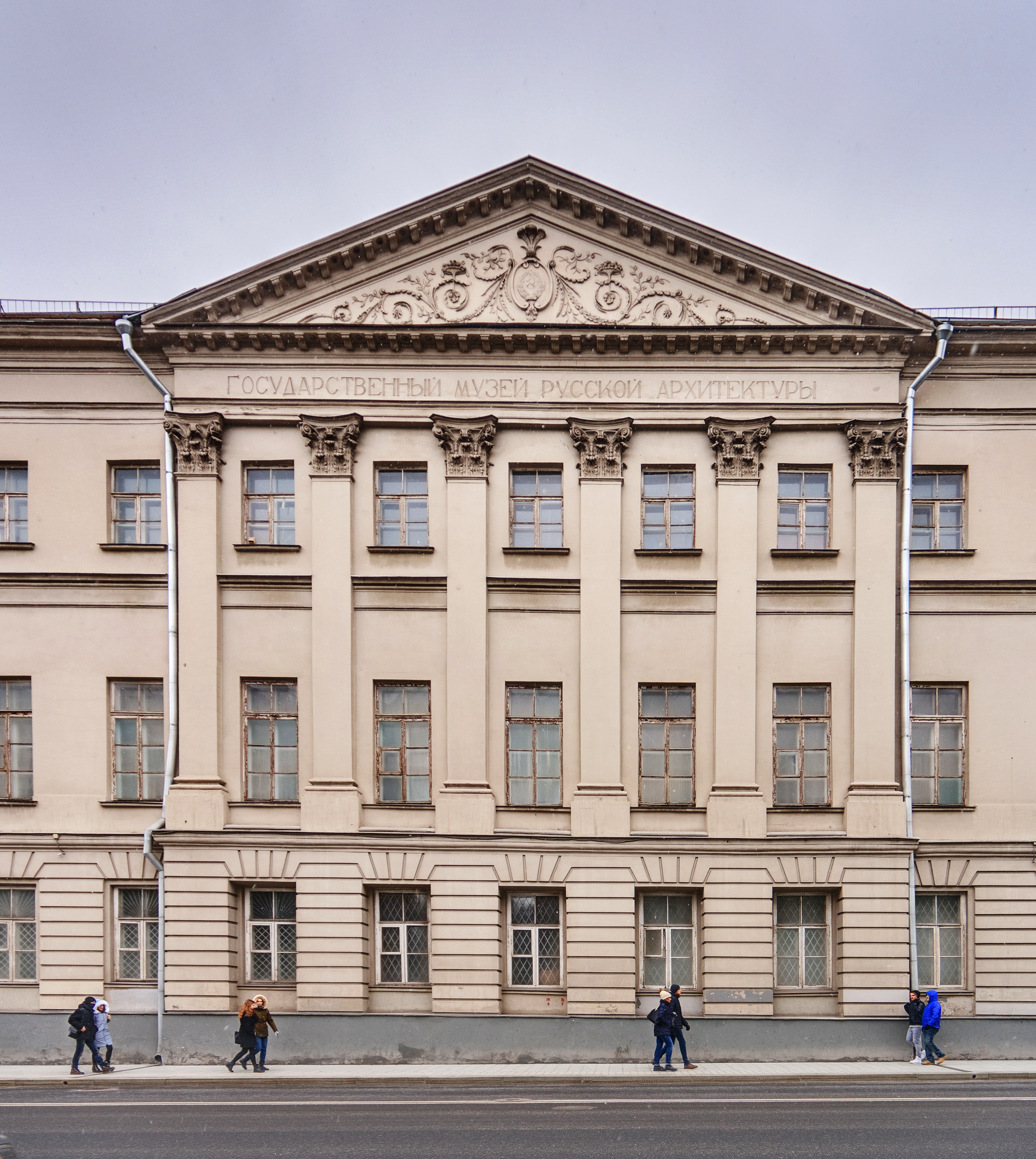
The Talyzin House

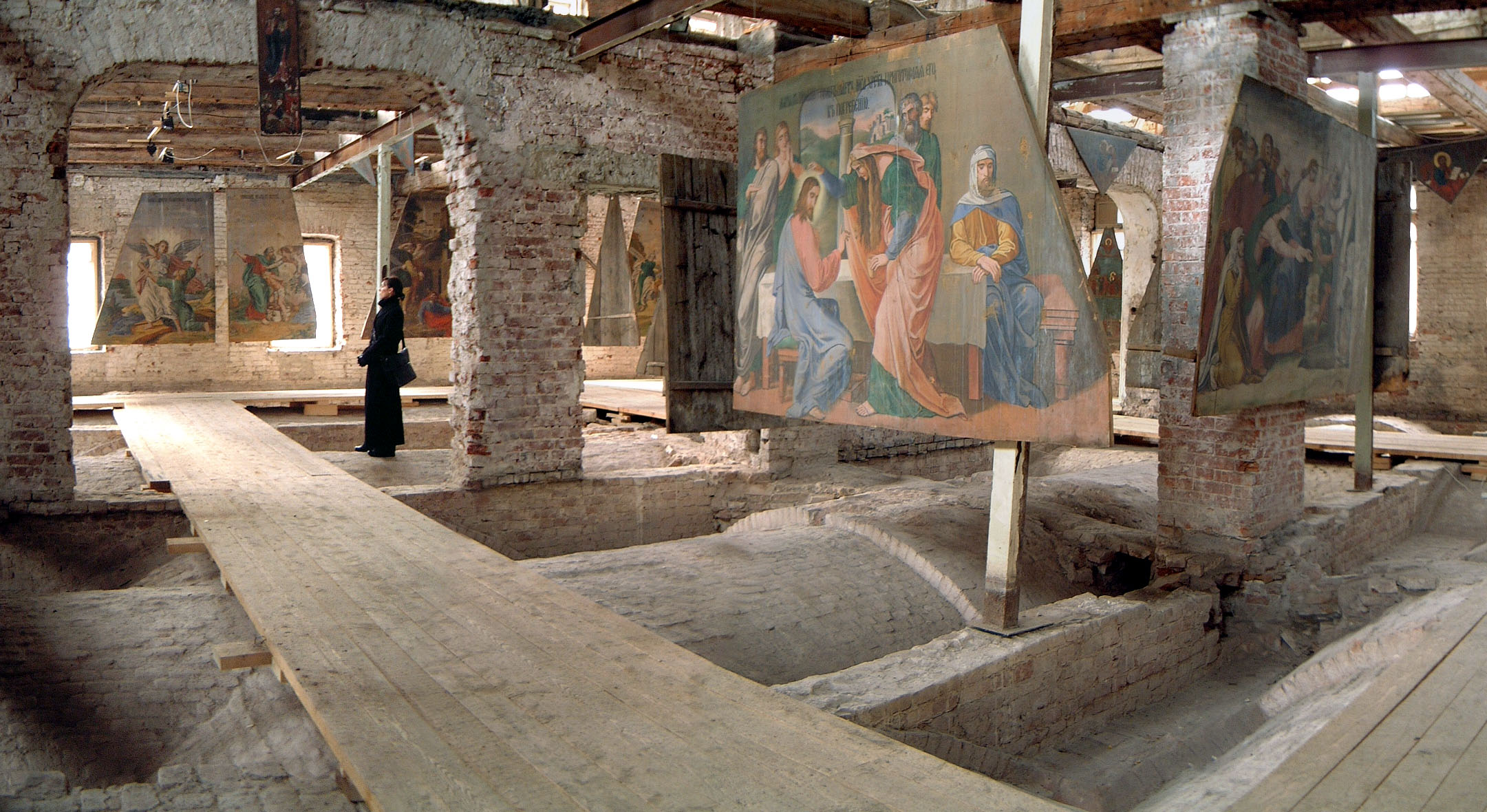
Inside the "Ruin" exhibition hall

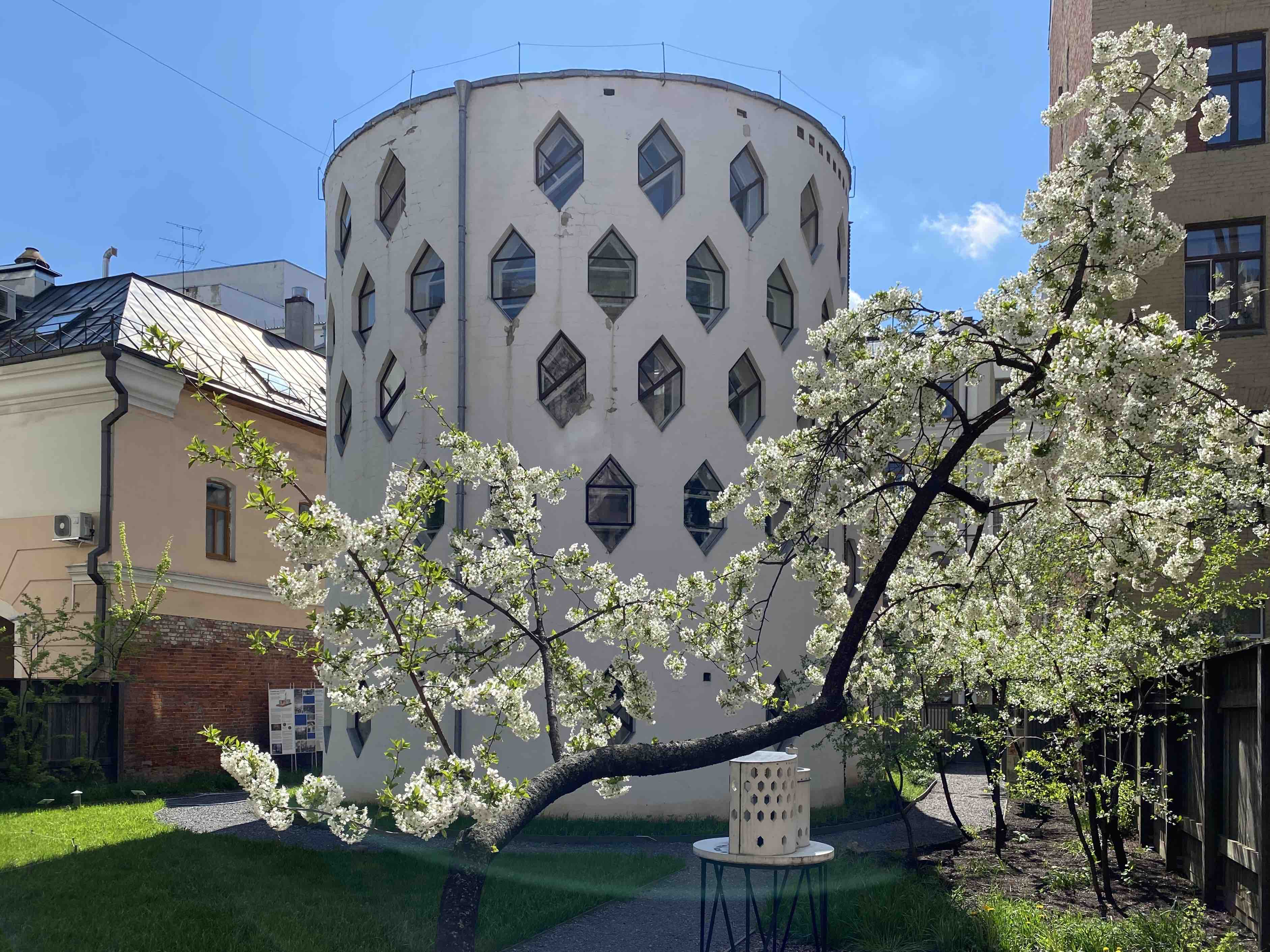
The Melnikov House

The Shchusev Museum of Architecture is a national museum of Russian Architecture located in Moscow the capital of Russia and also a research centre to study and promote the architectural and urban heritage. The museum was founded in 1934 and is located on the Vozdvizhenka Street. The collections include more than 800000 items. The museum is named after Russian and Soviet architect Alexey Shchusev.

== History ==
The original museum of the Academy of Architecture, established in 1934 was located in the secularized Donskoy Monastery. The sprawling fortified monastery housed hundreds of fragments of art salvaged from the demolished buildings. The museum was dedicated, at least officially, to worldwide architecture of all periods and styles, although most tangible exhibits were Russian.

In the summer of 1945 Alexey Shchusev began campaigning for the establishment of a museum of Russian national architecture. The new museum was established in 1946, with Shchusev as its first director. He personally picked the former Talyzin House, then occupied by the NKVD, and used his connections within the organization to free it up for the museum. Under Shchusev's management the museum became a refuge for the unemployed Jews hit by the anti-cosmopolitan campaign, like David Arkin, Abram Efros and Alexander Gabrichevsky. The Baldin Collection of German art was secretly deposited in the museum, with Shchusev's consent, in 1948. However, the main purpose of the museum, as envisaged by Shchusev himself, was the recording and archiving of Russian heritage that was destroyed or damaged during the war. For the first ten years, it operated primarily as a research and archive institution; the first permanent public exhibition opened in 1957.

In 1964, after Nikita Khrushchev had disbanded the Academy of Architecture, the two museums were merged into the Shchusev Museum of Architecture. The Donskoy Monastery and the Talyzin House exhibited pre-revolutionary Russian and post-revolutionary Soviet exhibits, respectively. In 1991 the government expelled the museum from the monastery. Some exhibits were evacuated to the Talyzin House, others remained within the monastery walls. The Talyzin House, meanwhile, was falling apart after decades of poor maintenance and vibration from subway trains, and had to be closed for a lengthy restoration.

In the 21st century, the museum operates three main exhibition sites in Vozdvizhenka Street: the reconstructed Talyzin House, the nearby "Ruin" building, and the 17th-century building of the former Medicinal Prikaz. The Melnikov House became part of the museum in 2018.

== Directors ==
- Alexey Shchusev (1945 – May 1949)
- Naum Minkin (acting, June 1949 – November 24, 1949)
- Sergey Chernyshyov (November 24, 1949 – January 1, 1954)
- Nikolai Vinogradov (acting, January 25, 1954 – July 30, 1956)
- Naum Kabukovsky (July 30, 1956 – February 1962)
- Elena Panfilenko (February 1962 – July 15, 1963)
- Victor Baldin (July 15, 1963 – 1987)
- Vladimir Rezvin (1990–2000)
- David Sargsyan (2000–2010)
- Irina Korobina (2010–2017)
- Irina Chepkunova (acting, January 2017 – March 2017)
- Elizaveta Likhacheva (2017–2023)
- Natalia Shashkova (March 2023 – present)

== Sources ==
- Vaskin, A. [in Russian] (2015). Щусев: Зодчий всея Руси [Shchusev: The architect of All Russia]. Молодая гвардия. ISBN 9785235038073.
