= Hexagonal window =

A hexagonal window, also called a Melnikov's window or honeycomb window, is a hexagonal window, resembling a honeycomb cell or the crystal lattice of graphite. The window can be vertically or horizontally oriented, and openable or fixed. It can also be regular or elongated in shape and can have a separator (mullion or transom).

== Overview ==
Typically, the cellular window is used for an attic or as a decorative feature, but it can also be a major architectural element to provide the natural lighting inside buildings. The hexagonal window is relatively rare and associated with such architectural styles as constructivism, functionalism and, occasionally, cubism.

== History ==
Attic hexagonal windows were occasionally used in the Northern European manor architecture of the 19th century. The concept became popular thanks to the Russian constructivist architect Konstantin Melnikov, whose own famous house had 124 hexagonal windows, which were the main source of light as ceiling lights were not provided in many rooms. Cellular windows are also a feature of the Scandinavian functionalism architecture of the 1940s–1960s and are a kind of synthesis of tradition and modernism in the architecture.

Today, hexagonal windows may be associated with honeycomb houses, a concept proposed by architect Frank Lloyd Wright and explore an idea of organic architecture, which considers the nature as a main source of architectural imagination.

== Gallery ==
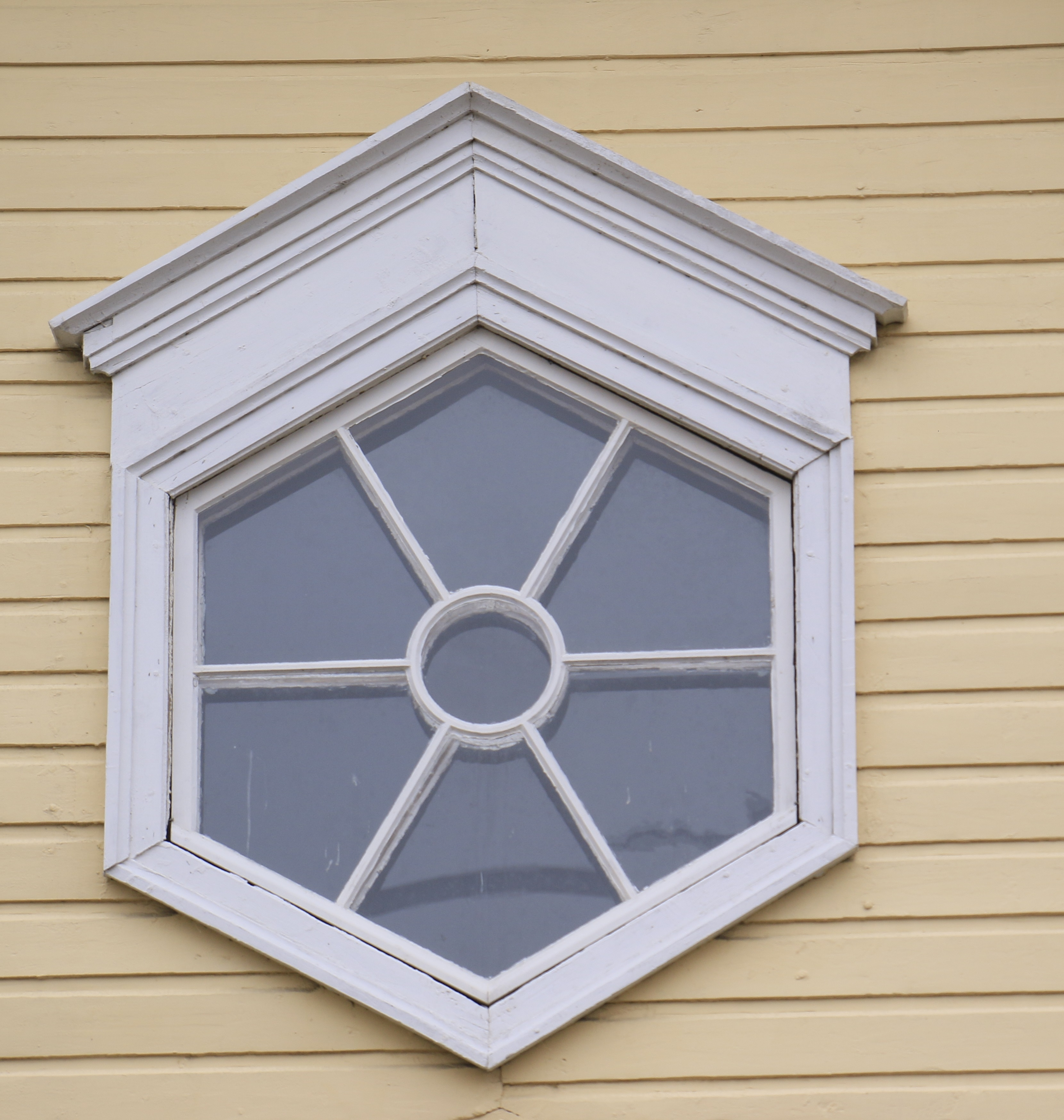
Mustonen House, 1870, Joensuu, Finland.

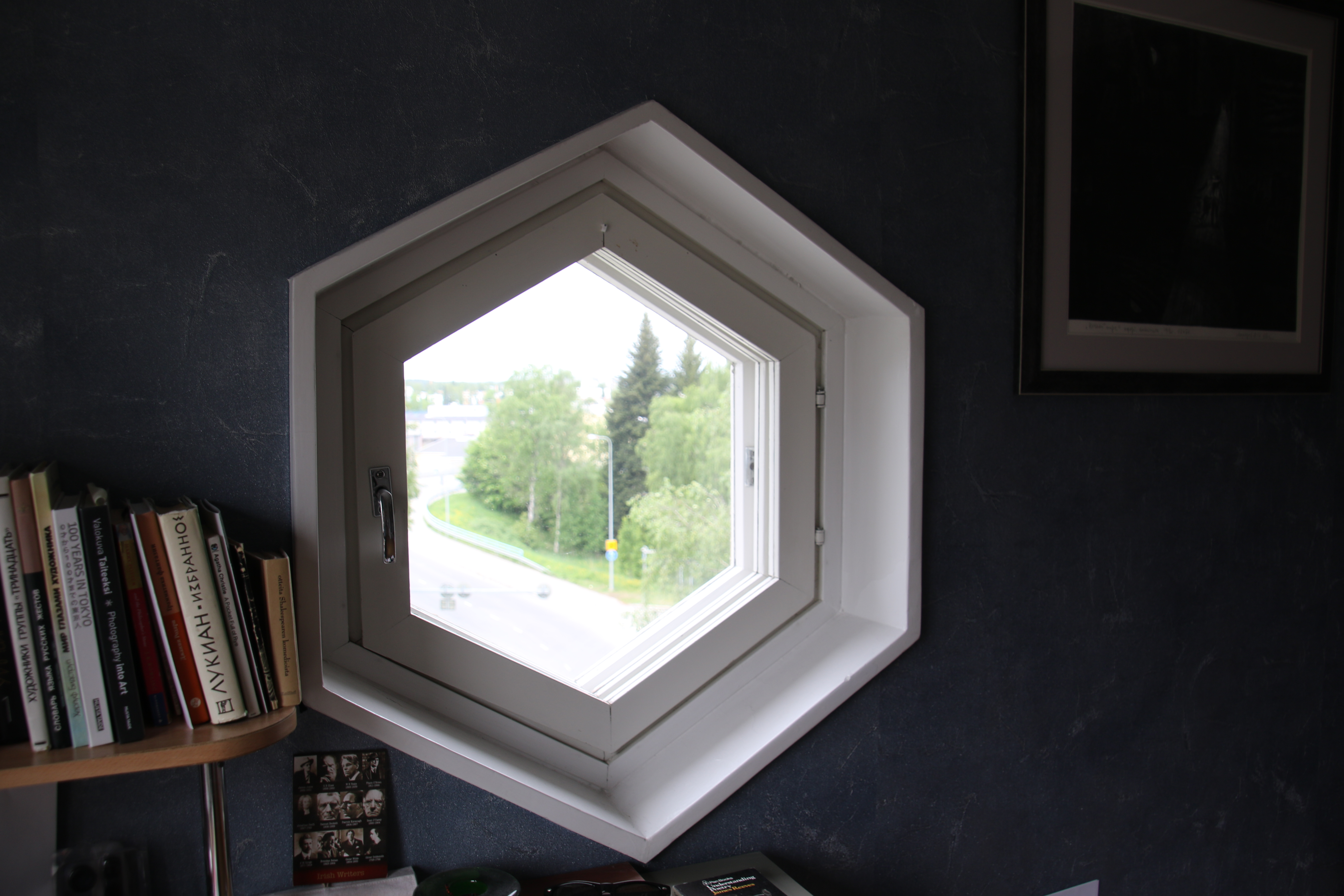
Internal view of hexagonal window.

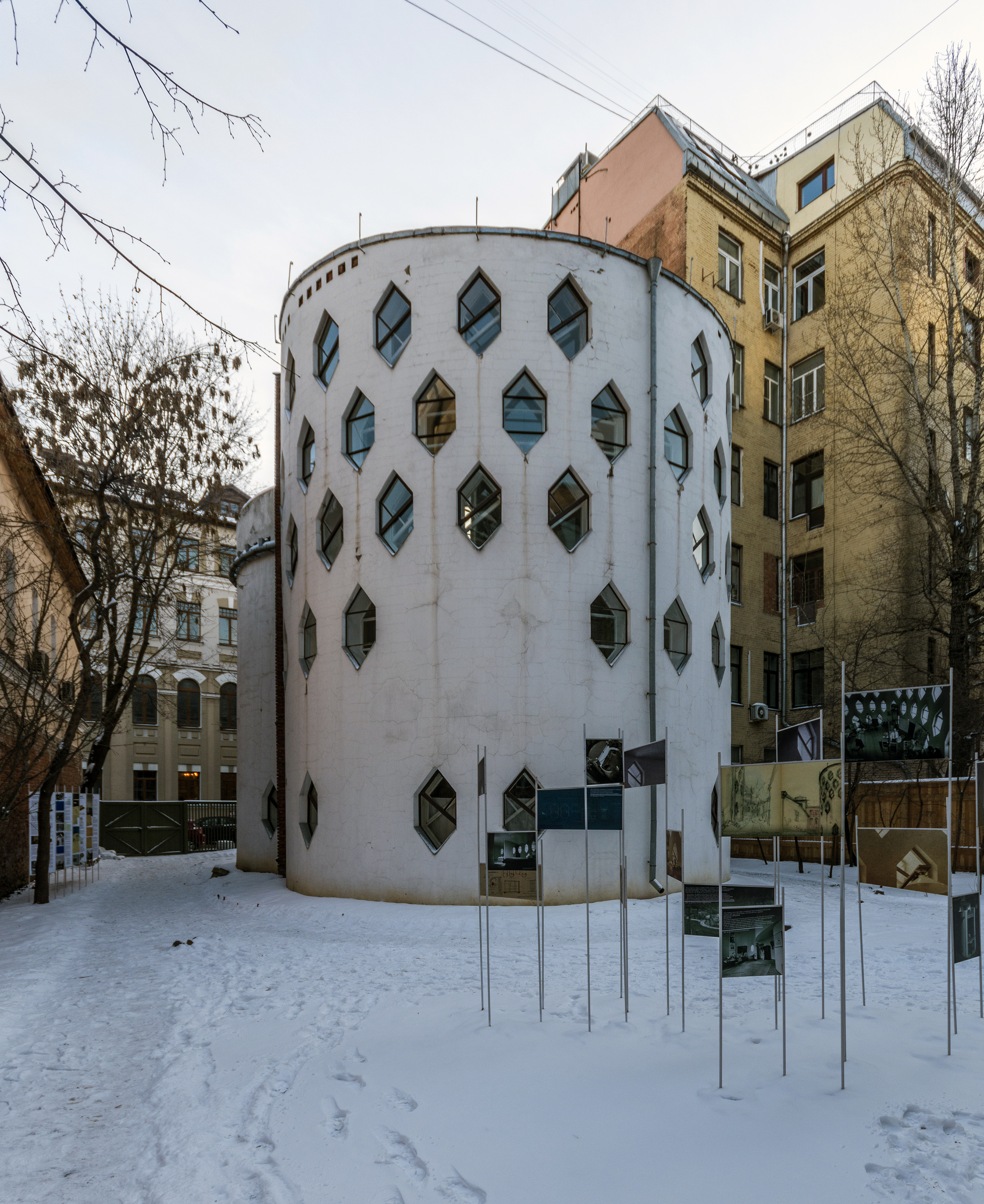
Melnikov House, Moscow, Russia.

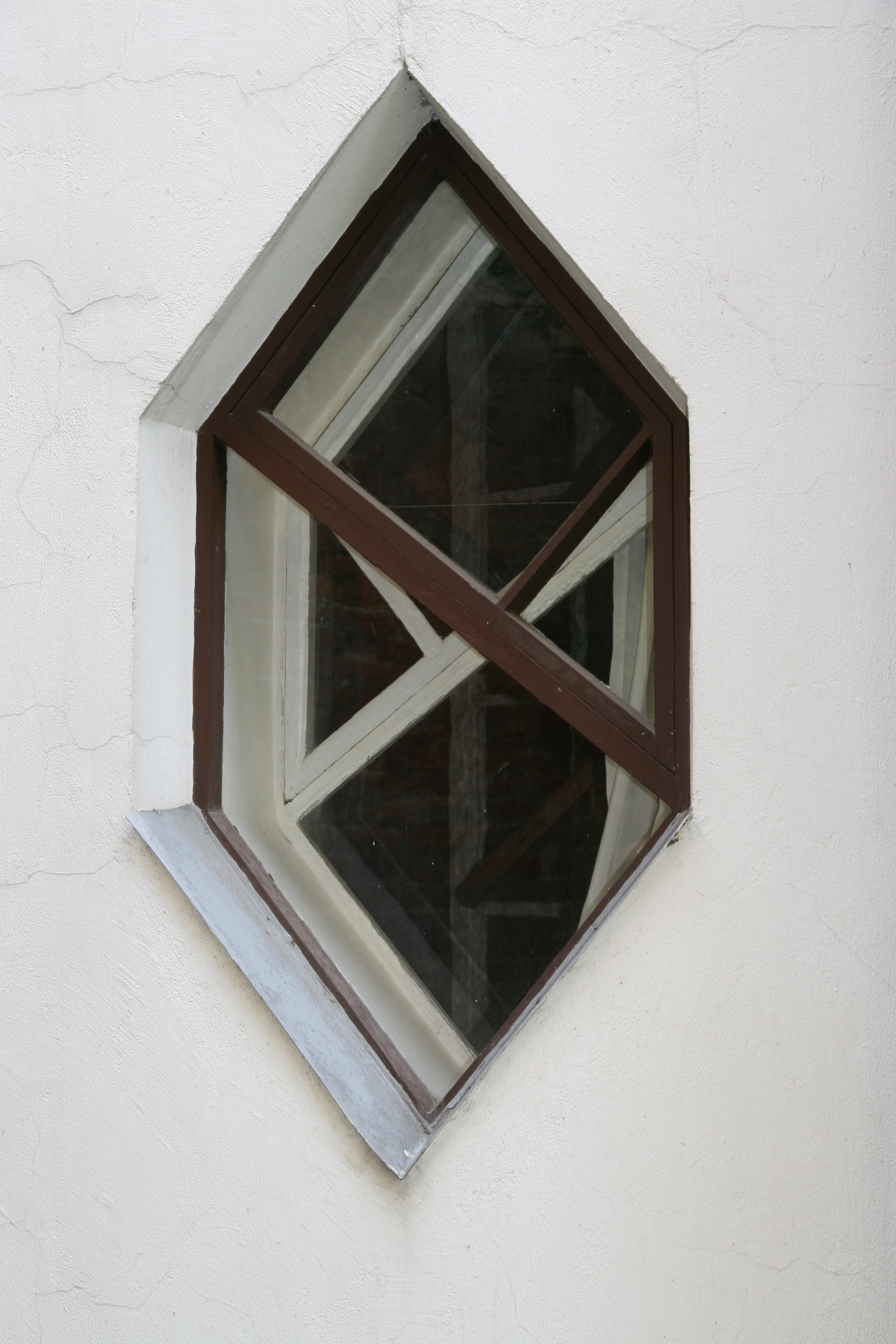
Hexagonal window with diagonal mullions, Melnikov House.

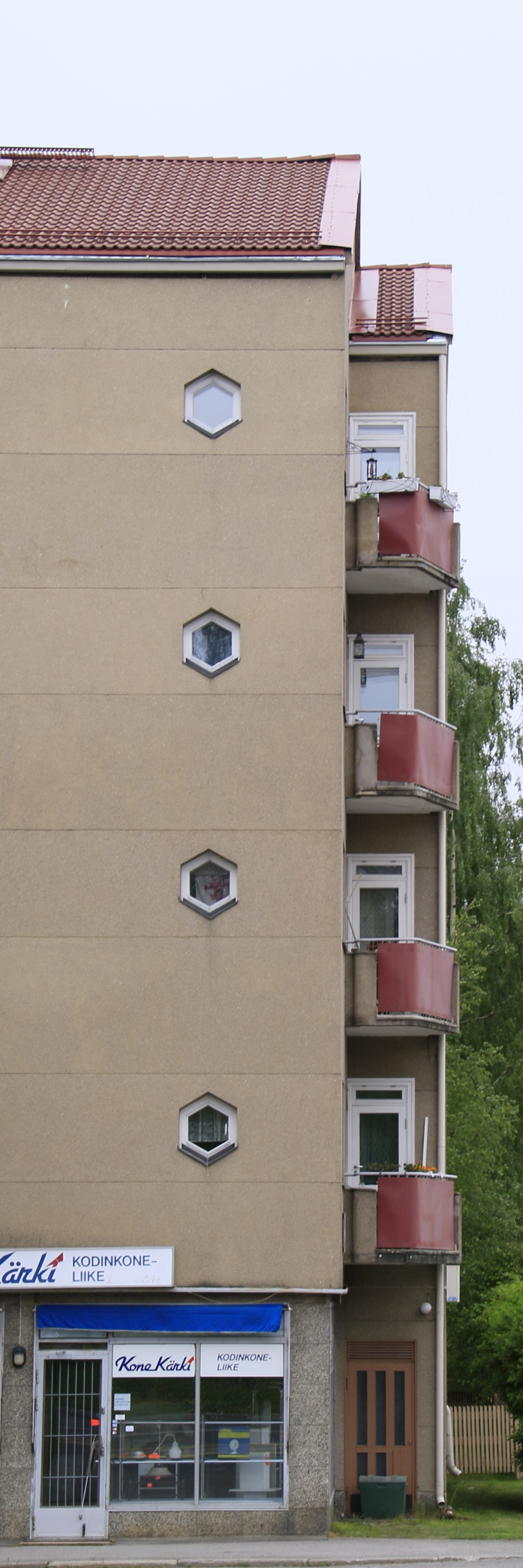
Vertical chain of hexagonal windows, Finland, 1950s.

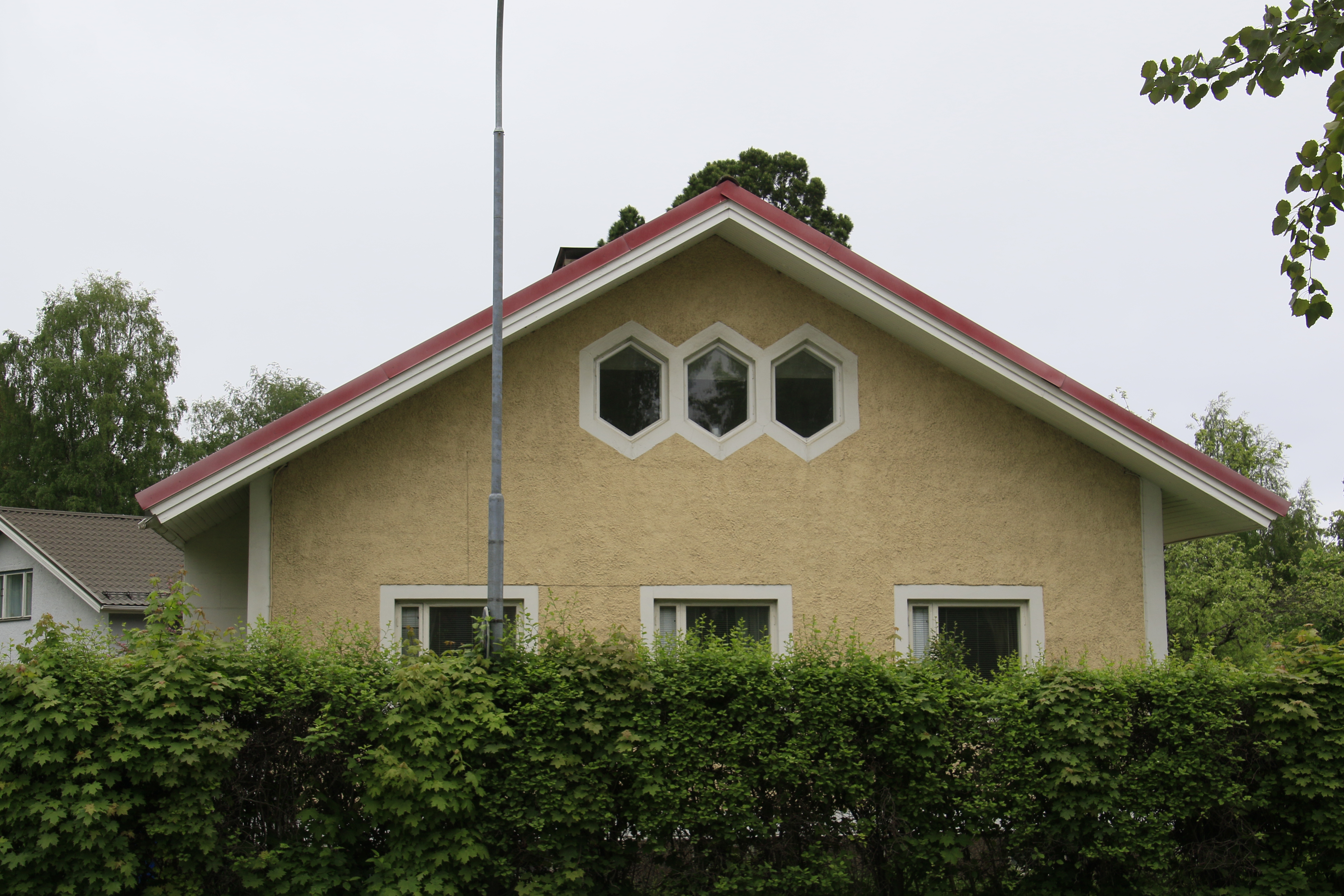
Triple cellular window in private mansion in Finland, 1960s.

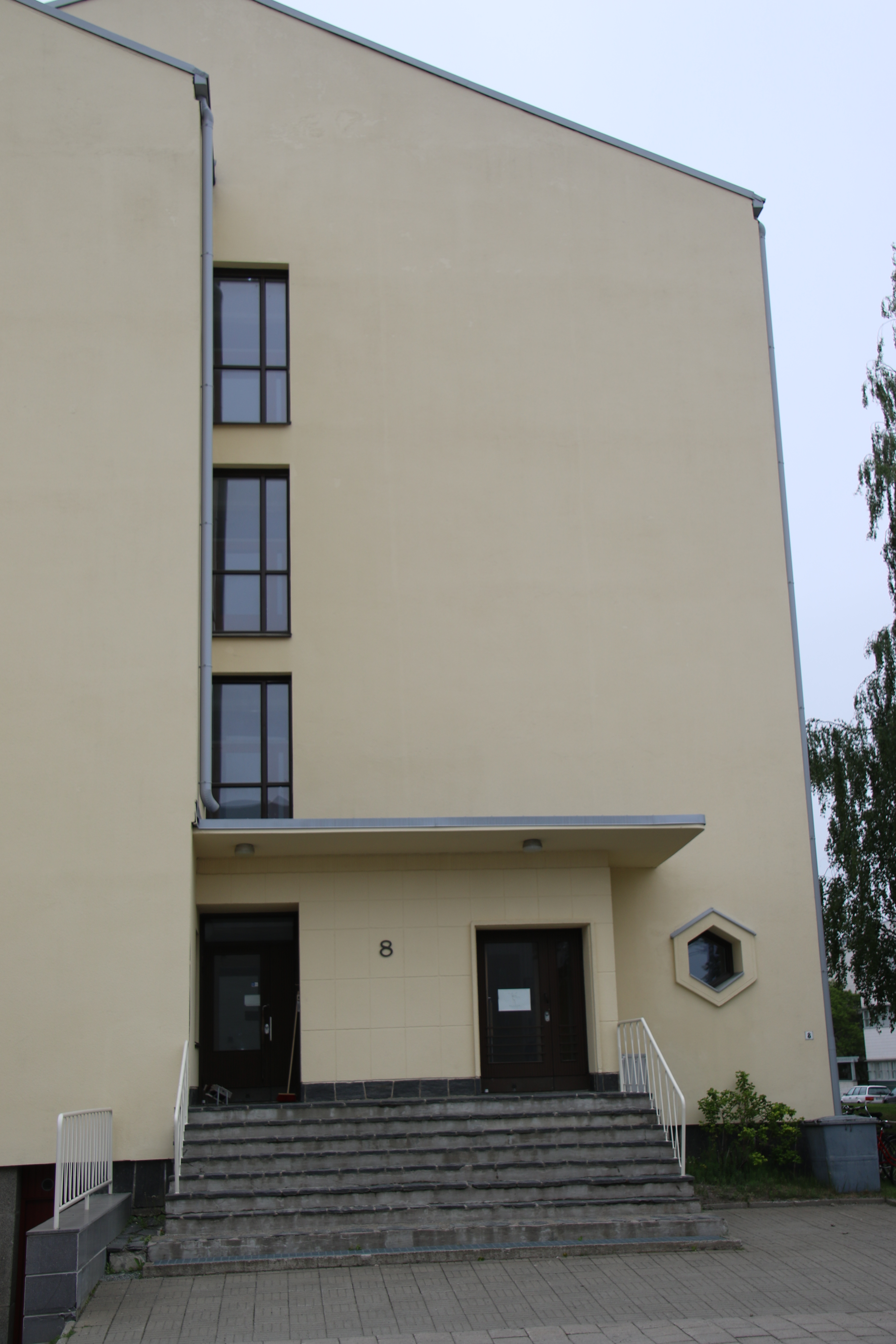
Hexagonal window at the right bottom part of building, Finnish functionalism.

== See also ==
- Chicago window
