= Tsoi Wall =

Graffiti-covered wall in Moscow, Russia

Coordinates: 55.7491°N 37.5909°E

- Russian: Стена Цоя
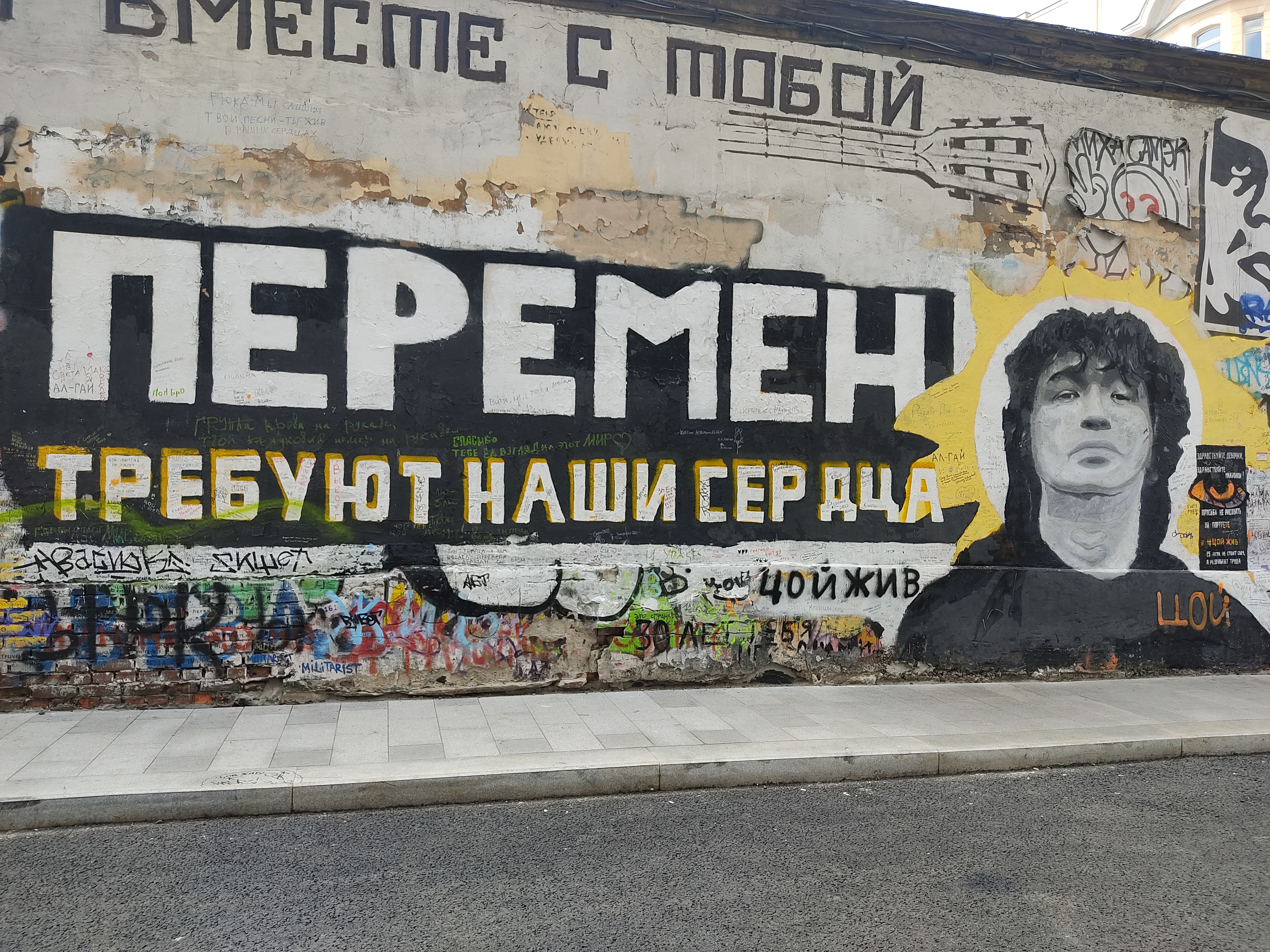
- The Tsoi Wall in 2022, featuring the refrain "Our hearts demand changes" (Перемен требуют наши сердца) from the song Khochu peremen
- Year: 1990
- Medium: Graffiti
- Movement: Post-punk
- Subject: Viktor Tsoi

The Tsoi Wall (or Tsoi's Wall; Стена Цоя) is a graffiti-covered wall in Moscow, dedicated to musician Viktor Tsoi and his band Kino. The wall is located at the house №37, at the intersection of Arbat Street and Krivoarbatsky Lane and is considered one of Moscow's landmarks. It is customary for Tsoi's fans to leave a broken lit cigarette in the special ash plate by the wall.

Frequently visited by Tsoi's fans, the wall has become a place to hide a note for a friend or arrange a meeting. There are also memory walls of Tsoi in other cities, such as Saint Petersburg, Khabarovsk, Dnipro and Sevastopol.

== History ==
The wall was first inscribed on 15 August 1990 with "Viktor Tsoi has died today" (Сегодня погиб Виктор Цой) in black. Subsequently, someone inscribed a reply: "Tsoi is alive!" (Цой жив!) Later, many other inscriptions were added, including snippets from Kino's songs "Pachka sigaret" ("Pack of Cigarettes") and "Muraveinik" ("Anthill"). In 2006 the wall was painted over by the Art Destroy Project members, but the graffiti was restored by Tsoi's fans. In 2009 the Moscow authorities announced plans to renovate the wall, but the plans were met with skepticism and were dropped.

A monument of a barefoot Tsoi, sitting on a motorcycle, was planned to be installed near the wall, but the idea was rejected by local residents and Tsoi's fans.

== See also ==
- Lennon Wall
