= Ludmila Peterson =

Russian teacher

- Born: Soviet Union
- Occupation: Educator
- Language: Russian
- Citizenship: Russian Federation
- Subject: Education, pedagogy, mathematics

Ludmila Georgievna Peterson, (Russian: Людми́ла Гео́ргиевна Пе́терсон) is a Russian educator, Doktor nauk (corresponds to a higher degree than a Ph.D.). Author of mathematical curricula for preK-Middle School students. Namely she created textbooks and workbooks:

- “Playbook – Steps to school” ("Игралочка – ступеньки к школе")
- "Learn to Learn" ("Учись учиться")
- and others

She is Chief Scientist of Center of Active Education "School 2000", ("Школа 2000") and "Perspective", ("Перспектива") Complex of Education. In northern spring of 2014 mathematical textbooks by Ludmila Peterson didn't pass annual state Evaluation and excluded from federally approved list of textbooks for 2014/2015. The evaluator from Russian Academy of Education stated that "It is unlikely the contents of the textbook will encourage the sense of patriotism and pride for the Country and the People".
