= Krivoarbatsky Lane =

Street in Moscow, Russia

Coordinates: 55°44′53″N 37°35′26″E

Krivoarbatsky Lane (Russian: Кривоарба́тский переу́лок; from Russian "кривой", krivoy, meaning "curved") is a small sidestreet near the Arbat Street. It is most notable for its curved form and the Wall of Viktor Tsoi, a Russian musician. This street is also notable for some informal youth gatherings.
