= Dholakia =

Dholakia is an Indian toponymic surname from Dholka in Ahmedabad, Gujarat, India. Notable people with the surname include:

- Aayushi Dholakia, an Indian model, winner of Miss Teen International (India) 2019
- Bakul Harshadrai Dholakia (born 1947), an Indian economist, former Director of Indian Institute of Management Ahmedabad from 2002–2007
- Danae Dholakia, a British diplomat, Deputy Head of the British Embassy in Moscow
- Dilip Dholakia (1921–2011), an Indian film score composer and singer in Hindi and Gujarati cinema
- Govind Dholakia (born 1949), an Indian businessman and politician, Member of Rajya Sabha from Gujarat
- Jay Dholakia, an Indian politician from the Bharatiya Janata Party, member of the Odisha Legislative Assembly from Nuapada
- Jhaverilal K. Dholakia (1886–1978), an Indian coal mining engineer
- K. T. Dholakia (1920–2004), an Indian orthopedic surgeon, a pioneer of the joint replacement surgery in India
- Kundanlal Dholakia (1920–2011), an Indian politician from Gujarat
- Navnit Dholakia, Baron Dholakia (born 1937), a British Liberal Democrat politician
- Rahul Dholakia, an Indian film director, producer, and screenwriter
- Savji Dholakia (born 1962), an Indian businessman, founder and chairman of the diamond company Hari Krishna Exports
- Rajat Dholakia a.k.a. Juku (born 1957), an Indian film score composer in Hindi cinema, son of Dilip
- Rajendra Dholakia (1956–2025), an Indian politician, member of the Odisha Legislative Assembly
- Rajeshwari Dholakia (born 1959), an Indian cricketer
- Urvashi Dholakia (born 1979), an Indian television actress, best known for her role as Komolika in Kasautii Zindagii Kay
