= Embassy of the United Kingdom, Moscow =

Chief diplomatic mission of the United Kingdom in the Russian Federation

Embassy of the United Kingdom in Moscow
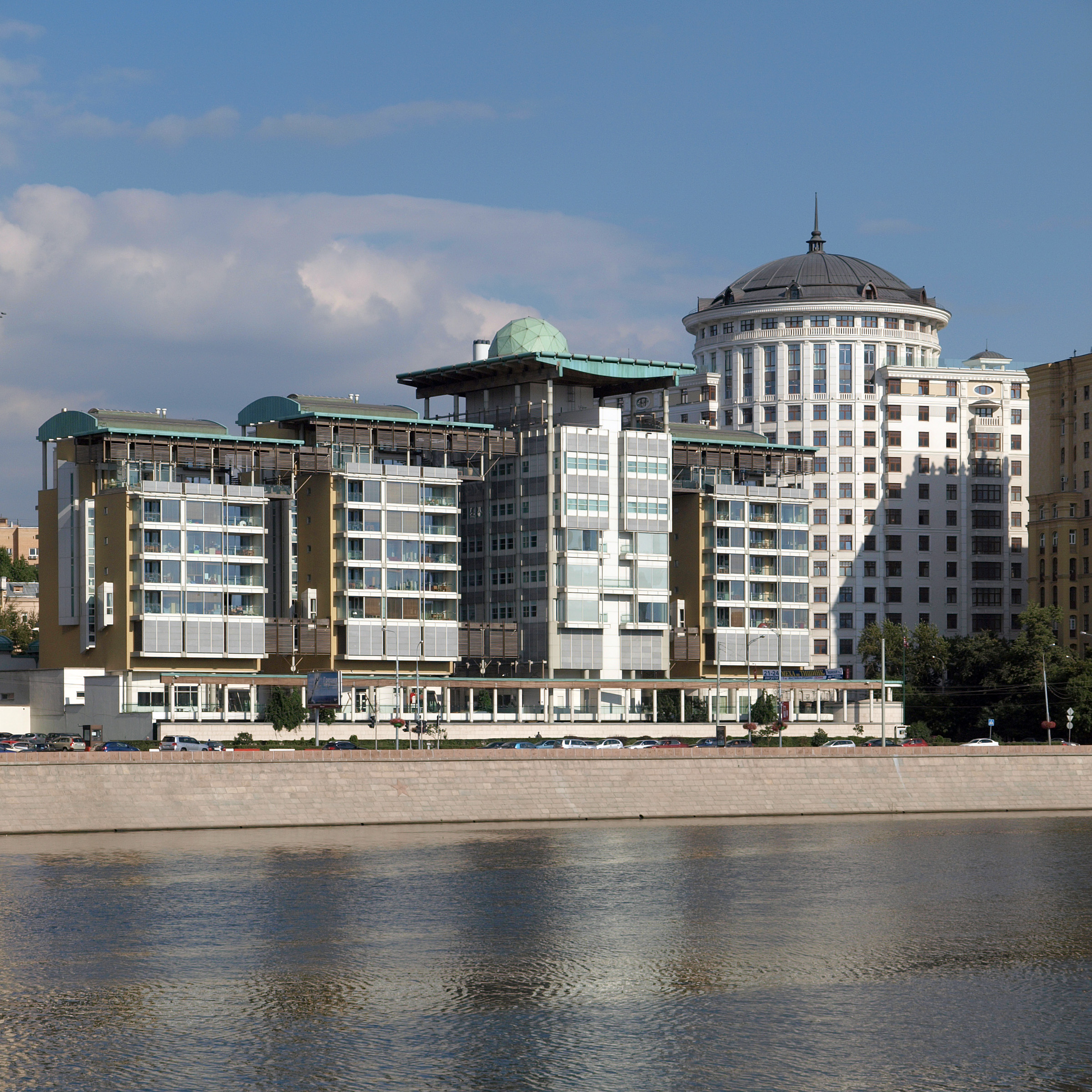
- Location: Arbat District, Moscow, Russia
- Address: 1 Lugansk People's Republic Square (Note: The UK still refers to its address from before the renaming of the street, 10 Smolenskaya Embankment.)
- Coordinates: 55°45′01″N 37°34′37″E
- Ambassador: Nigel Casey
- Website: Office website

The Embassy of the United Kingdom in Moscow is the chief diplomatic mission of the United Kingdom in the Russian Federation. It is located in the Arbat District of Moscow, on Smolenskaya Embankment of the river Moskva. The current ambassador is Nigel Casey.

== History ==
Before the October Revolution of 1917, the British embassy in Russia was seated in Saint Petersburg, in a palace overlooking the Troitsky Bridge. Diplomatic relations were broken off when the last ambassador, Sir George Buchanan, left Moscow on 26 December 1918.

In 1924, after the Russian Civil War, the UK was the first foreign power to recognize the new Soviet government, sending an ambassador to Moscow in 1924. In 1929, the UK was provided with a mansion on the Sofiyskaya Embankment, on the Island (Zamoskvorechye), near the Kremlin in Moscow. The mansion was built in 1893 for the sugar magnate, Pavel Kharitonenko, and claimed by the state in 1917 following the Russian Revolution. The British embassy remained there until 2000, after which it has solely served as the British ambassador's residence.

In the mid-1960s, the present embassy site at 10 Smolenskaya Embankment, near the Novoarbatsky Bridge, comprising 2.27 acres (0.92 hectares), was offered to the British Government, but it was not until March 1987 that an agreement was signed for the land to be exchanged for two sites in London. The architects for the new embassy were Ahrends, Burton and Koralek (ABK) of London and Dublin, and the new complex was officially opened by Anne, Princess Royal on 17 May 2000.

The present embassy building contains offices for 250 staff; 31 flats for staff and facilities for their recreation and welfare, including a swimming pool and cafeteria, medical centre and kindergarten, workshops and stores; and covered car parking for 85 cars.

In 2007, a sculpture by Andrey Orlov of Sherlock Holmes and Doctor Watson, as portrayed by Vasily Livanov and Vitaly Solomin, was erected on the embankment alongside the embassy.

In July 2022, the city authorities renamed the section of the Smolenskaya Embankment where the embassy stands to the Luhansk People's Republic Square, celebrating the Luhansk People's Republic; the embassy stated that it would continue to use the previous address. At the same time, Moscow renamed an intersection near the United States Embassy as Donetsk People's Republic Square. The Moscow authorities stated that this was in retaliation for a one-block section of Wisconsin Avenue in front of the Embassy of Russia, Washington, D.C., being renamed in honor of Boris Nemtsov, a former Russian First Deputy Prime Minister shot dead by assassins in 2015.

In 2026, Danae Dholakia (the Chargé d'Affaires) has twice been summoned to the Russian Foreign Ministry regarding the expulsion of British diplomats:

- In January 2026 she was summoned when a British diplomat was expelled from Russia after allegedly spying.
- On 31 March 2026 she was again summoned to the Russian Foreign Ministry after another expulsion.

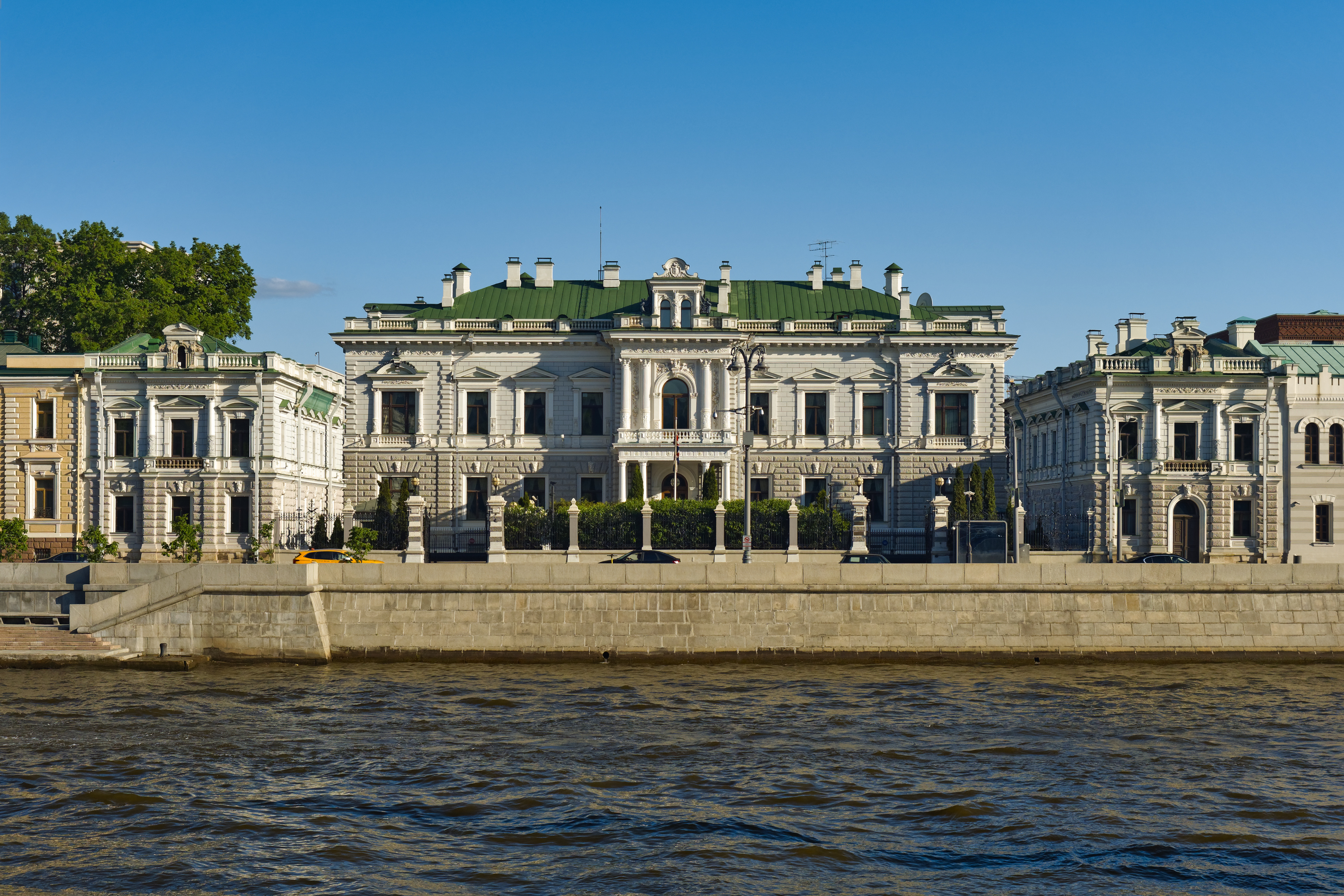
Kharitonenko Mansion, 14 Sofiyskaya Embankment - Residence of the British ambassador to Russia, site of the British Embassy until 2000.

== Outside Moscow ==
Outside Moscow, there is currently one British Consulate-General in Yekaterinburg where the senior officer is the Consul-General. A British Consulate-General in Saint Petersburg was established in 1992, but it was closed in 2018 because of a diplomatic fallout following the poisoning of a former Russian intelligence officer in the United Kingdom.

== See also ==
- List of ambassadors of the United Kingdom to Russia
- Russia-United Kingdom relations
- Consulate-General of the United Kingdom, Saint Petersburg
- Diplomatic missions in Russia
