= Russia–United Kingdom relations =

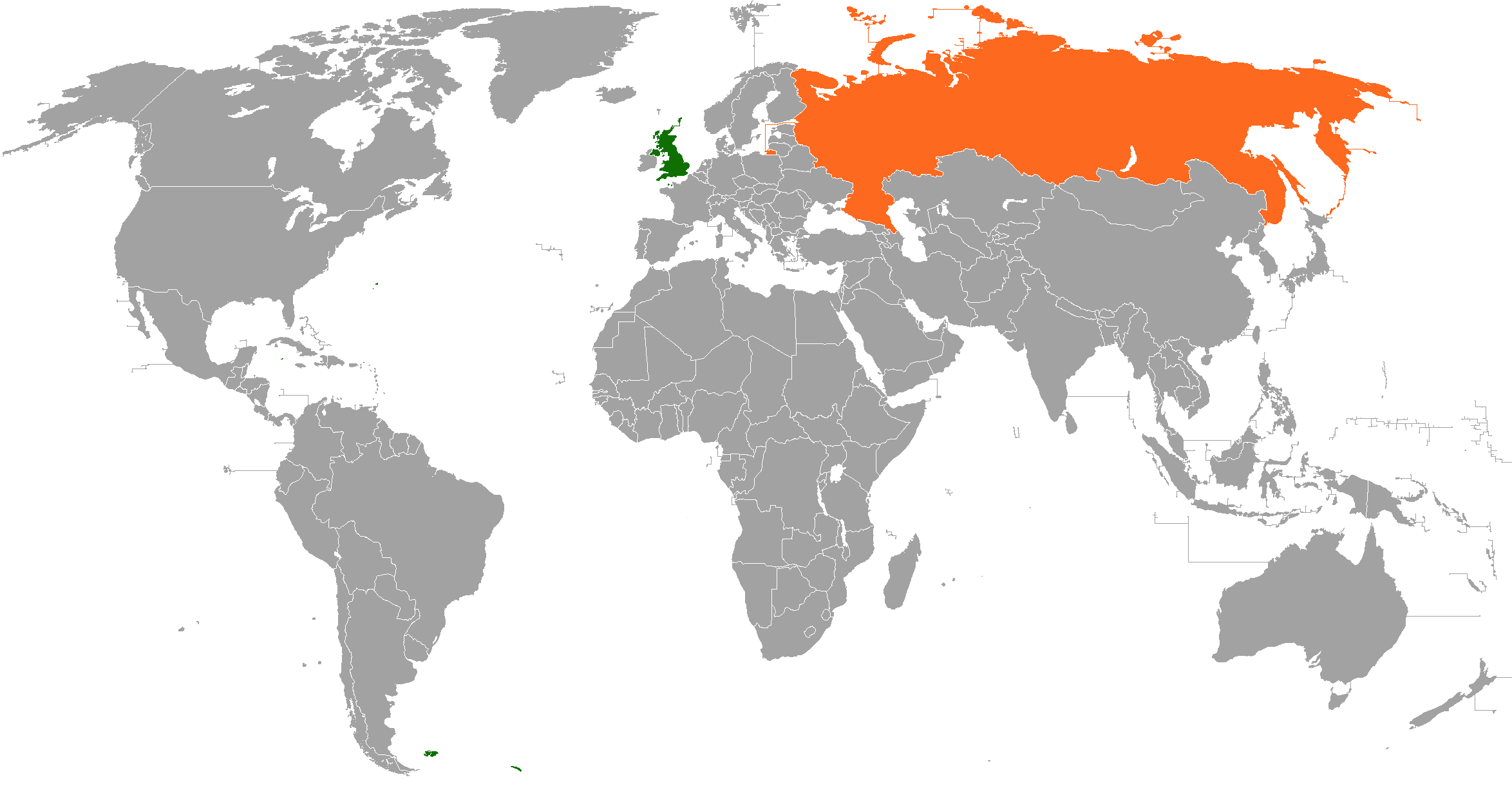

- United Kingdom: Russia

Diplomatic mission
- British Embassy, Moscow: Embassy of Russia, London

Envoy
- Ambassador Nigel Casey: Ambassador Vacant

Russia–United Kingdom relations, also Anglo-Russian relations, are the bilateral relations between the Russian Federation and the United Kingdom of Great Britain and Northern Ireland. Formal ties between the nations started in 1553. Russia and Britain became allies against Napoleon in the early-19th century. They were enemies in the Crimean War of the 1850s, and rivals in the Great Game for control of Central Asia in the latter half of the 19th century. They allied again in World Wars I and II, although the Russian Revolution of 1917 strained relations. The two countries again became enemies during the Cold War (1947–1989). Russia's business tycoons developed strong ties with London financial institutions in the 1990s after the dissolution of the USSR in 1991. Due to the Russian invasion of Ukraine, relations became very tense after the United Kingdom imposed sanctions against Russia. It was subsequently added to Russia's list of "unfriendly countries".

The two countries share a history of intense espionage activity against each other, with the Soviet Union succeeding in penetration of top echelons of the British intelligence and security establishment in the 1930s–1950s while concurrently, the British co-opted top Russian intelligence officers throughout the period including the 1990s whereby British spies such as Sergei Skripal acting within the Russian intelligence establishment passed on extensive details of their intelligence agents operating throughout Europe. Since the 19th century, England has been a popular destination for Russian political exiles, refugees, and wealthy fugitives from the Russophone world.

In the early-21st century, especially following the poisoning of Alexander Litvinenko in 2006, relations became strained. In the early years of David Cameron as UK prime minister, there was a brief uptick in relations, up until 2014. Since 2014, relations have grown increasingly unfriendly due to the Russo-Ukrainian War (2014–present) and the poisoning of Sergei and Yulia Skripal in 2018. In the wake of the poisoning, 28 countries expelled suspected Russian spies acting as diplomats. In June 2021, a confrontation occurred between HMS Defender and the Russian Armed Forces in the 2021 Black Sea incident.

Following the Russian invasion of Ukraine, relations between the two nuclear powers collapsed entirely; the United Kingdom imposed economic sanctions on Russian outlets, seized the assets of Russian oligarchs, recalled its citizens and severed all business ties with Russia. Russia retaliated with its own sanctions against the UK and accused it of involvement in attacks against Sevastopol Naval Base, the Nord Stream gas pipeline and the Crimean Bridge. The UK is one of the largest donors of financial and military aid to Ukraine and was the first country in Europe to donate lethal military aid.

== Historical background ==
=== Relations 1553–1792 ===
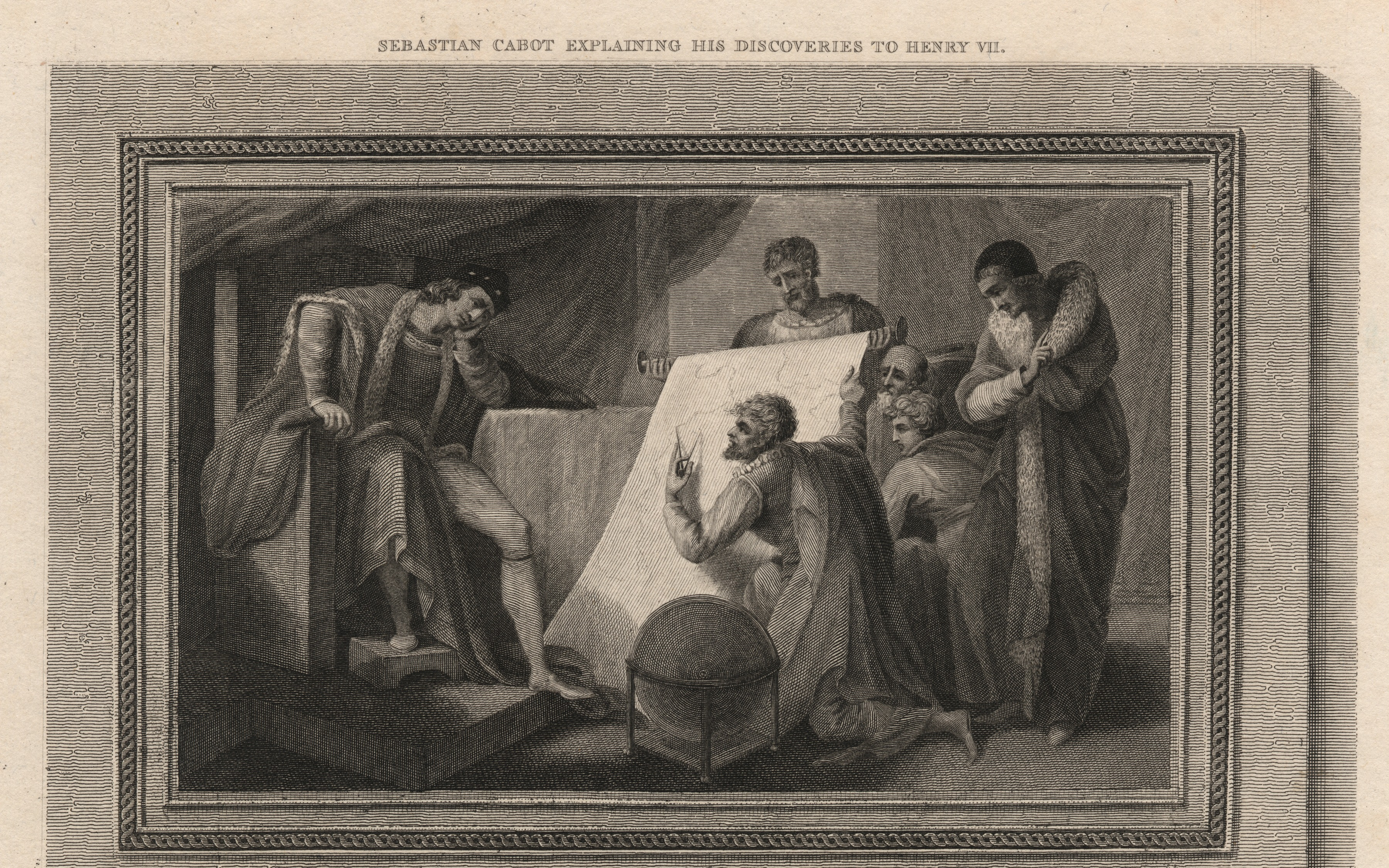
The Venetian Sebastiano Caboto explains his discoveries to Henry VII of England. Caboto, together with John Dee, helped with the preparations for the expedition led by Hugh Willoughby und Richard Chancellor, they hoped to find a northeast sea route to China, he became governor of the Muscovy Company

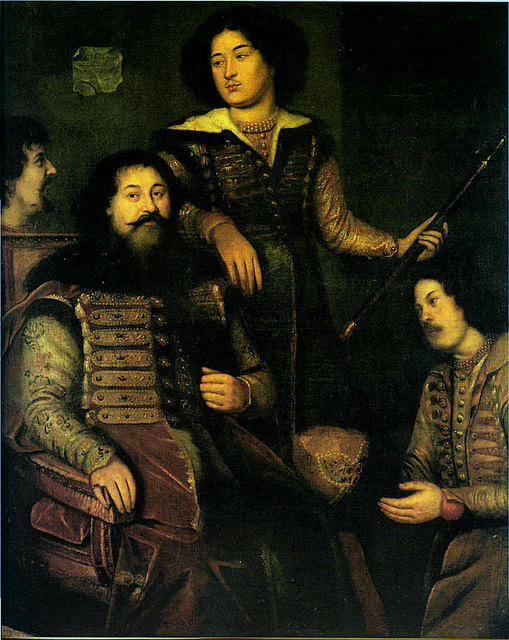
Group portrait of the participants of the 1662 Russian embassy to England: Prince Pyotr Semyonovich Prozorovsky, Ivan Davydov, Ivan Afanasyevich Zhelyabuzhsky, Andrey Forot (translator). Unknown English painter, 1662.

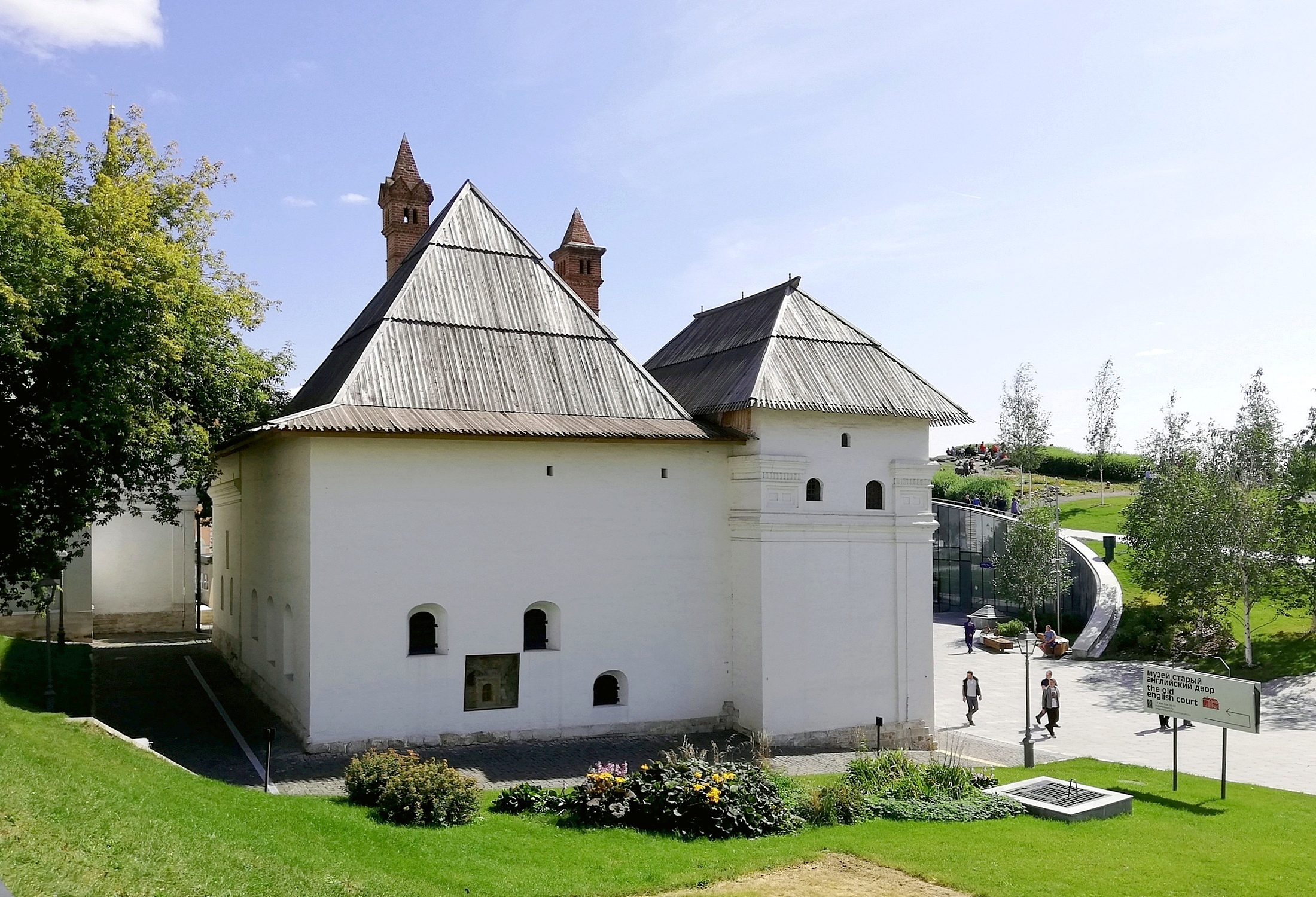
The Old English Court in Moscow – headquarters of the Muscovy Company and the residence of English ambassadors in the 17th century

The Kingdom of England and Tsardom of Russia established relations in 1553 when English navigator Richard Chancellor arrived at a port that later became Arkhangelsk (Archangel) in the White Sea – at which time Mary I ruled England and Ivan the Terrible ruled Russia. He returned to England and was sent back to Russia in 1555, the same year the Muscovy Company was established.

Tsar Ivan IV of Russia and Queen Elizabeth I of England maintained diplomatic relations in the late 16th century through intermediaries such as the English merchant and diplomat Anthony Jenkinson. In the late 1570s, Ivan IV sent ambassadors to England with a proposal of marriage to Elizabeth herself. This was a strategic move, likely aimed at securing an alliance with England, which was a rising maritime power. For Ivan, such an alliance could have provided a counterbalance to the influence of other European powers. Elizabeth, known for her diplomatic shrewdness, did not outright reject the proposal but responded with diplomatic politeness, avoiding a direct refusal while also not seriously entertaining the proposal. The marriage never materialized, and the correspondence between Ivan and Elizabeth continued for some time.

The Muscovy Company held a monopoly over trade between England and Russia until 1698. Tsar Alexei was outraged by the Execution of Charles I of England in 1649, and expelled all English traders and residents from Russia in retaliation.

In 1697–1698 during the Grand Embassy of Peter I the Russian Tsar visited England for three months. He improved relations and learned the best new technology especially regarding ships and navigation.

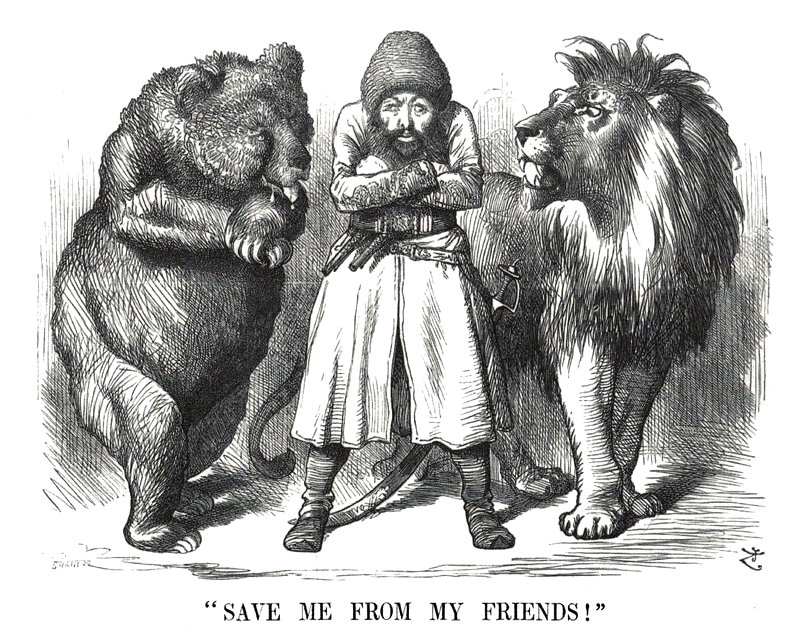
Russia depicted as a bear and Britain as a lion eying off an Afghan in the Great Game, 1878

The Kingdom of Great Britain (1707–1800) and later the United Kingdom of Great Britain and Ireland (1801–1922) had increasingly important ties with the Russian Empire (1721–1917), after Tsar Peter I brought Russia into European affairs and declared himself an emperor. From the 1720s Peter invited British engineers to Saint Petersburg, leading to the establishment of a small but commercially influential Anglo-Russian expatriate merchant community from 1730 to 1921. During the series of general European wars of the 18th century, the two empires found themselves as sometime allies and sometime enemies. The two states fought on the same side during War of the Austrian Succession (1740–48), but on opposite sides during Seven Years' War (1756–63), although did not at any time engage in the field.

==== Ochakov issue ====
Prime Minister William Pitt the Younger was alarmed at Russian expansion in Crimea in the 1780s at the expense of his Ottoman ally. He tried to get Parliamentary support for reversing it. In peace talks with the Ottomans, Russia refused to return the key Ochakov fortress. Pitt wanted to threaten military retaliation. However, Russia's ambassador Semyon Vorontsov organised Pitt's enemies and launched a public opinion campaign. Pitt won the vote so narrowly that he gave up and Vorontsov secured a renewal of the commercial treaty between Britain and Russia.

=== Napoleonic Wars: 1792–1817 ===
The outbreak of the French Revolution and its attendant wars temporarily united constitutionalist Britain and autocratic Russia in an ideological alliance against French republicanism. Britain and Russia attempted to halt the French but the failure of their joint invasion of the Netherlands in 1799 precipitated a change in attitudes.

Britain created Malta Protectorate in 1800, while the emperor Paul I of Russia was Grand Master of the Knights Hospitaller. That led to the never-executed Indian March of Paul, which was a secret project of a planned allied Russo-French expedition against the British possessions in India.

In 1805 both countries again attempted to combine operations with British expeditions to North Germany and Southern Italy in concert with Russian expeditionary corps were intended to create diversions in favour of Austria. However, several spectacular French victories in central Europe ended the Third Coalition.

Following the heavy Russian defeat at Friedland, Russia was obliged to enter Napoleon's Continental System, barring all trade with Britain. Subsequently, both countries entered into a state of limited war, the Anglo-Russian War (1807–1812), although neither side actively prosecuted operations against each other.

In 1812 Britain and Russia once again became allies against Napoleon in the Napoleonic Wars. The United Kingdom gave financial and material support to Russia during the French invasion in 1812, following which both countries pledged to keep 150,000 men in the field until Napoleon had been totally defeated. They both played major cooperative roles at the Congress of Vienna in 1814–1815 establishing a twenty-year alliance to guarantee European peace.

==== Eastern Question, Great Game, Russophobia ====
From 1820 to 1907, geopolitical disputes led to a gradual deterioration in Anglo-Russian relations. Popular sentiment in Britain turned increasingly hostile to Russia, with a high degree of anxiety for the safety of British rule in India. The result was a long-standing rivalry in Central Asia. In addition, there was a growing concern that Russia would destabilise Eastern Europe by its attacks on the faltering Ottoman Empire. This fear was known as the Eastern Question. Russia was especially interested in getting a warm water port that would enable its navy. Getting access out of the Black Sea into the Mediterranean was a goal, which meant access through the Straits controlled by the Ottomans.

Both intervened in the Greek War of Independence (1821–1829), eventually forcing the London peace treaty on the belligerents. The events heightened British Russophobia. In 1851 the Great Exhibition of the Works of Industry of All Nations held in London's Crystal Palace, including over 100,000 exhibits from forty nations. It was the world's first international exposition. Russia took the opportunity to dispel Russophobia in Britain by refuting stereotypes of Russia as a backward, militaristic repressive tyranny. Its sumptuous exhibits of luxury products and large 'objets d'art' with little in the way of advanced technology, however, did little to change its reputation. Britain considered its navy too weak to worry about, but saw its large army as a major threat.

The Russian pressures on the Ottoman Empire continued, leaving Britain and France to ally with the Ottomans and push back against Russia in the Crimean War (1853–1856). Russophobia was an element in generating popular support in Britain for the far-off conflict. Public opinion in Britain, especially among Whigs, supported Polish revolutionaries who were resisting Russian rule in Poland, after the November Uprising of 1830. The British government watched nervously as Saint Petersburg suppressed the subsequent Polish revolts in the early 1860s, yet refused to intervene.

London hosted the first Russian-language censorship-free periodicals — Polyarnaya Zvezda, Golosa iz Rossii, and Kolokol ("The Bell") — were published by Alexander Herzen and Nikolai Ogaryov in 1855–1865, which were of exceptional influence on Russian liberal intellectuals in the first several years of publication. The periodicals were published by the Free Russian Press set up by Herzen in 1853, on the eve of the Crimean War, financed by the funds Herzen had managed to expatriate from Russia with the help of his bankers, the Paris branch of the Rothschild family.

=== Hostile images and growing tensions ===
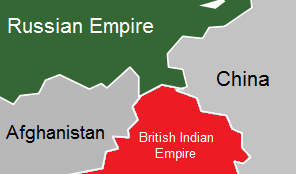
The narrow border between the Russian Empire and British India as of 1865, which eventually became buffered by Afghanistan's Wakhan Corridor

Russia's defeat in the Crimean War had been widely perceived by Russians as a humiliation and sharpened their desire for revenge. Tensions between the governments of Russia and Britain grew during the mid-century period. Since 1815 there had been an ideological cold war between reactionary Russia and liberal Britain. The Russians helped Austria brutally suppress the liberal Hungarian revolt during the Revolutions of 1848–49 to the dismay of the British. Russian leaders felt their nation's leniency in the 1820s allowed liberalism to spread in the West.

They deplored the liberal revolutions of 1830 in France, Belgium, central Europe; worst of all was the anti-Russian revolt that had to be crushed in Poland. New strategic and economic competition heightened tensions in the late 1850s, as the British moved into Asian markets. Russia's suppression of tribal revolts in the Caucasian region released troops for campaigns to expand Russian influence in central Asia, which the British interpreted as a long-term threat to the British Empire in India. There was strong hostility among British government officials to the repeated Russian threats to the Ottoman Empire with the goal of controlling the Dardanelles connecting the Black Sea and the Mediterranean Sea.

Beginning from the early 19th century, depictions of Russia in the British media, largely drawing on the reports of British travel writers and newspaper correspondents, frequently presented a "distorted picture" of the country; scholar Iwona Sawkowicz argues that this was due to the "brief visits" of these writers and correspondents, many of whom did not speak Russian and were "looking mostly for cultural differences." These depictions had the effect of increasing Russophobia in Britain despite growing economic and political ties between the two countries. In 1874, tension lessened as Queen Victoria's second son Prince Alfred married Tsar Alexander II's only daughter Grand Duchess Maria Alexandrovna, followed by a cordial state visit by the tsar. The goodwill lasted no more than three years, when structural forces again pushed the two nations to the verge of war.

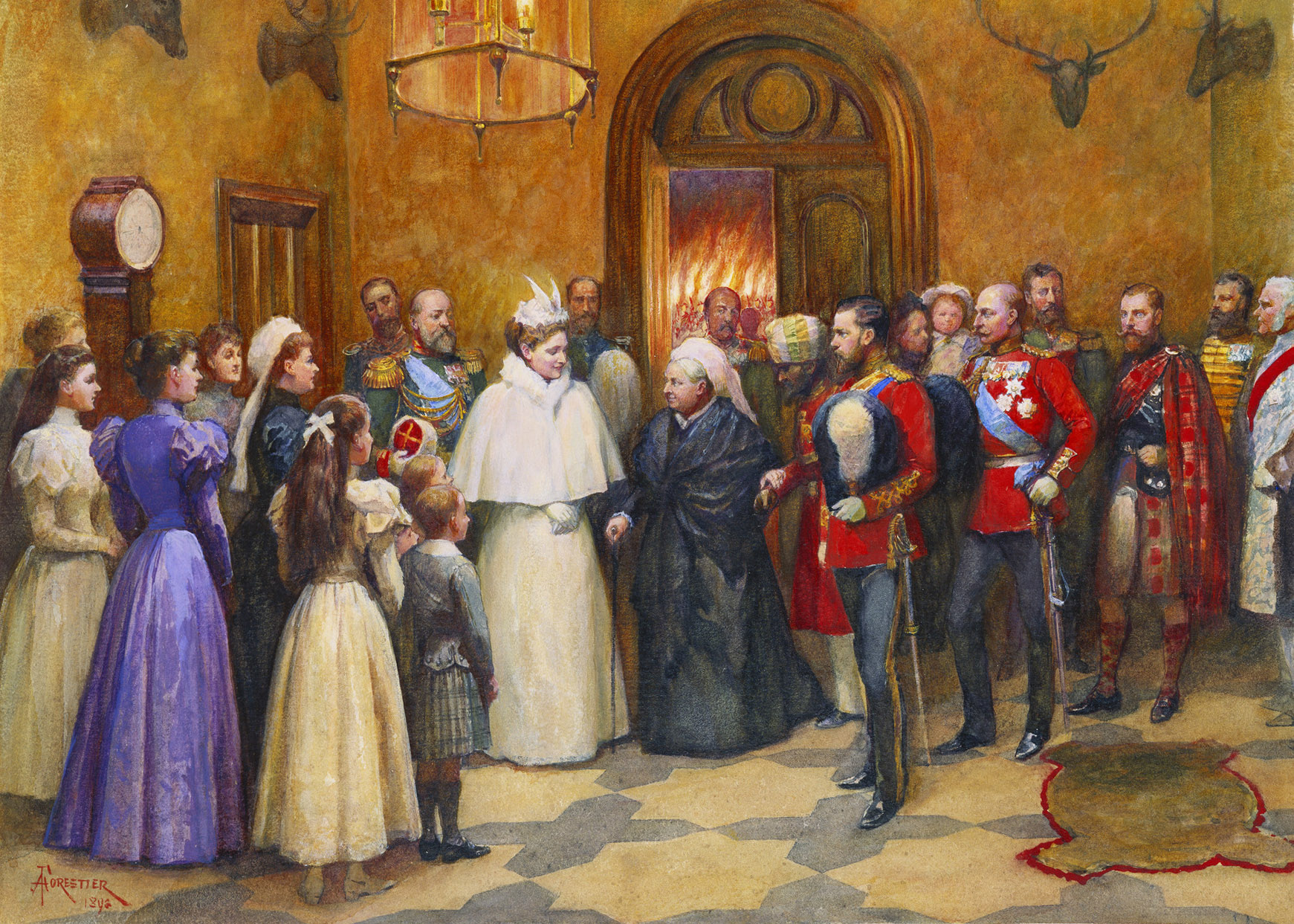
Queen Victoria and Tsar Nicholas II of Russia, Balmoral Castle in Scotland, 1896

==== Panjdeh incident 1885 ====
Anglo-Russian rivalries grew steadily over Central Asia during the so-called "Great Game" of the late 19th century. Russia desired warm-water ports on the Indian Ocean while Britain wanted to prevent Russian troops from gaining a potential invasion route to India. In 1885 Russia annexed part of Afghanistan in the Panjdeh incident, which caused a war scare. After nearly completing the Russian conquest of Central Asia (Russian Turkestan) the Russians captured an Afghan border fort. Seeing a threat to India, Britain came close to threatening war but both sides backed down and the matter was settled by diplomacy.

The effect was to stop further Russian expansion in Asia, except for the Pamir Mountains, and to define the north-western border of Afghanistan. However, Russia's foreign minister Nikolay Girs and his ambassador to London Baron de Staal in 1887 set up a buffer zone in Central Asia. Russian diplomacy thereby won grudging British acceptance of its expansionism. Persia was also an arena of tension, but without warfare.

==== Far East, 1860–1917 ====
Although Britain had serious disagreements with Russia regarding Russia's threat to the Ottoman Empire, and perhaps even to India, tensions were much lower in the Far East. London tried to maintain friendly relations in the 1860–1917 period and did reach a number of accommodations with Russia in northeastern Asia. Both nations were expanding in that direction. Russia built the Trans-Siberian Railway in the 1890s, and the British were expanding their large-scale commercial activities in China using Hong Kong, and the treaty ports of China. Russia sought a year-round port south of its main base in Vladivostok.

The key ingredient was that both nations were more fearful of Japanese plans than they were of each other; they both saw the need to collaborate. They cooperated with each other (and France) in forcing Japan to disgorge some of its gains after it won the First Sino-Japanese War of 1894. Russia increasingly became a protector of China against Japanese intentions. The Open Door policy promoted by the United States and Britain was designed to allow all nations on an equal footing to trade with China and was accepted by Russia. All the major powers collaborated in the Eight-Nation Alliance defending their diplomats during the Boxer Rebellion.

The British signed a military alliance with Japan in 1902, as well as an agreement with Russia in 1907 that resolved their major disputes. After Russia was defeated by Japan in 1905, those two countries work together on friendly terms to divide up Manchuria. Thus by 1910 the situation among the great powers in the Far East was generally peaceful with no troubles in sight. When the First World War broke out in 1914, Britain, Russia, Japan and China all declared war on Germany, and cooperated in defeating and dividing up its Imperial holdings.

At the same time, Russophilia flourished in Britain, founded on the popularity of Russian novelists such as Leo Tolstoy and Fyodor Dostoyevsky, and sympathetic views of Russian peasants.

Following the assassination of Tsar Alexander II in 1881, exiles from the radical Narodnaya Volya party and other opponents of Tsarism found their way to Britain. Sergei Stepniak and Felix Volkhovsky set up the Russian Free Press Fund, along with a journal, Free Russia, to generate support for reforms to, and abolition of, Russian autocracy. They were supported by liberal, nonconformist and left-wing Britons in the Society of Friends of Russian Freedom. There was also considerable support for victims of the Russian famine of 1891–2 and the Jewish and Christian victims of Tsarist persecution.

=== Early 20th century ===
There was cooperation in Asia, however, as Britain and Russia joined many others to protect their interests in China during the Boxer Rebellion (1899–1901).

Britain was an ally of Japan after 1902, but remained strictly neutral and did not participate in the Russo-Japanese War of 1904–5. However, there was a brief war scare in the Dogger Bank incident in October 1905 when the Imperial Russian Navy's Baltic Fleet, headed to the Pacific Ocean to fight the Imperial Japanese Navy, mistakenly engaged a number of British fishing vessels in the North Sea fog. The Russians thought they were Japanese torpedo boats, and sank one, killing three fishermen. The British public was angry but Russia apologised and damages were levied through arbitration.

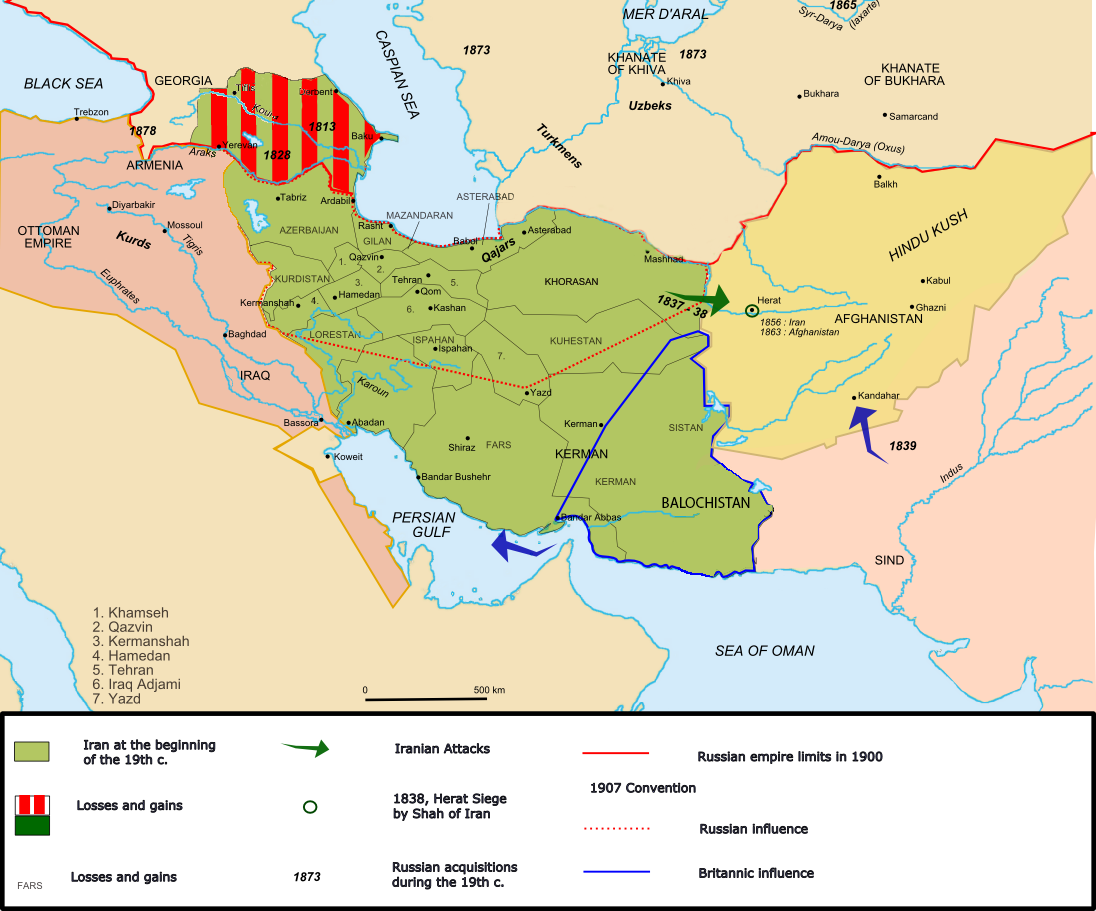
A map of southwest Asia, showing British and Russian areas of rule or influence in 1900

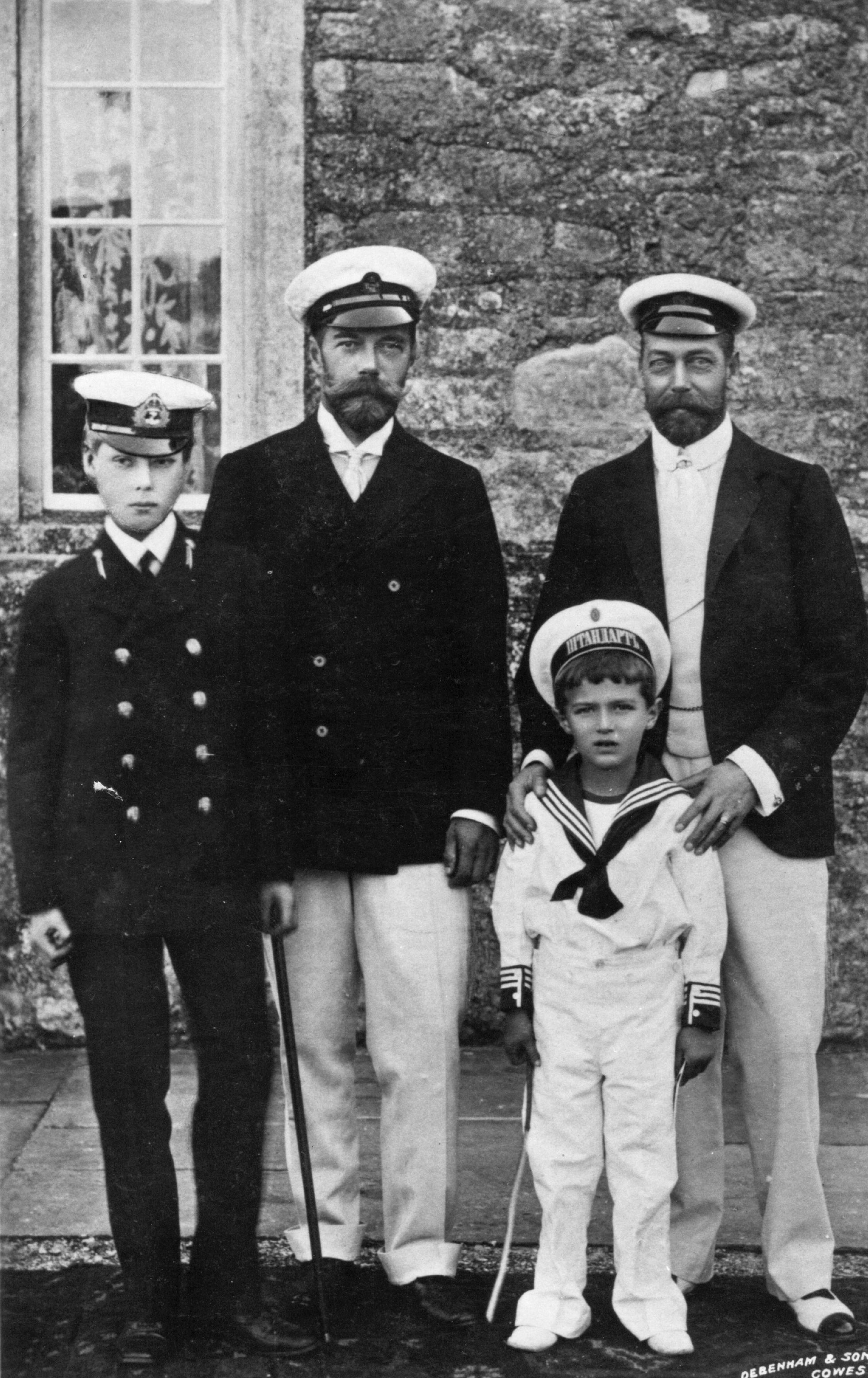
Emperor Nicholas II of Russia (left) and his cousin Prince George (later George V of the United Kingdom) with their sons, the future Edward VIII on the left and Alexei Nikolaevich, Tsarevich of Russia on the right; 1909

Diplomacy became delicate in the early 20th century. Russia was troubled by the Entente Cordiale between Great Britain and France signed in 1904. Russia and France already had a mutual defense agreement that said France was obliged to threaten Britain with an attack if Britain declared war on Russia, while Russia was to concentrate more than 300,000 troops on the Afghan border for an incursion into India in the event that Britain attacked France.

The solution was to bring Russia into the British-French alliance. The Anglo-Russian Entente and the Anglo-Russian Convention of 1907 made both countries part of the Triple Entente. The Convention was a formal treaty demarcating British and Russian spheres of influence in Central Asia. It enabled Britain to focus on the growing threat from Germany at sea and in central Europe.

The Convention ended the long-standing rivalry in central Asia, and then enabled the two countries to outflank the Germans, who were threatening to connect Berlin to Baghdad with a new railroad that would probably align the Turkish Empire with Germany. The Convention ended the long dispute over Persia. Britain promised to stay out of the northern half, while Russia recognised southern Persia as part of the British sphere of influence. Russia also promised to stay out of Tibet and Afghanistan. In exchange London extended loans and some political support. The Convention led to the formation of the Triple Entente.

==== Allies, 1907–1917 ====
Both countries were then part of the subsequent alliance against the Central Powers in World War I. In the summer of 1914, Austria-Hungary attacked Serbia, Russia promised to help Serbia, Germany promised to help Austria, and war broke out between Russia and Germany. France supported Russia. Under Foreign Minister Sir Edward Gray Britain felt its national interest would be badly hurt if Germany conquered Belgium and France. It was neutral until Germany suddenly invaded Belgium and France. Britain declared war becoming an ally of France and Russia against Germany and Austria.

The alliance lasted when the February 1917 Revolution in Russia overthrew Tsar Nicholas II and the Russian monarchy. However when the Bolsheviks under Vladimir Lenin took power in November, they made peace with Germany—the Treaty of Brest-Litovsk was in effect a surrender with massive loss of territory. Russia ended all diplomatic and trade relations with Britain, and repudiated all debts to London and Paris. The British supported the anti-Bolshevik forces during the Russian Civil War, but they lost, and Britain restored trade relations in 1921.

=== Soviet Union–United Kingdom relations ===
Soviet Union–United Kingdom relations
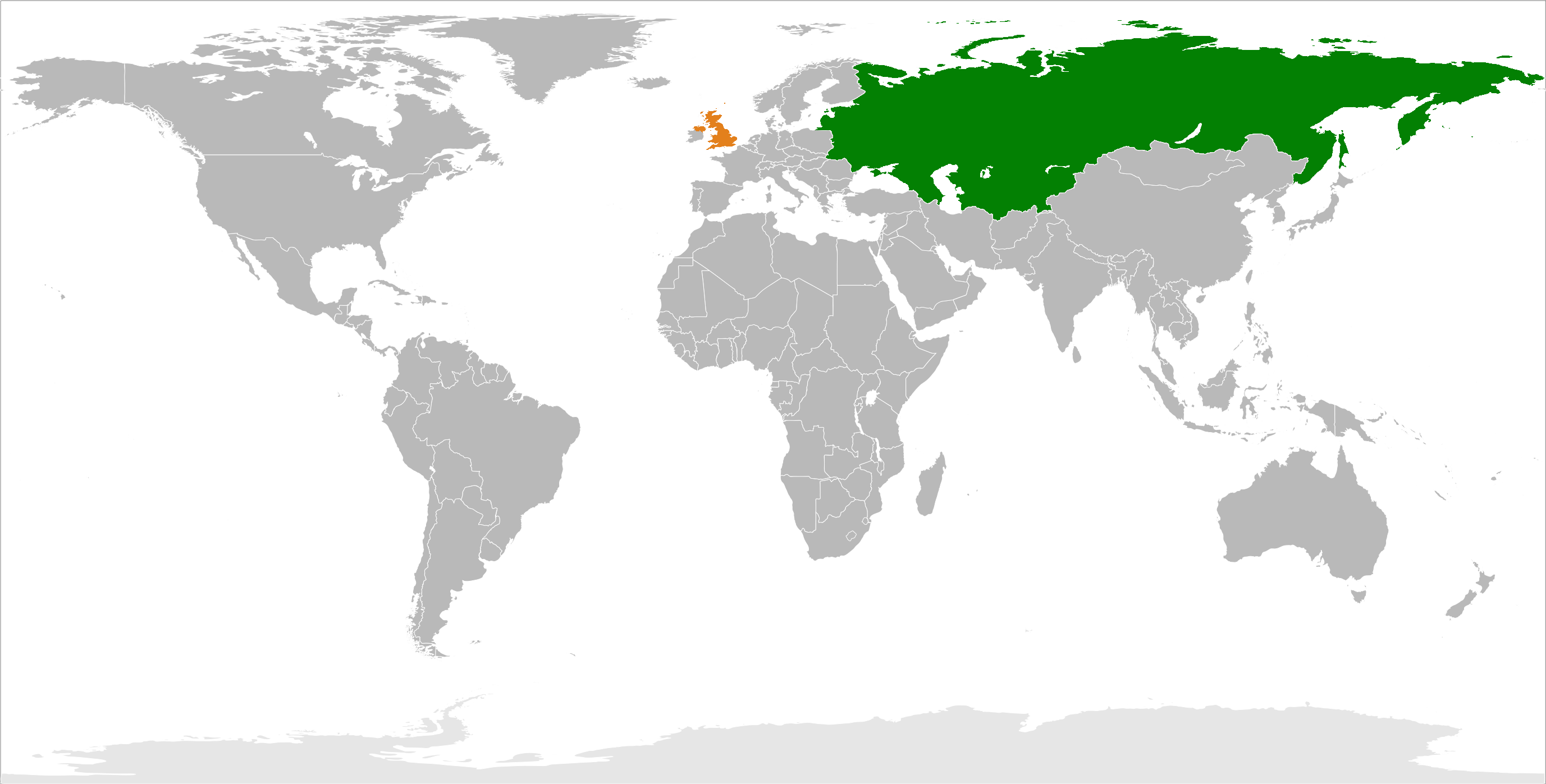

- Soviet Union: United Kingdom

==== Interwar period ====
In 1918, with the German Army advancing toward Moscow in Operation Faustschlag, the Russian Soviet Federative Socialist Republic under Lenin made many concessions to the German Empire in return for peace. The Allies felt betrayed by the Treaty of Brest Litovsk signed on 3 March 1918. Towards the end of World War I, Britain began to send troops to Russia to participate in the Allied intervention in the Russian Civil War which lasted up to 1925, aiming to topple the newly-formed socialist government the Bolsheviks had created. As late as 1920, Grigory Zinoviev called for a "holy war" against British imperialism at a rally in Baku.

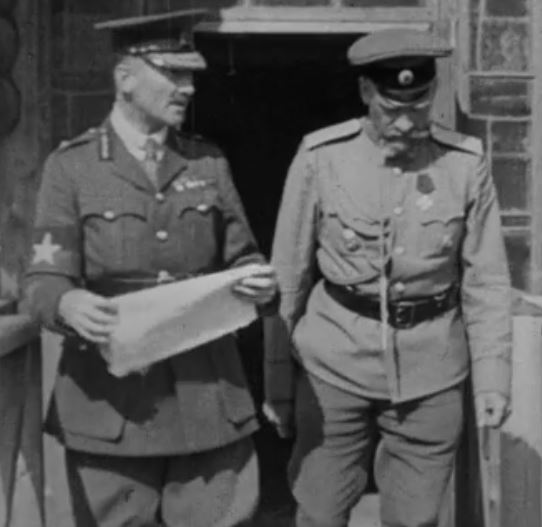
British major general Charles Maynard (left) with White Russian commander General Yevgeny Miller during the North Russia intervention in 1919.

Following the withdrawal of British troops from Russia, negotiations for trade began, and on 16 March 1921, the Anglo-Soviet Trade Agreement was concluded between the two countries. Lenin's New Economic Policy downplayed socialism and emphasised business dealings with capitalist countries, in an effort to restart the sluggish Russian economy. Britain was the first country to accept Lenin's offer of a trade agreement. It ended the British blockade, and Russian ports were opened to British ships. Both sides agreed to refrain from hostile propaganda. It amounted to de facto diplomatic recognition and opened a period of extensive trade.

Britain formally recognised the Union of Soviet Socialist Republics (USSR or Soviet Union, 1922–1991) on 1 February 1924. However, Anglo-Soviet relations were still marked by distrust and contention, culminating in a diplomatic break in 1927. Diplomatic relations between the two countries were severed at the end of May 1927 after a police raid on the All Russian Co-operative Society whereafter Conservative British prime minister Stanley Baldwin presented the House of Commons with deciphered Soviet telegrams that proved Soviet espionage activities. The fallout from this incident contributed to the Soviet war scare of 1927, as it led to a domestic Soviet fear of an invasion, although the fear is generally considered by historians to have been created by Joseph Stalin to use against his opponents in the Left Opposition. After the 1929 general election, the incoming Labour government of Ramsay MacDonald successfully established permanent diplomatic relations.

==== Second World War ====
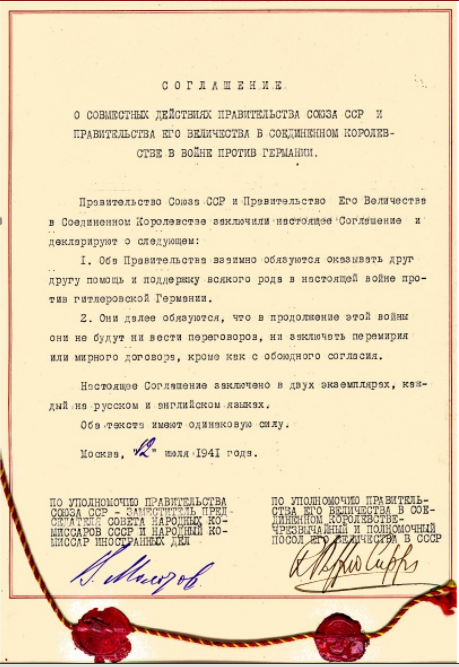
1941 Soviet–UK agreement against Germany

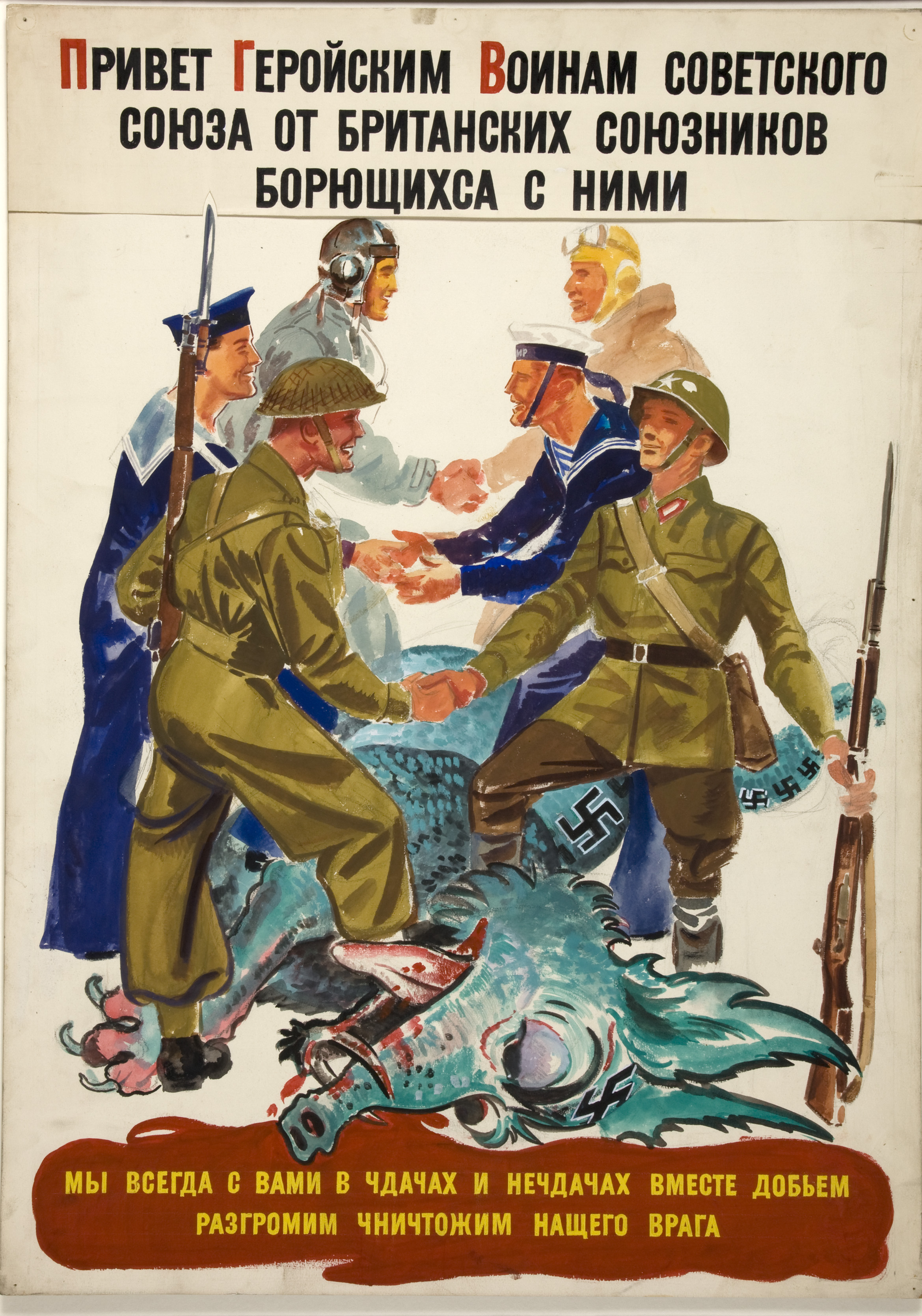
British and Soviet servicemen over body of swastikaed dragon

In 1938, Britain and France negotiated the Munich Agreement with Nazi Germany. Stalin opposed the pact and refused to recognise the German annexation of the Czechoslovak Sudetenland.

===== German-Soviet Non-aggression Pact =====
The USSR and Germany signed the Non-aggression Pact in late August 1939, which promised the Soviets control of about half of Eastern Europe, and removed the risk to Germany of a two-front war. Germany invaded Poland on 1 September, and the Soviets followed sixteen days later. Many members of the Communist Party in Britain and sympathisers were outraged and quit. Those who remained strove to undermine the British war effort and campaigned for what the party called a 'people's peace', i.e. a negotiated settlement with Hitler. Britain, along with France, declared war on Germany, but not the USSR. The British people were sympathetic to Finland in its Winter War against the USSR. The USSR furthermore supplied oil to the Germans which Hitler's Luftwaffe needed in its Blitz against Britain in 1940.

===== Anglo-Soviet alliance =====
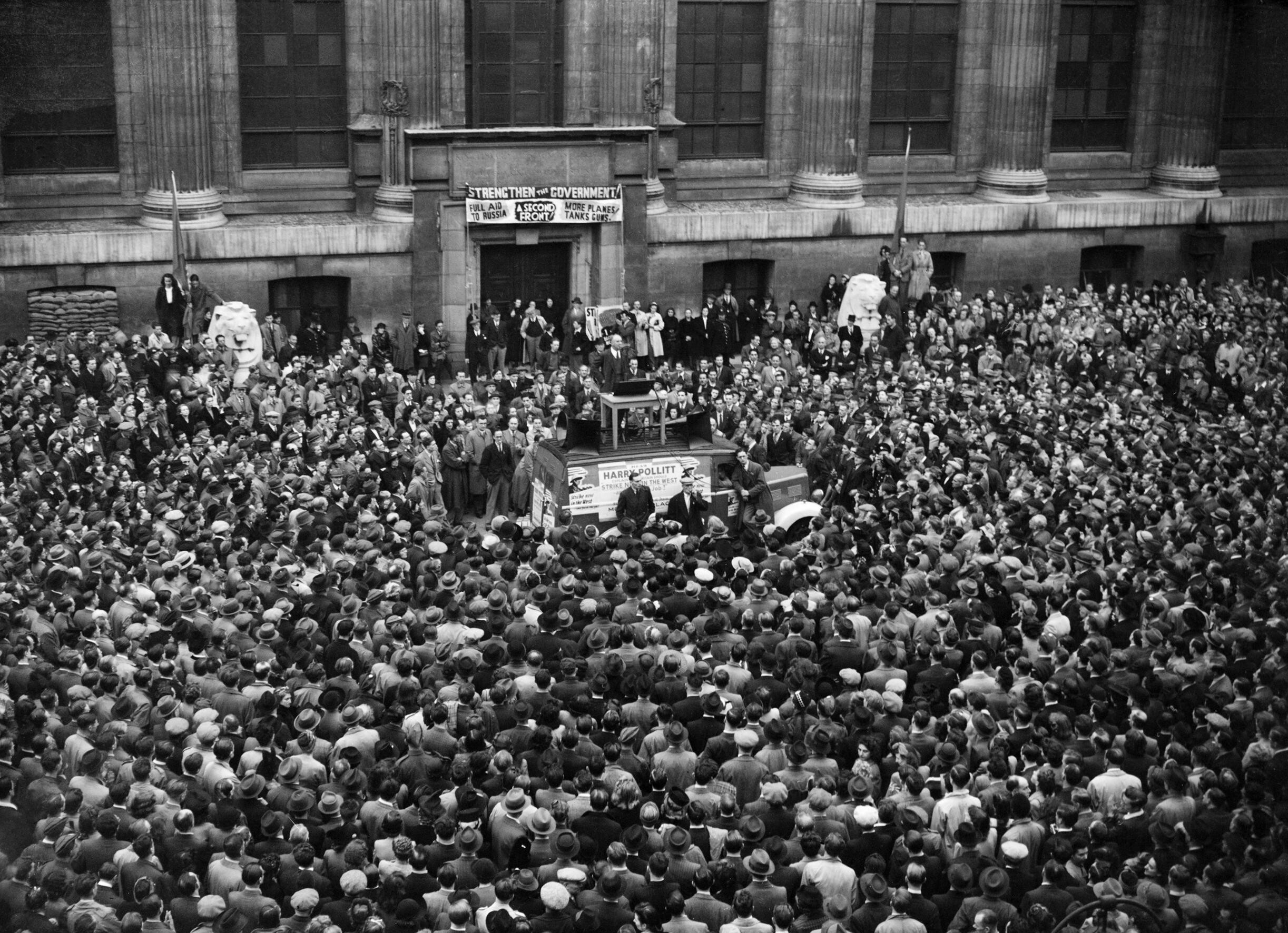
Rally in London in support of the Soviet Union, 1941

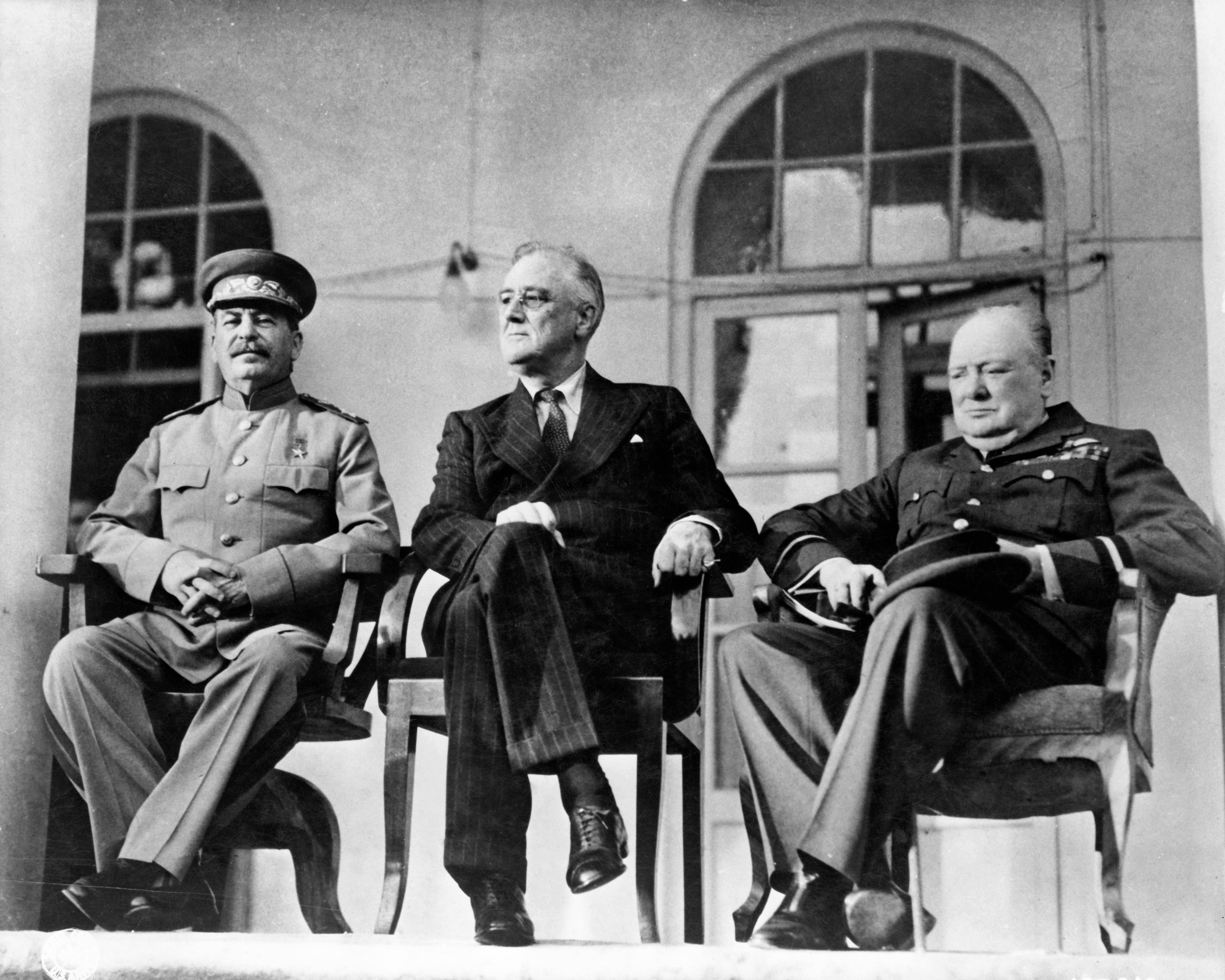
Joseph Stalin, Franklin D. Roosevelt and Winston Churchill on the verandah of the Soviet Embassy in Tehran during the Tehran Conference, 1943

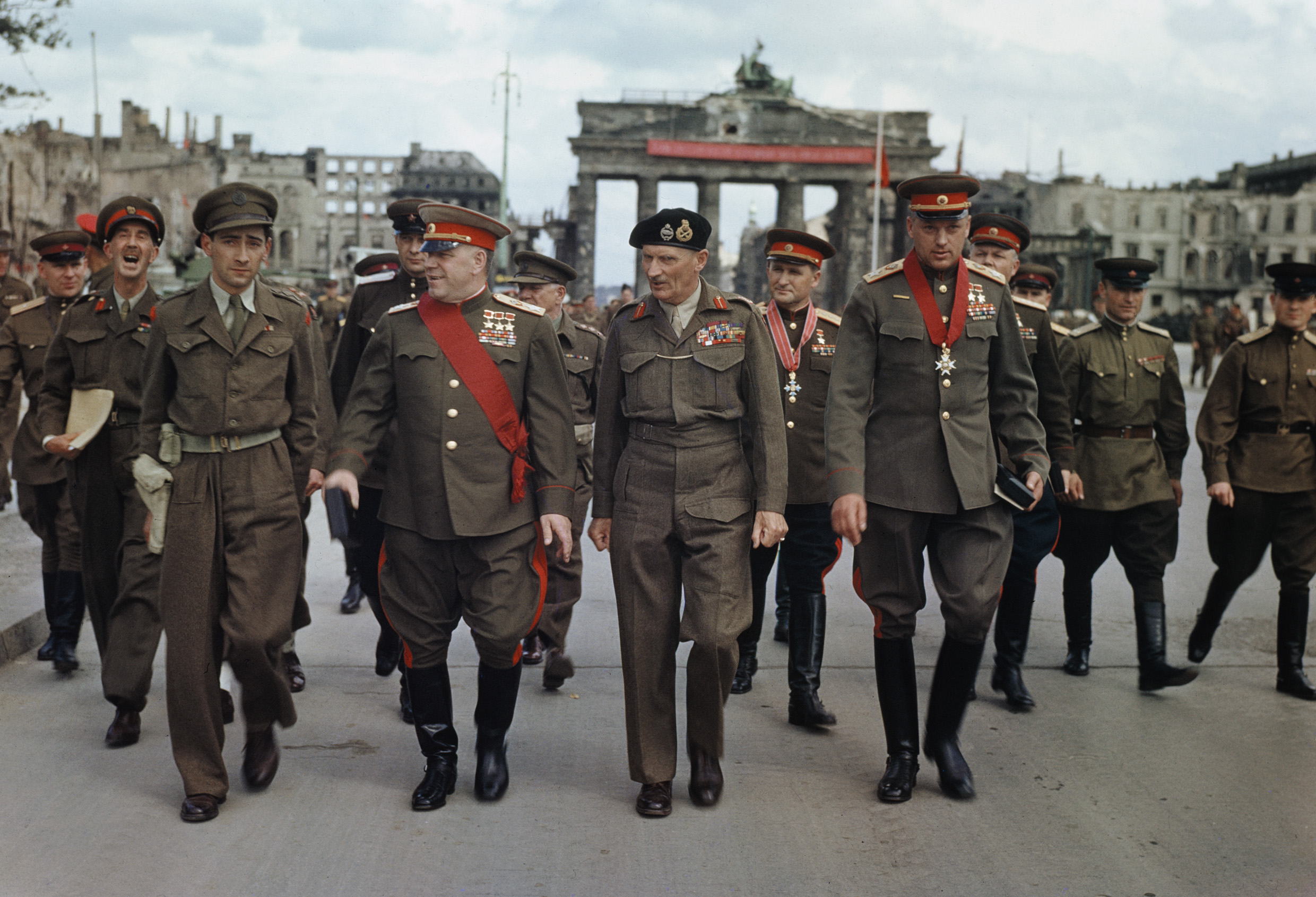
Field Marshal Montgomery and the Soviet General Georgy Zhukov at the Brandenburg Gate in Berlin, Germany, 12 July 1945

In June 1941, Germany launched Operation Barbarossa, attacking the USSR. Britain and the USSR agreed an alliance the following month with the Anglo-Soviet Agreement. The Anglo-Soviet invasion of Iran in August overthrew Reza Shah and secured the oil fields in Iran from falling into Axis hands. The Arctic convoys transported supplies between Britain and the USSR during the war. Britain was quick to provide limited materiel aid to the Soviet Union – including tanks and aircraft – via these convoys in order to try to keep her new ally in the war against Germany and her allies.

One major conduit for supplies was through Iran. The two nations agreed on a joint occupation of Iran, to neutralise German influence. After the war, there were disputes about the Soviet delayed departure from Iran, and speculation that it planned to set up a puppet state along its border. That problem was resolved completely in 1946. The Soviet Union joined the Second Inter-Allied Meeting in London in September. The USSR thereafter became one of the "Big Three" Allies of World War II along with Britain and, from December, the United States, fighting against the Axis powers.

A twenty-year mutual assistance agreement, the Anglo-Soviet Treaty was signed in May 1942, reasserting the military alliance until the end of the war and formalizing a political alliance between the Soviet Union and the British Empire for 20 years.

In August 1942, Winston Churchill, accompanied by American W. Averell Harriman, went to Moscow and met Stalin for the first time. The British were nervous that Stalin and Hitler might make separate peace terms; Stalin insisted that would not happen. Churchill explained how Arctic convoys bringing munitions to Russia had been intercepted by the Germans; there was a delay now so that future convoys would be better protected. He apologetically explained there would be no second front this year—no British-American invasion of France—which Stalin had been urgently requesting for months. The will was there, said Churchill, but there was not enough American troops, not enough tanks, not enough shipping, not enough air superiority. Instead the British, and soon the Americans, would step up bombing of German cities and railways. Furthermore, there would be "Operation Torch" in November. It would be a major Anglo-American invasion of North Africa, which would set the stage for an invasion of Italy and perhaps open the Mediterranean for munitions shipments to Russia through the Black Sea. The talks started out on a very sour note but after many hours of informal conversations, the two men understood each other and knew they could cooperate smoothly.

===== Polish boundaries =====
Stalin was adamant about British support for new boundaries for Poland, and Britain went along. They agreed that after victory Poland's boundaries would be moved westward, so that the USSR took over lands in the east while Poland gained lands in the west that had been under German control.

Lighter blue line: Curzon Line "B" as proposed in 1919. Darker blue line: "Curzon" Line "A" as proposed by the Soviet Union in 1940. Pink areas: Former pre WWII provinces of Germany transferred to Poland after the war. Grey area: Pre WWII Polish territory east of the Curzon Line annexed by the Soviet Union after the war.

They agreed on the "Curzon Line" as the boundary between Poland and the Soviet Union and the Oder-Neisse line would become the new boundary between Germany and Poland. The proposed changes angered the Polish government in exile in London, which did not want to lose control over its minorities. Churchill was convinced that the only way to alleviate tensions between the two populations was the transfer of people, to match the national borders. As he told Parliament on 15 December 1944, "Expulsion is the method which... will be the most satisfactory and lasting. There will be no mixture of populations to cause endless trouble.... A clean sweep will be made."

===== Postwar plans =====
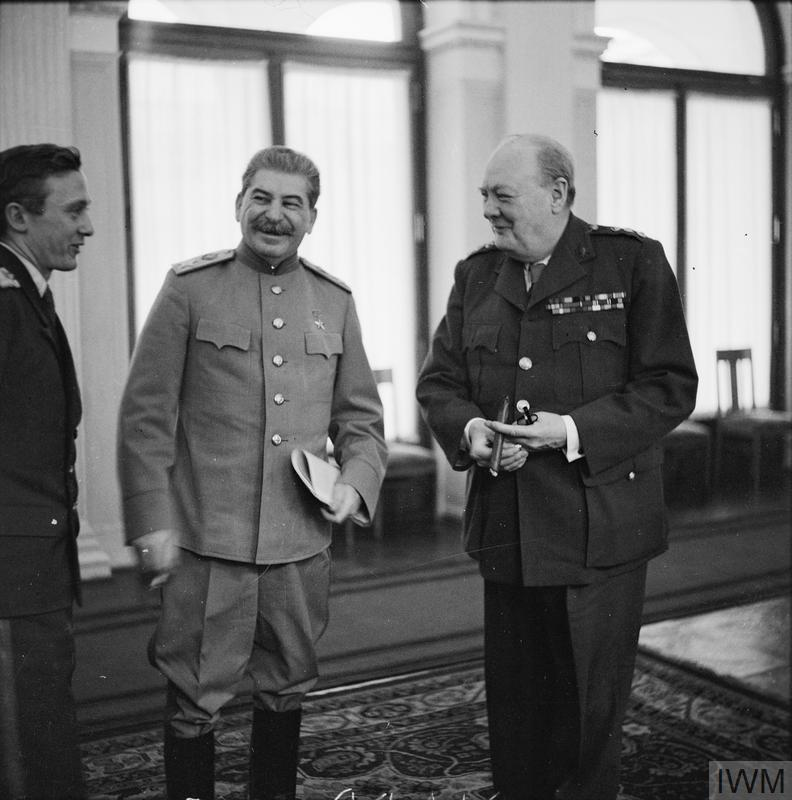
U.K. Prime Minister Winston Churchill with Joseph Stalin in 1945.

The U.S. and Britain each approached Moscow in its own way; there was little coordination. Churchill wanted specific, pragmatic deals, typified by the percentage arrangement. Roosevelt's highest priority was to have the Soviets eagerly and energetically participate in the new United Nations, and he also wanted them to enter the war against Japan.

In October 1944, Churchill and foreign minister Anthony Eden met Stalin and his foreign minister Vyacheslav Molotov in Moscow. They discussed who would control what in the rest of postwar Eastern Europe. The Americans were not present, were not given shares, and were not fully informed. After lengthy bargaining the two sides settled on a long-term plan for the division of the region, the plan was to give 90% of the influence in Greece to Britain and 90% in Romania to Russia. Russia gained an 80%/20% division in Bulgaria and Hungary. There was a 50/50 division in Yugoslavia.

==== Cold War and beyond ====
Following the end of the Second World War, relations between the Soviet Bloc and the Western Bloc deteriorated quickly. Former British prime minister Churchill claimed that the Soviet occupation of Eastern Europe after World War II amounted to 'an iron curtain has descended across the continent.' Relations were generally tense during the ensuing Cold War, typified by spying and other covert activities. The British and American Venona Project was established in 1942 for cryptanalysis of messages sent by Soviet intelligence. Soviet spies were later discovered in Britain, such as Kim Philby and the Cambridge Five spy ring, which was operating in England until 1963.

The Soviet spy agency, the KGB, was suspected of the murder of Georgi Markov in London in 1978. A High ranking KGB official, Oleg Gordievsky, defected to London in 1985.

British prime minister Margaret Thatcher pursued a strong anti-communist policy in concert with Ronald Reagan during the 1980s, in contrast with the détente policy of the 1970s. During the Soviet–Afghan War the British conducted covert military support as well as sending arms and supplies to the Afghan Mujahideen.

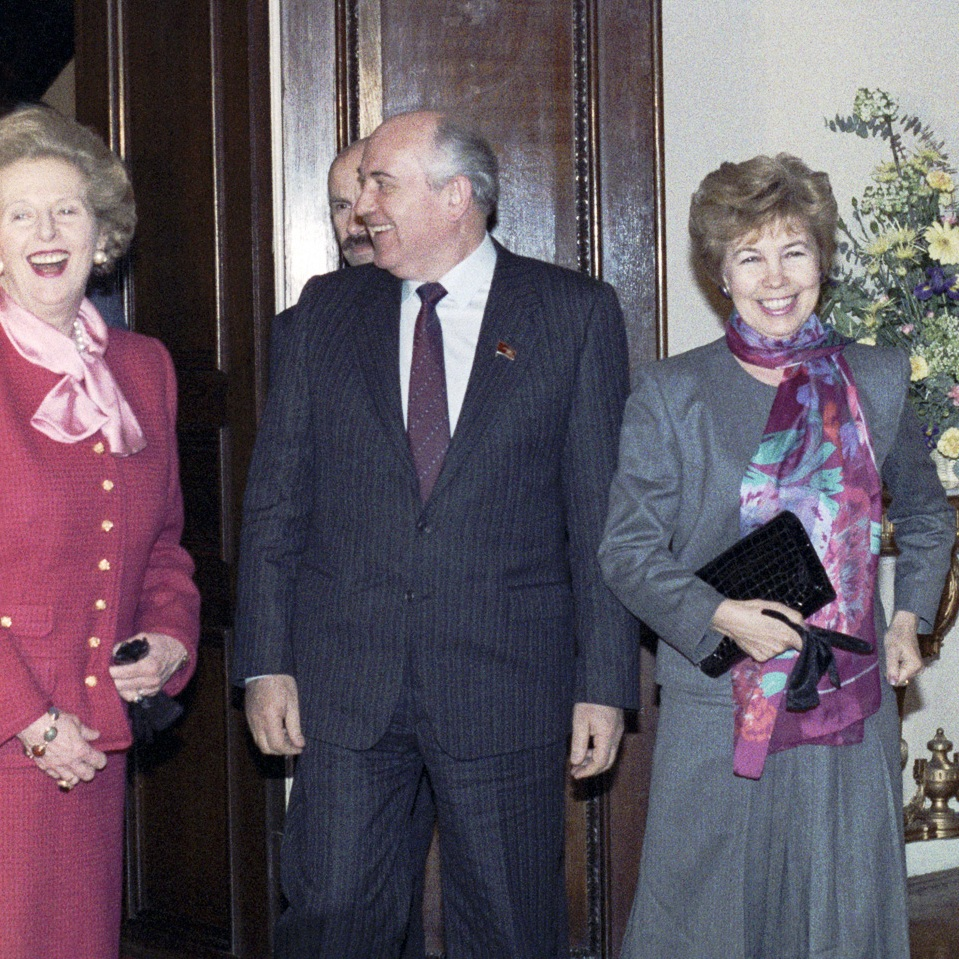
Mikhail Gorbachev and Margaret Thatcher at the Soviet Embassy in London, 1 April 1989

Relations improved considerably after Mikhail Gorbachev came to power in the Soviet Union in 1985 and launched perestroika. They remained relatively warm after the collapse of the USSR in 1991 – with Russia taking over the international obligations and status from the demised superpower.

In October 1994, Queen Elizabeth II made a state visit to Russia, the first time a ruling British monarch had set foot on Russian soil.

==== The United Kingdom's relations with other former the Post-Soviet states ====
- Armenia
- Azerbaijan
- Belarus
- Estonia
- (Georgia (country)) Georgia
- Kazakhstan
- Kyrgyzstan
- Latvia
- Lithuania
- Moldova
- Tajikistan
- Turkmenistan
- Ukraine
- Uzbekistan

=== 21st century ===
==== 2000s ====
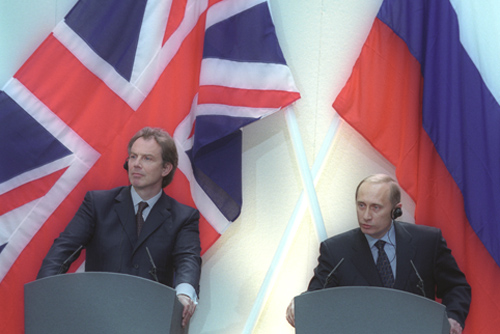
Tony Blair and Vladimir Putin, 2000

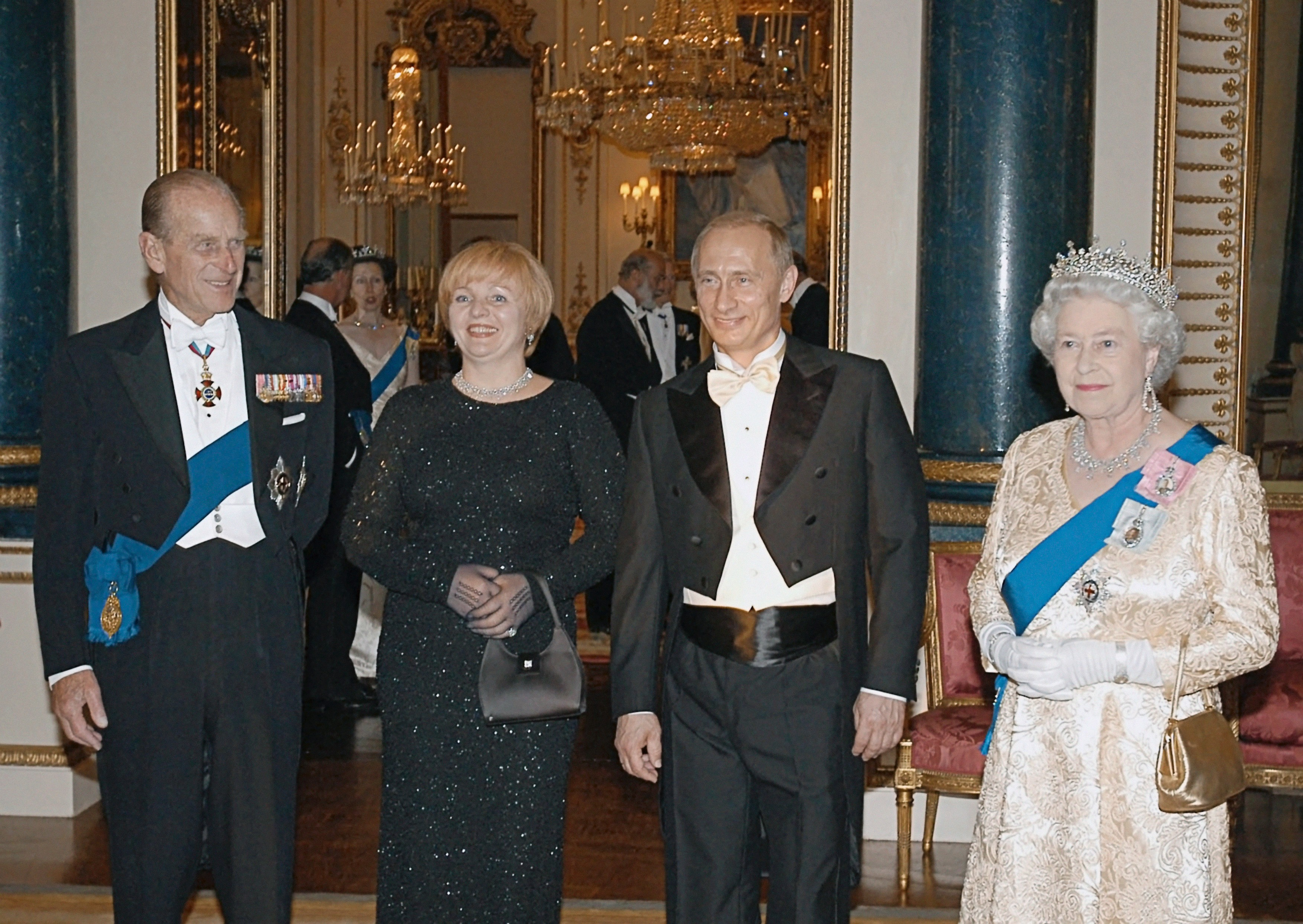
President Vladimir Putin and his wife Lyudmila with Queen Elizabeth II and Prince Philip on a state visit, 2003

Relations between the countries began to grow tense again shortly after Vladimir Putin was elected as President of the Russian Federation in 2000, with the Kremlin pursuing a more assertive foreign policy and imposing more controls domestically. The major irritant in the early-2000s was the UK's refusal to extradite Russian citizens, self-exiled businessman Boris Berezovsky and Chechen separatist leader Akhmed Zakayev, whom the UK granted political asylum.

In late 2006, former FSB officer Alexander Litvinenko was poisoned in London by radioactive metalloid, Polonium-210 and died three weeks later. The UK requested the extradition of Andrei Lugovoy from Russia to face charges over Litvinenko's death. Russia refused, stating their constitution does not allow extradition of their citizens to foreign countries. As a result of this, the United Kingdom expelled four Russian diplomats, shortly followed by Russia expelling four British diplomats. The Litvinenko affair remains a major irritant in British-Russian relations. In the aftermath of the Litvinenko poisoning, the UK's special security service agencies, MI5 and MI6 severed their relations, and co-operation with Russia's special security agency the FSB.

In July 2007, the Crown Prosecution Service announced that Boris Berezovsky would not face charges in the UK for talking to The Guardian about plotting a "revolution" in his homeland. Kremlin officials called it a "disturbing moment" in Anglo-Russian relations. Berezovsky remained a wanted man in Russia until his death in March 2013; having been accused of embezzlement and money laundering.

Russia re-commenced long range air patrols of the Tupolev Tu-95 bomber aircraft in August 2007. These patrols neared British airspace, requiring RAF fighter jets to "scramble" and intercept them.

In January 2008, Russia ordered two offices of the British Council situated in Russia to shut down, accusing them of tax violations. Eventually, work was suspended at the offices, with the council citing "intimidation" by the Russian authorities as the reason. However, later in the year a Moscow court threw out most of the tax claims made against the British Council, ruling them invalid.

During the 2008 South Ossetia war between Russia and Georgia, then-UK foreign secretary, David Miliband, visited the Georgian capital city of Tbilisi to meet with the Georgian President and said the UK's government and people "stood in solidarity" with the Georgian people.

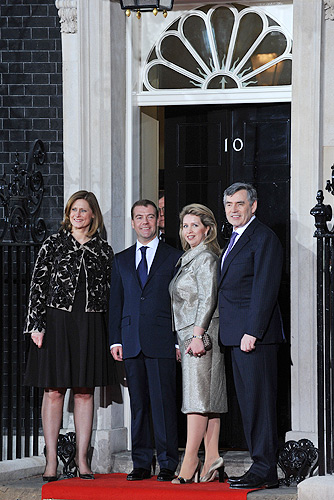
UK prime minister Gordon Brown and Russian president Dmitry Medvedev with their spouses at 10 Downing Street, on 1 April 2009

Earlier in 2009, then solicitor-general, Vera Baird, personally decided that the property of the Russian Orthodox Church in the United Kingdom, which had been the subject of a legal dispute following the decision of the administering Bishop and half its clergy and lay adherents to move to the jurisdiction of the Ecumenical Patriarchate, would have to remain with the Moscow Patriarchate. She was forced to reassure concerned Members of Parliament that her decision had been made only on legal grounds, and that diplomatic and foreign policy questions had played no part. Baird's determination of the case was however endorsed by the attorney-general Baroness Patricia Scotland. It attracted much criticism. However, questions continue to be raised that Baird's decision was designed not to offend the Putin government in Russia.

In November 2009, David Miliband visited Russia and described the state of relations between the two countries as "respectful disagreement".

Meanwhile, both the UK and Russia declassified a large amount of contemporary material from the highest levels of the political power. In 2004, Alexander Fursenko of the Russian Academy of Sciences (RAS) and Odd Arne Westad of the London School of Economics started a project to disclose British–Soviet relations during the Cold War. Four years, the project's direction passed to the historian Alexandr Chubarian, also a member of the RAS, who in 2016 completed the documentation covering from 1943 to 1953.

==== 2010s ====
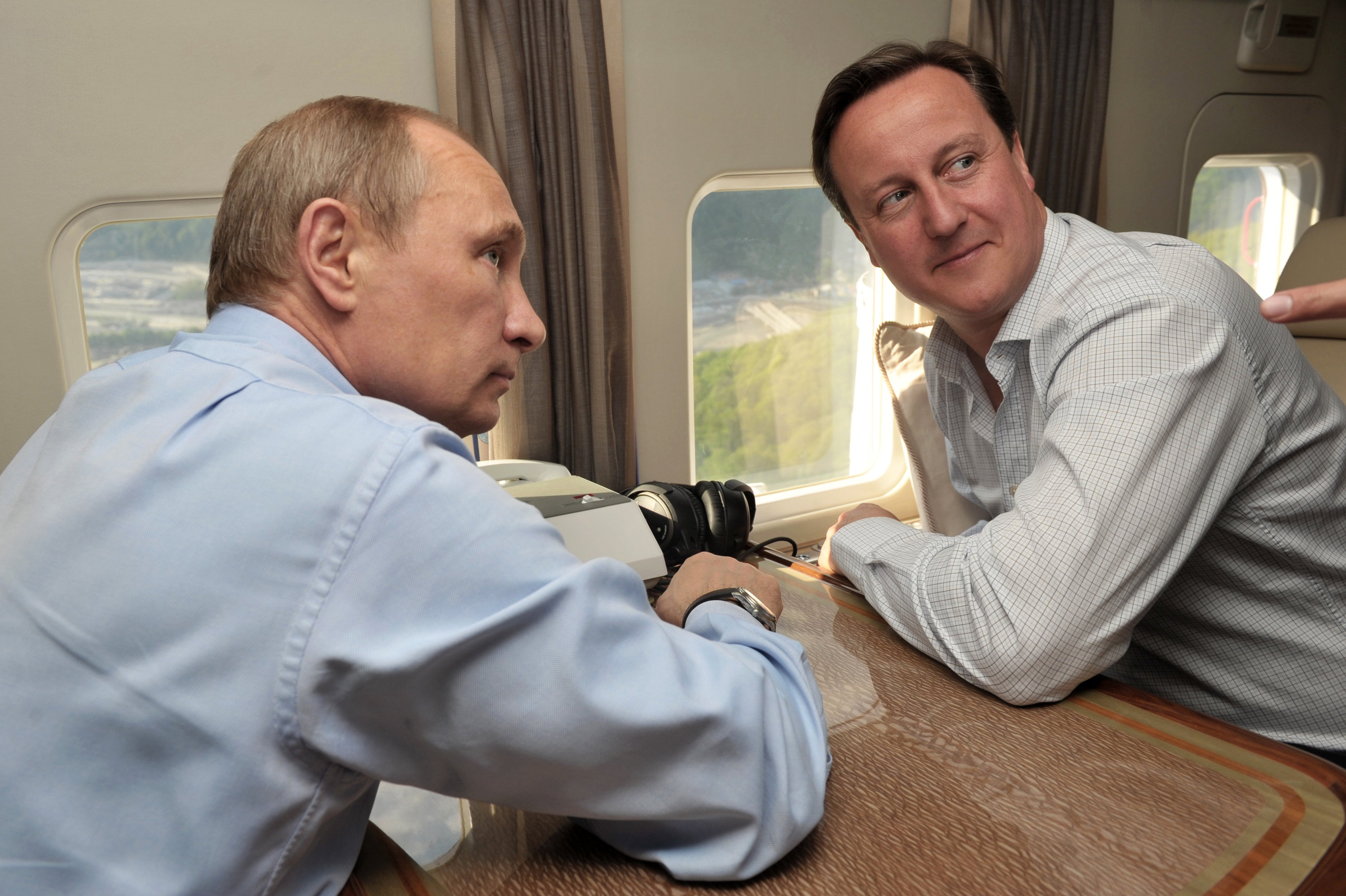
UK prime minister David Cameron and Russian president Vladimir Putin in Sochi, Russia, on 10 May 2013

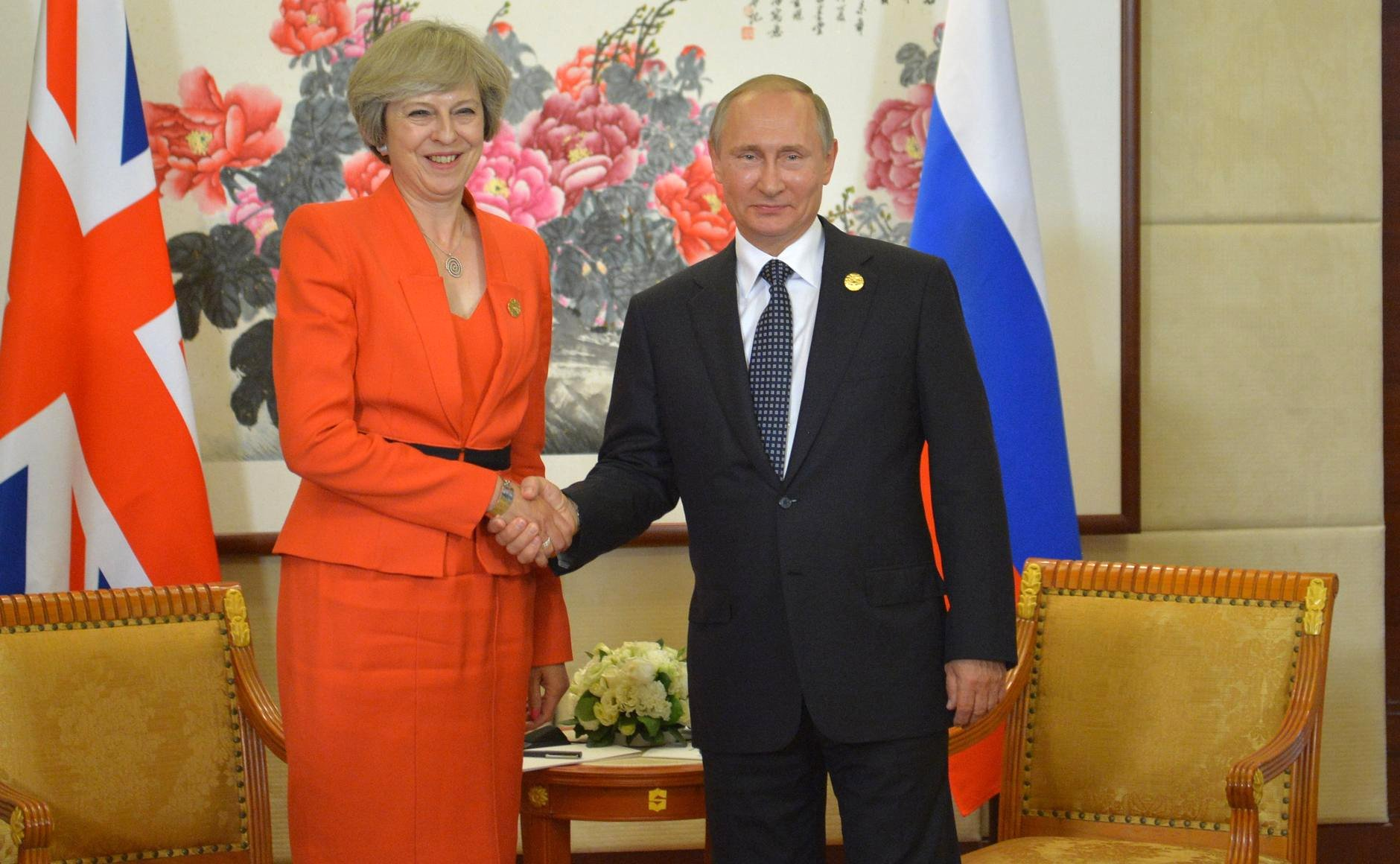
UK prime minister Theresa May and Russian president Vladimir Putin at a meeting during the G20 summit in Hangzhou, China, on 4 September 2016

In the years after David Cameron became UK prime minister, UK-Russia relations initially showed a marked improvement. In 2011, Cameron visited Russia, and in 2012, Putin visited the UK for the first time in seven years, holding talks with Cameron, and also visiting the 2012 London Olympics together.

In May 2013, Cameron flew to meet Putin at his summer residence in Sochi, Bocharov Ruchei, to hold talks on the Syria crisis. Cameron described the talks as "very substantive, purposeful and useful", and the leaders exchanged presents with each other. Cameron emphasised the 'commonalities between the two countries', and renewed cooperation between the countries' security services for the 2014 Sochi Olympics. Cameron stated at this time that a more effective relationship between the UK and Russia would "make people in both our countries safer and better off". At that time, it was suggested that Cameron could use his good relations with both US president Barack Obama, and President Putin to act as a 'go-between' in international relations.

In 2014, relations soured drastically following the Russo-Ukrainian War, with the British government, along with the United States and the European Union, imposing punitive sanctions on Russia. Cameron criticised the 2014 Crimean status referendum as a "sham", with voters having "voted under the barrel of a kalashnikov", stating "Russia has sought to annex Crimea.... This is a flagrant breach of international law and something we will not recognise." In March 2014, the UK suspended all military cooperation with Russia and halted all extant licences for direct military export to Russia. In September 2014, there were more rounds of sanctions imposed by the EU, targeted at Russian banking and oil industries, and at high officials. Russia responded by cutting off food imports from the UK and other countries imposing sanctions. UK prime minister David Cameron and U.S. president Barack Obama jointly wrote for The Times in early September: "Russia has ripped up the rulebook with its illegal, self-declared annexation of Crimea and its troops on Ukrainian soil threatening and undermining a sovereign nation state."

In 2016, 52% of British people decided to vote in favour for the country's exit from the European Union, which was known as Brexit. As shockwave were sent across the country, both Cameron and British officials accused Russia of meddling the vote. Future British prime minister, Boris Johnson, was accused of being a Russian stooge and underestimating Russian interference.

According to an Intelligence and security committee report the British government and intelligence agencies failed to conduct any proper assessment of Kremlin attempts to interfere with the Brexit referendum.

In early 2017, during her meeting with U.S. president Donald Trump, the UK prime minister Theresa May appeared to take a line harsher than that of the U.S. on the Russian sanctions. In April 2017, Moscow's ambassador to the UK Alexander Yakovenko strongly criticised the UK for "raising tensions in Europe" by deploying 800 troops to Estonia. Yakovenko stated that UK-Russia relations were at an "all-time low", adding that there was no longer any "bilateral relationship of substance" between the countries.

In mid-November 2017, in her Guildhall speech at the Lord Mayor's Banquet, prime minister May called Russia "chief among those today, of course" who sought to undermine the "open economies and free societies" Britain was committed to, according to her. She went on to elaborate: "[Russia] is seeking to weaponise information. Deploying its state-run media organisations to plant fake stories and photo-shopped images in an attempt to sow discord in the West and undermine our institutions. So I have a very simple message for Russia. We know what you are doing. And you will not succeed." In response, Russian parliamentarians said Theresa May was "making a fool of herself" with a "counterproductive" speech; Russia's embassy reacted to the speech by posting a photograph of her from the Banquet drinking a glass of wine, with the tweet: "Dear Theresa, we hope, one day you will try Crimean #Massandra red wine". Theresa May's Banquet speech was compared by some Russian commentators to Winston Churchill's Iron Curtain speech in Fulton in March 1946; it was hailed by Andrew Rosenthal in a front-page article run by The New York Times that contrasted May's message against some statements about Putin made by Donald Trump, who, according to Rosenthal, "far from denouncing Putin's continuous assaults on human rights and free speech in Russia, [...] praised [Putin] as being a better leader than Obama."

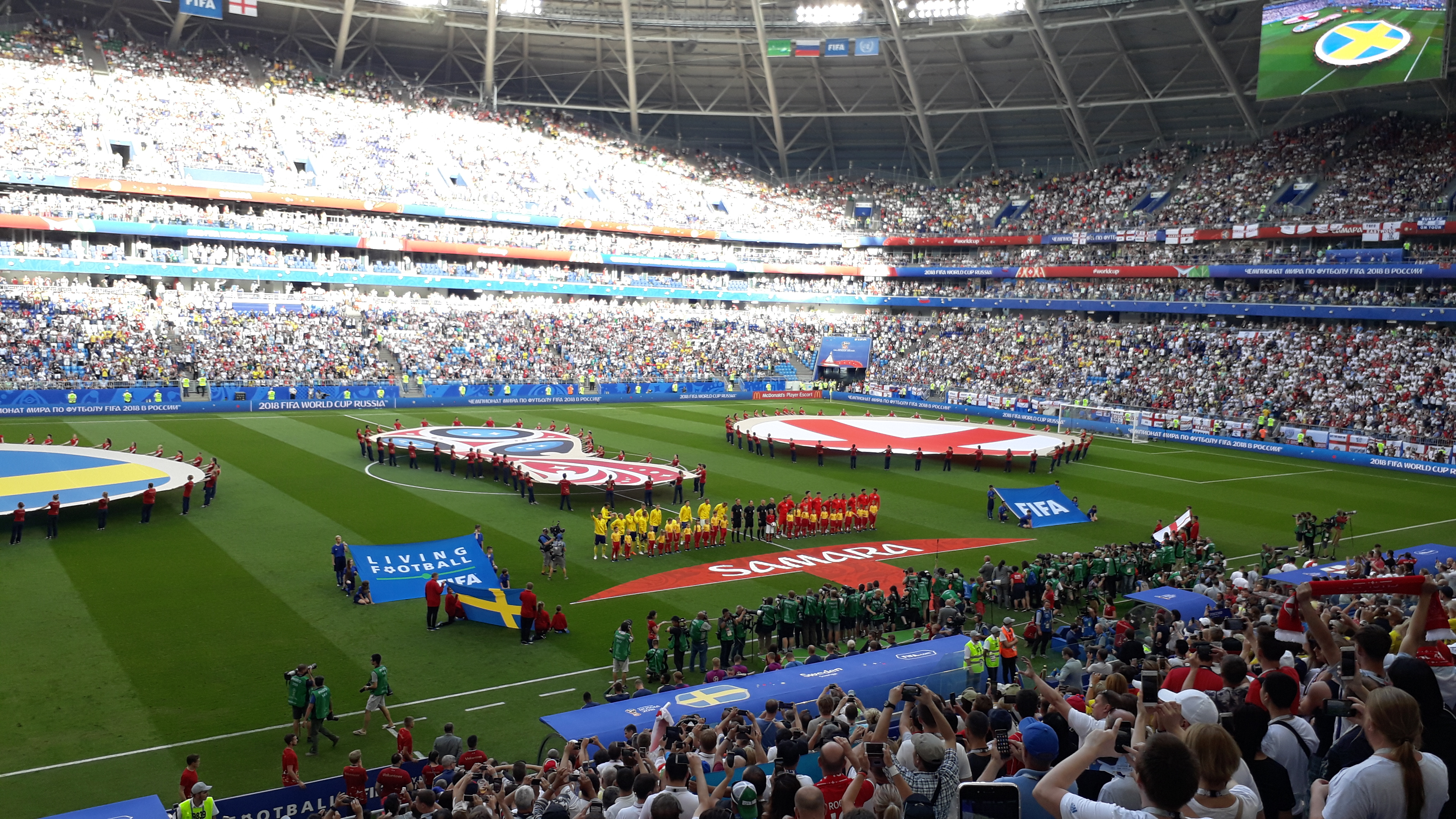
England's squad against Sweden at the 2018 FIFA World Cup in Russia, on 7 July 2018

In December 2017, Boris Johnson became the first UK foreign secretary to visit Russia in five years. Johnson said that UK-Russia relations were "not on a good footing" but he "wanted them to improve", after talks in Moscow. Russia's foreign minister Sergei Lavrov accused the UK of making "insulting" statements ahead of the meeting, adding that it was "no secret that Britain's relations with Russia were at a 'low point'", but said he "trusted Mr Johnson" and the two countries had agreed on the need to work together on the UN Security Council.

In March 2018, as a result of the poisoning of Sergei and Yulia Skripal in Salisbury, relations between the countries deteriorated still further, both countries expelling 23 diplomats each and taking other punitive measures against one another. Within days of the incident, the UK government's assessment that it was "highly likely" that the Russian state was responsible for the incident received the backing of the EU, the US, and Britain's other allies. In what then Foreign Secretary Boris Johnson called an "extraordinary international response" on the part of the UK's allies, on 26 and 27 March 2018 there followed a concerted action by the U.S., most EU member states, Albania, Australia, Canada, Macedonia, Moldova, and Norway, and other NATO states to expel a total of over 140 Russian accredited diplomats (including those expelled by the UK).

Additionally, in July 2018, the COBR committee were assembled following a poisoning of two other British citizens in the town of Amesbury, not far from Salisbury, the location of the Skripals' poisoning. It was later confirmed by Porton Down that the substance was a Novichok agent. Sajid Javid, the United Kingdom's home secretary insisted in the house of commons that he was letting the investigation teams conduct a full investigation into what had happened before jumping to a major conclusion. He then re-iterated the initial question to Russia regarding the Novichok agent, accusing them of using the United Kingdom as a 'dumping ground'.

In his speech at the RUSI Land Warfare Conference in June 2018, the Chief of the General Staff Mark Carleton-Smith said that British troops should be prepared to "fight and win" against the "imminent" threat of hostile Russia. Carleton-Smith said: "The misplaced perception that there is no imminent or existential threat to the UK – and that even if there was it could only arise at long notice – is wrong, along with a flawed belief that conventional hardware and mass are irrelevant in countering Russian subversion...". In a November 2018 interview with the Daily Telegraph, Carleton-Smith said that "Russia today indisputably represents a far greater threat to our national security than Islamic extremist threats such as al-Qaeda and ISIL. ... We cannot be complacent about the threat Russia poses or leave it uncontested."

Conservative Party leader Boris Johnson's victory in the 2019 United Kingdom general election received a mixed response from Russia. Press Secretary Dmitry Peskov questioned "how appropriate ... hopes are in the case of the Conservatives" of good relations following the election. However, Putin praised Johnson, stating that "he felt the mood of British society better than his opponents".

==== 2020s ====
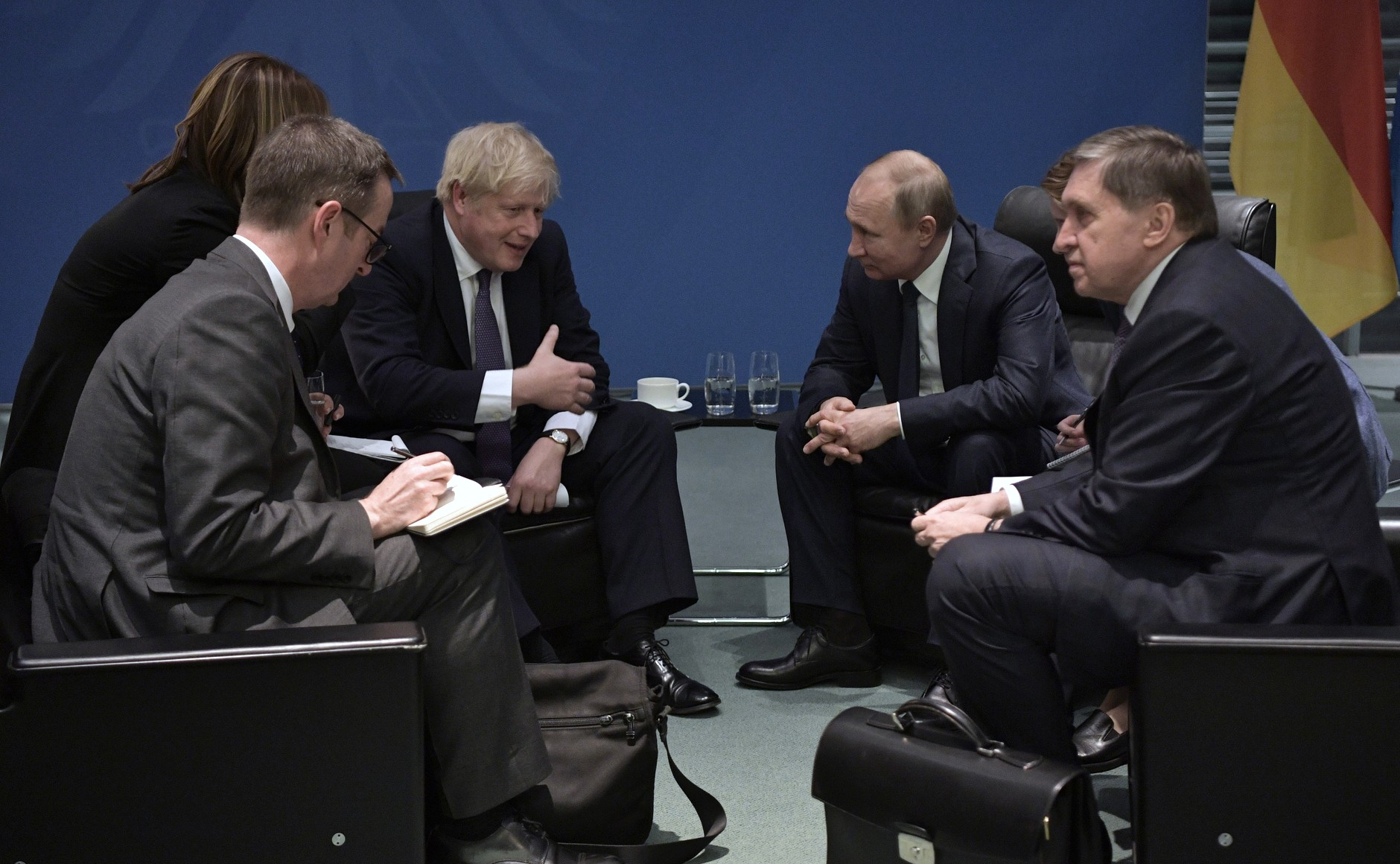
UK prime minister Boris Johnson and Russian president Vladimir Putin at the Berlin Conference on Libya, 19 January 2020

In March 2020, the British government declared Russia the most "acute" threat to UK security in the Integrated Review, which defines the government's foreign, defence, security and international development policies.

In June 2021, a confrontation occurred between HMS Defender (D36) and the Russian Armed Forces in the 2021 Black Sea incident.

===== Russian invasion of Ukraine =====
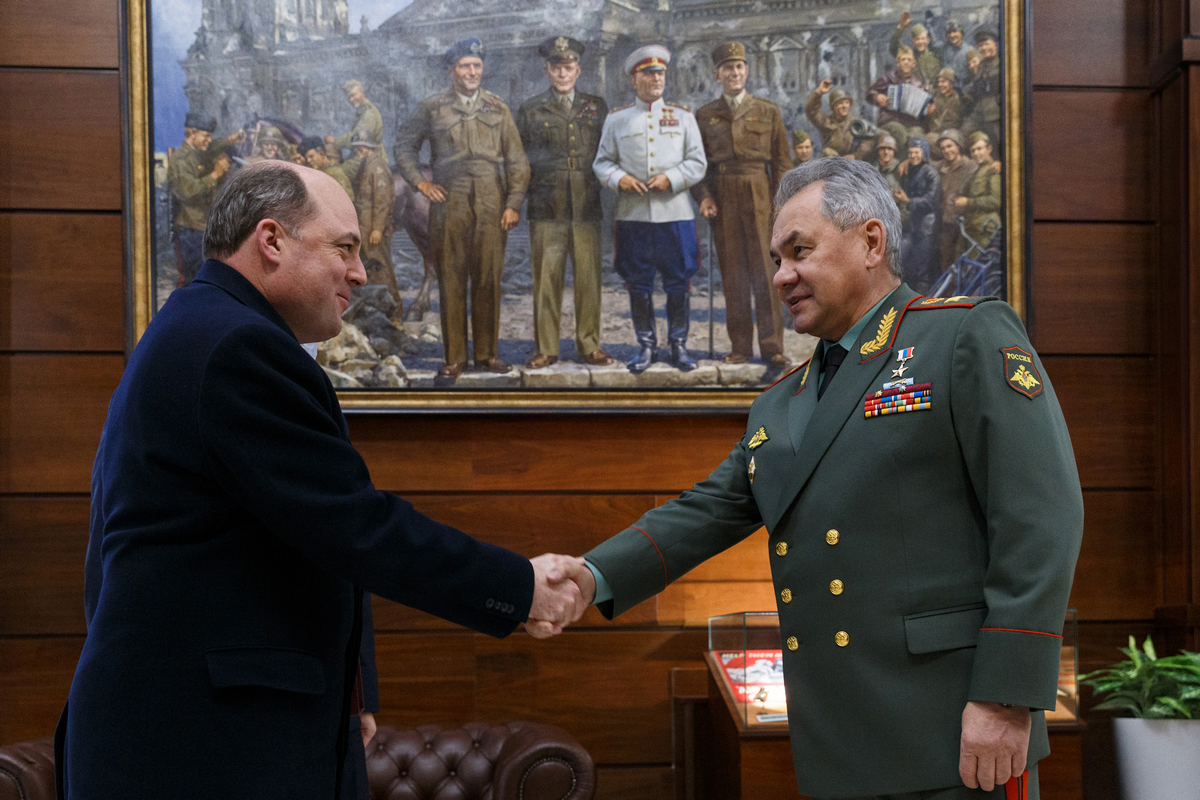
On 11 February 2022, UK defense secretary Ben Wallace met with Russian defense minister Sergei Shoigu, who assured him that Russia was not going to launch a full-scale invasion of Ukraine.

In response to the Russian invasion of Ukraine in February 2022 the UK government applied economic sanctions on Russian banks and individual citizens and banned Aeroflot aeroplanes from entering British airspace, in retaliation the Russian government banned British aeroplanes from entering Russian airspace.

Britain also supplied the Ukrainians with military equipment; most notably sending NLAW missiles to Ukraine, commencing in January 2022 in anticipation of the Russian invasion. As of 16 March 2022, the UK confirmed that it had delivered more than 4,000 NLAWs to Ukraine. In addition the UK commenced supplying Ukraine with Starstreak missiles (HVM) to help prevent Russian air supremacy. British soldiers were sent via Poland to help train Ukrainian forces. These were sent as an interim measure until the arrival of the Sky Sabre missile defence system.

On 26 February 2022, Britain and its partners took "decisive action" to block Russia's banks' access to the SWIFT international payment system, according to British prime minister Boris Johnson.

On 5 March 2022, Britain again issued statements condemning Russia's actions in Ukraine, and also urged its citizens to consider leaving the country. "If your presence in Russia is not essential, we strongly advise that you consider leaving by remaining commercial routes," announced the British government in a statement. On 11 March 2022, the United Kingdom imposed sanctions on 386 members of Russia's lower house of parliament and announced that it would attempt to prohibit the export of luxury products to Russia in order to raise diplomatic pressure on Russian president Vladimir Putin over the invasion of Ukraine. On 12 March 2022, France, the United Kingdom, and Germany cautioned Russia that its demands for economic guarantees with Iran could jeopardize an almost-completed nuclear deal. On 17 March 2022, the United Kingdom said it had "very, very strong evidence" of war crimes in Ukraine, and that Russian president Vladimir Putin was orchestrating them.

The UK is on Russia's "Unfriendly Countries List" (red). Countries and territories on the list have imposed or joined sanctions against Russia.

On 24 March 2022, the Kremlin declared Prime Minister Boris Johnson as the most active anti-Russian leader. Downing Street rejected these claims and stated that the Prime Minister was "anti-Putin" and had no issue with the Russian people.

On 3 May 2022, Russia aired a segment titled The Sinkable Island. During the segment, hosted by Dmitry Kiselyov, a simulation showing a hypothetical nuclear attack on Great Britain was shown. On 8 May 2022, British prime minister Boris Johnson's office stated that G7 leaders agreed that the world should increase economic pressure on Russian president Vladimir Putin in whatever manner feasible.

Besides supplying lethal aid to Ukraine, the UK has stated intent to mobilise for the possible event of direct involvement in a broader conflict with Russia as announced by General Sir Patrick Sanders on 28 June 2022 in what was known as Operation Mobilise. In July 2022, the UK sanctioned its own citizen, journalist Graham Phillips, who had been reporting from the Russian side, for his work which "supports and promotes actions and policies which destabilise Ukraine and undermine or threaten the territorial integrity, sovereignty, or independence of Ukraine."

On 29 September 2022, a Russian Su-27 fighter "released" a missile in the vicinity of a Royal Air Force Boeing RC-135 Rivet Joint which was carrying out a routine patrol over the Black Sea. Both the UK and Russia agreed that it was due to a technical malfunction, rather than a deliberate escalation. Patrols were temporarily suspended by the RAF following the incident but later resumed with fighter escorts.

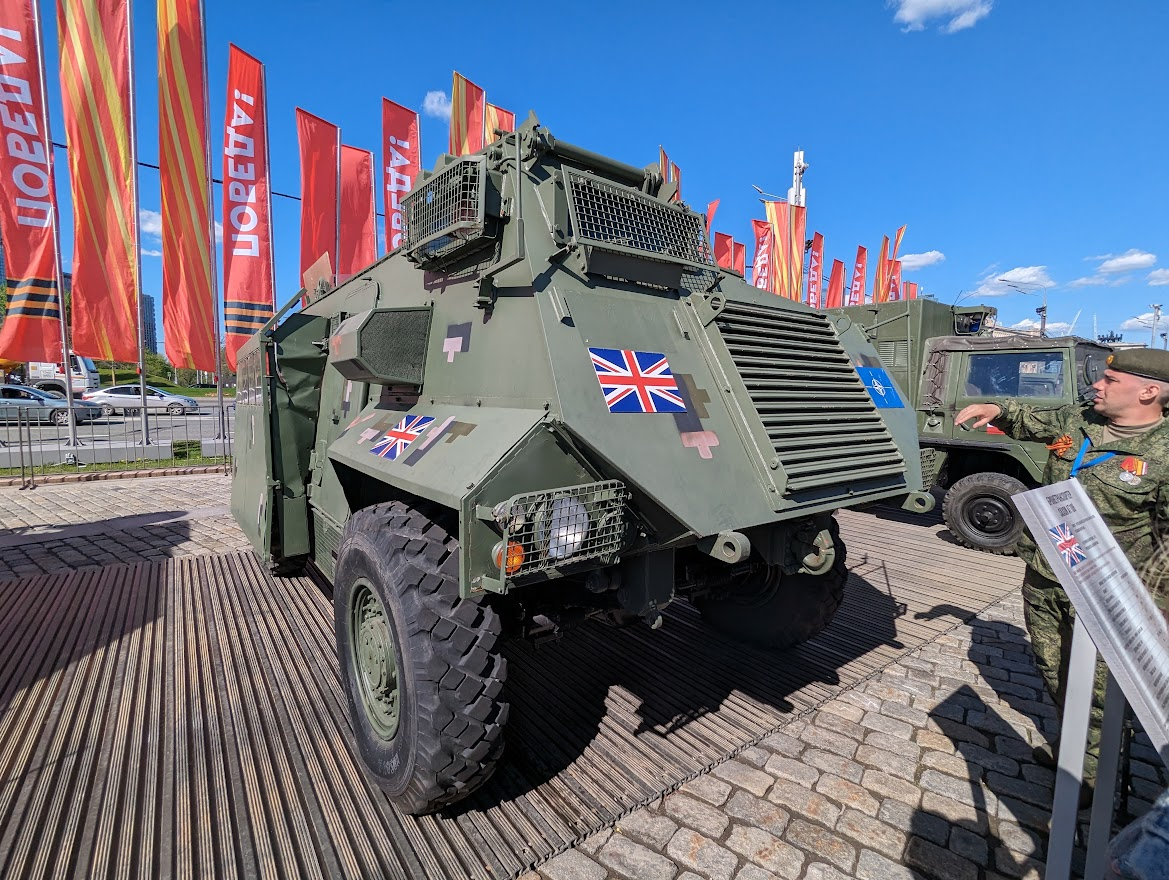
A captured AT105 Saxon in Ukrainian service on display at Moscow's Victory Park on Poklonnaya Hill, 2024

On 29 October 2022, Russia accused the UK of involvement in the 2022 Nord Stream pipeline sabotage, which it claimed were carried out by the Royal Navy, in addition to involvement in the drone strikes on the Sevastopol Naval Base. The UK Ministry of Defence released a statement denouncing the claims and stated that Russia was "peddling lies on an epic scale". Earlier in the month, Russia had also accused the UK of involvement in the Crimean Bridge explosion.

The appointment of Rishi Sunak as UK prime minister in October 2022 did not change the UK's anti-Russian position, and policies. In May 2023 at the annual G7 summit, in Tokyo, Sunak stepped up sanctions on Russia, banning the import of Russian diamonds, along with Russian-origin copper, aluminium and nickel, as he redoubled UK support for Ukraine. The UK also sanctioned a further 86 Russian individuals and companies.

In July 2024, British prime minister Keir Starmer gave Ukraine permission to strike targets inside Russia with British-supplied Storm Shadow missiles.

On 24 February 2025, the U.K. unveiled new sanctions against Russia to mark the third anniversary of its invasion of Ukraine.

In June 2026, British forces intercepted and boarded the Russian shadow fleet oil tanker Smyrtos in the English Channel during a six-hour operation involving Royal Marine Commandos and law enforcement officers.

On 18 August 2026, British prime minister Andy Burnham confirms that the United Kingdom will continue to militarily support Ukraine after Russia warned the UK will face "consequences" for allowing Ukraine to use British-made drones to strike targets deep inside Russian territory.

== Espionage and influence operations ==
In June 2010, UK intelligence officials were saying that Russian spying activity in the UK was back at the Cold War level and that MI5 had been for a few years building up its counter-espionage capabilities against Russians; it was also noted that Russia's focus was "largely directed on expatriates." In mid-August 2010, Sir Stephen Lander, Director-General of MI5 (1996–2002), said this of the level of Russian intelligence's activity in the UK: "If you go back to the early 90s, there was a hiatus. Then the spying machine got going again and the SVR [formerly the KGB], they've gone back to their old practices with a vengeance. I think by the end of the last century they were back to where they had been in the Cold War, in terms of numbers."

Directing non-domestic policy within overseas intelligence is a key but not a sole purpose of such information, its capability based on the information it can act on needs to be understood on its own. Separating its own capability from that gained from intelligence outsourcing and thus serves its purpose as explained.

In January 2012, Jonathan Powell, prime minister Tony Blair's chief of staff in 2006, admitted Britain was behind a plot to spy on Russia with a device hidden in a fake rock that was discovered in 2006 in a case that was publicised by Russian authorities; he said: "Clearly they had known about it for some time and had been saving it up for a political purpose." Back in 2006, the Russian security service, the FSB, linked the rock case to British intelligence agents making covert payments to NGOs in Russia; shortly afterwards, president Vladimir Putin introduced a law that tightened regulation of funding non-governmental organisations in Russia.

== Embassies ==
The Embassy of Russia is located in London, United Kingdom. The Embassy of the United Kingdom is located in Moscow, Russia.

Outside Moscow, there is one British Consulate-General in Yekaterinburg. There was a British Consulate General in St. Petersburg but it was closed in 2018 due to a diplomatic fallout following the Skripals affair. There is a Russian Consulate General in Edinburgh.

== See also ==
- Russian money in London
- Foreign relations of the Soviet Union
- Foreign policy of the Russian Empire
- Foreign policy of Vladimir Putin
- History of Russia
- International relations, 1648–1814
- International relations (1814–1919)
  - Diplomatic history of World War I
- International relations (1919–1939)
- Diplomatic history of World War II
- Cold War
- Embassy of Russia, London
- List of ambassadors of Russia to the United Kingdom
- List of Ambassadors of the United Kingdom to Russia
- Timeline of British diplomatic history
- Anti-Russian sentiment
- Anti-British sentiment
- Cold War II
- Russian interference in British politics
- Soviet Union–United Kingdom relations
- Ukraine–United Kingdom relations

=== Minorities ===
- Russians in the United Kingdom
- Britons in Russia

(Anglo-Russians, Scottish Russians and Irish Russians)
