= Consulate-General of the United Kingdom, Saint Petersburg =

British Consulate-General, Saint Petersburg
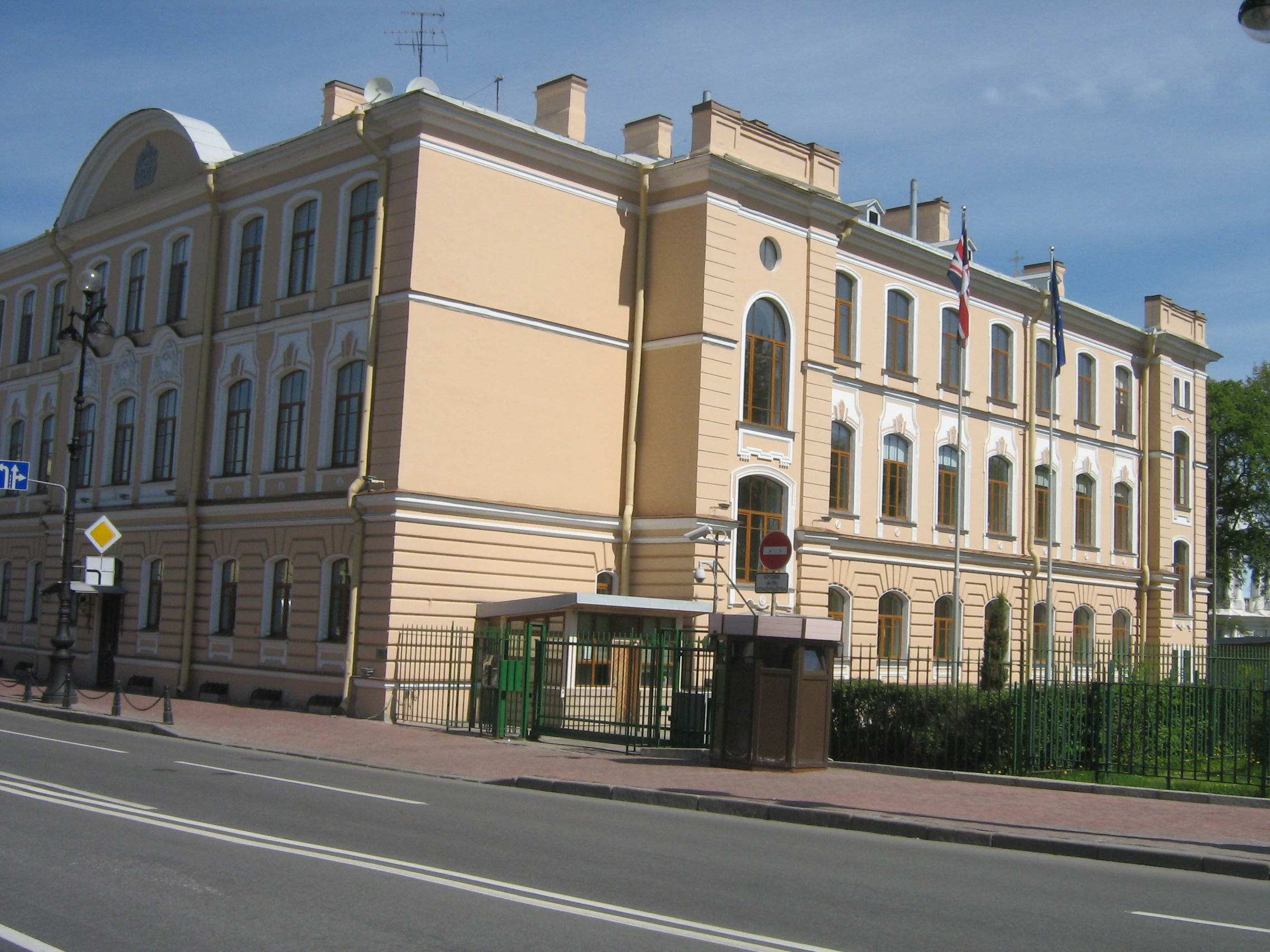
- Location: St. Petersburg, Russia
- Address: 5 Lafonskaya Street
- Consul General: Dr. Monika Sangeeta Ahuja (last consul-general)
- Website: Official website

The Consulate-General of the United Kingdom in Saint Petersburg was part of the diplomatic mission of the United Kingdom in the Russian Federation, before it was closed down in 2018. It was located on Lafonskaya Street in Tsentralny District.

The last British Consul General in Saint Petersburg was Monika Sangeeta Ahuja; she was appointed to the post in February 2017, and arrived there in December of the same year.

== History ==
Before the October Revolution of 1917, the British embassy in Russia was seated in Saint Petersburg, in a palace overlooking the Troitsky Bridge. Diplomatic relations were then broken off. In 1924, after the Russian Civil War, Great Britain was the first foreign power to recognize the new Soviet government, sending an ambassador in 1924. However, he was provided with a palace at Boloto, on the Island, or Zamoskvorechye, near the Kremlin in Moscow. The British embassy remained there until 2000.

As the Russian Federation replaced the Soviet Union, the British Consulate-General in St. Petersburg was re-opened, and Barbara Hay was appointed as its first new Consul-General in 1992. The consulate would go on to operate for 26 years.

In 1997, the Consulate coordinated the British program of events in St. Petersburg dedicated to the three hundredth anniversary of Peter the Great's Embassy to Great Britain.

Throughout its work, the Consulate supported such traditional cultural events as the "Days of Scottish Culture in St. Petersburg", held annually since 1971.

In 2018, in response to the UK's decision to expel 23 Russian diplomats following the poisoning of Sergei and Yulia Skripal, Russia closed the Consulate-General, while also expelling 23 British diplomats and closing the office of the British Council in Russia.

== List of Consuls-General ==
- Barbara Hay
- Monika Sangeeta Ahuja

== Other locations in Russia ==
The British Consulate-General in Yekaterinburg is still operational, as well as the Embassy of the United Kingdom in Moscow.

== See also ==
- List of diplomatic missions in Russia
- Embassy of the United Kingdom in Moscow
- Russia–United Kingdom relations
