= K. T. Dholakia =

Indian orthopedic surgeon

- Born: August 12, 1920; Rajkot, Gujarat, India
- Died: June 17, 2004 (aged 83)
- Occupation: Orthopedic surgeon
- Known for: Knee replacement surgery
- Spouse: Saroj
- Awards: Padma Shri

Kandarp Tuljashanker Dholakia (1920-2004) was an Indian orthopedic surgeon and one of the pioneers of joint replacement surgery in India. Born in Rajkot in the state of Gujarat on 12 August 1920, Dholakia was the president of Indian Orthopaedic Association and the Association of Surgeons of India. The Government of India awarded him the fourth highest Indian civilian award of Padma Shri in 1973. He died on 17 June 2004, at the age of 83.
