= Danae Dholakia =

British diplomat

Danae Dholakia is a British diplomat who, since June 2025, has been Deputy Head of Mission at the British Embassy in Moscow.

== Studies ==
Danae Dholakia studied Environmental Science at Lancaster University and earned a Master's Degree at Brunel University.

== Previous roles ==
Before joining the Foreign and Commonwealth Office Danae Dholakia worked in the NGO sector in Eastern and Central Africa for seven years.

Dholakia worked as the Foreign and Commonwealth Office's Deputy Director covering Eastern Europe and Central Asia. Previous experience has included a period as Deputy Director on Counter-Terrorism issues in the Home Office, on NATO, on the EU in Brussels, and on UN issues.

Danae Dholakia was subsequently appointed as a Political Counsellor in Pretoria.

Danae Dholakia was appointed Special Envoy to Africa's Great Lakes Region in June 2015. She was also Head of Southern and Central Africa Department at the Foreign and Commonwealth Office.

== Moscow appointment ==
In 2026 she has twice been summoned (in her capacity as U.K. Chargé d'Affaires) to the Russian Foreign Ministry regarding the expulsion of British diplomats:

- In January 2026 she was summoned when a British diplomat was expelled from Russia after allegedly spying.
- On 31 March 2026 she was again summoned to the Russian Foreign Ministry after another expulsion.
