= Likhud Brothers =

Greek monks and educators

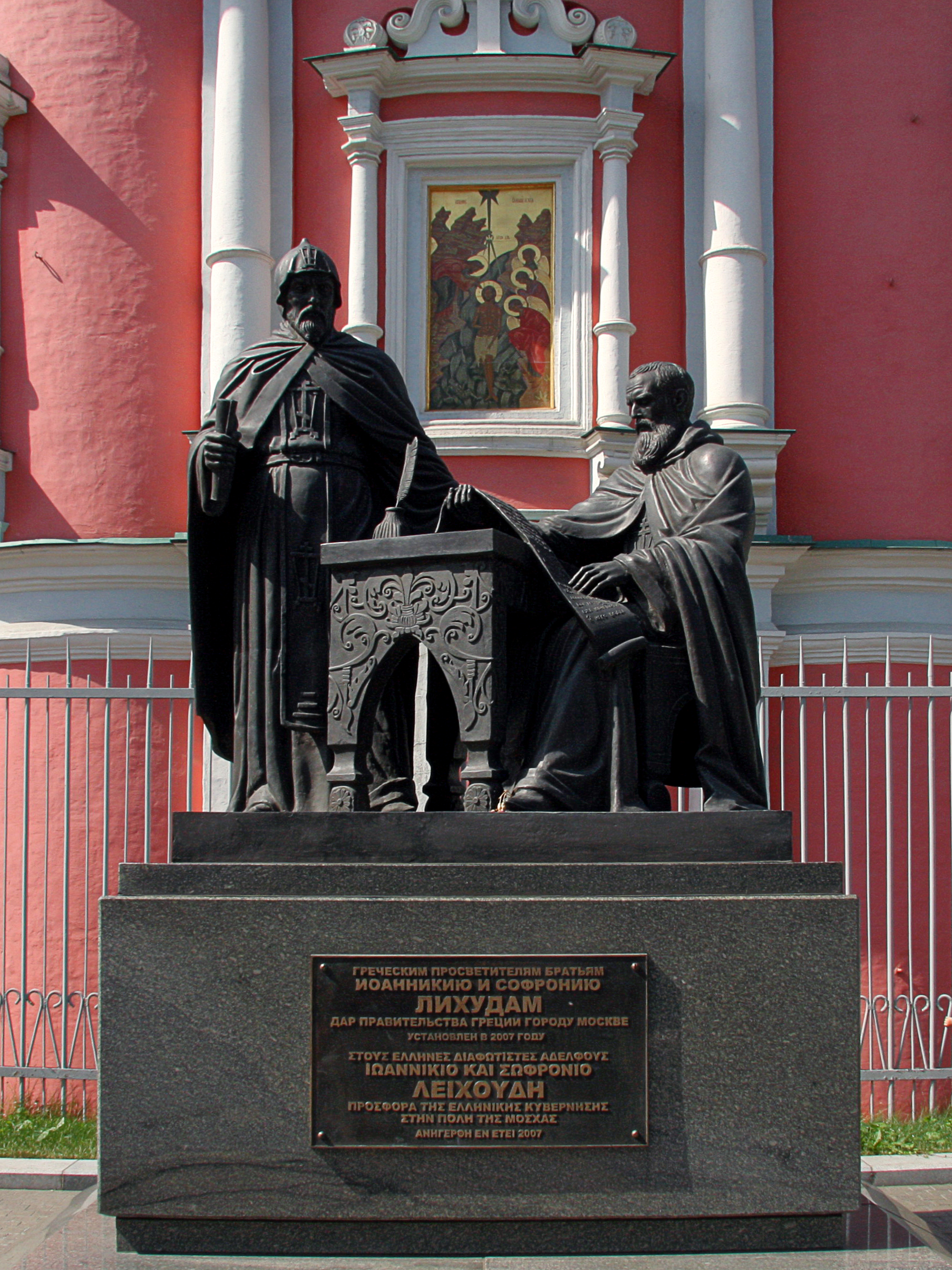
A statue of the Likhud brothers in Kitay-gorod

The Likhud Brothers (Russian: Братья Лихуды) were two Greek monks from Cephalonia who founded and managed the Slavic Greek Latin Academy in Moscow between 1685 and 1694. Their names were Ioannikios Leichoudes (Greek: Ιωαννίκιος Λειχούδης) or Ioannikii Likhud (Russian: Иоанникий Лихуд, 1633–1717) and Sophronios Leichoudes (Greek: Σωφρόνιος Λειχούδης) or Sofronii Likhud (Russian: Софроний Лихуд, 1653–1730).

The brothers received their education at the Padua University in Italy. Patriarch Dositheos II of Jerusalem persuaded them to visit Moscow where they were given a warm welcome by Prince Vasily Galitzine (the head of Sophia's government). On their arrival they were allowed to establish the Slavic Greek Latin Academy on the premises of Zaikonospassky Monastery in Kitay-Gorod. It was effectively the first high school in Russia.

The Likhuds authored a series of bilingual manuals and guidebooks on philosophy, physics, logic, grammar, and poetics. The Muscovites regarded these books as a novelty, although they essentially regurgitated the ancient Aristotelian tenets. In the dispute between the pro-Latin and pro-Greek scholars the Likhuds supported the latter. Their opponents included Symeon of Polotsk and Sylvester Medvedev. In 1688 the elder brother was sent on a diplomatic mission to Venice.

After Galitzine's fall from grace the Likhud brothers were removed from the academy on charges of "latinism". Following a brief exile at the Hypatian Monastery in Kostroma, the brothers moved their educational activities to Novgorod. After Ioannikios' death in 1717 Sophronios was sent to administer the Solotcha Monastery near Ryazan where he was taunted by the brethren and had to confine himself to his cell.

The Likhud Brothers are remembered as the pioneers of higher education in Russia. In 2007 their statue was unveiled in front of the Epiphany Monastery in Kitay-Gorod.
