= Epiphany Monastery =

Monastery in Moscow, Russia

Coordinates: 55°45′21.1″N 37°37′23.6″E

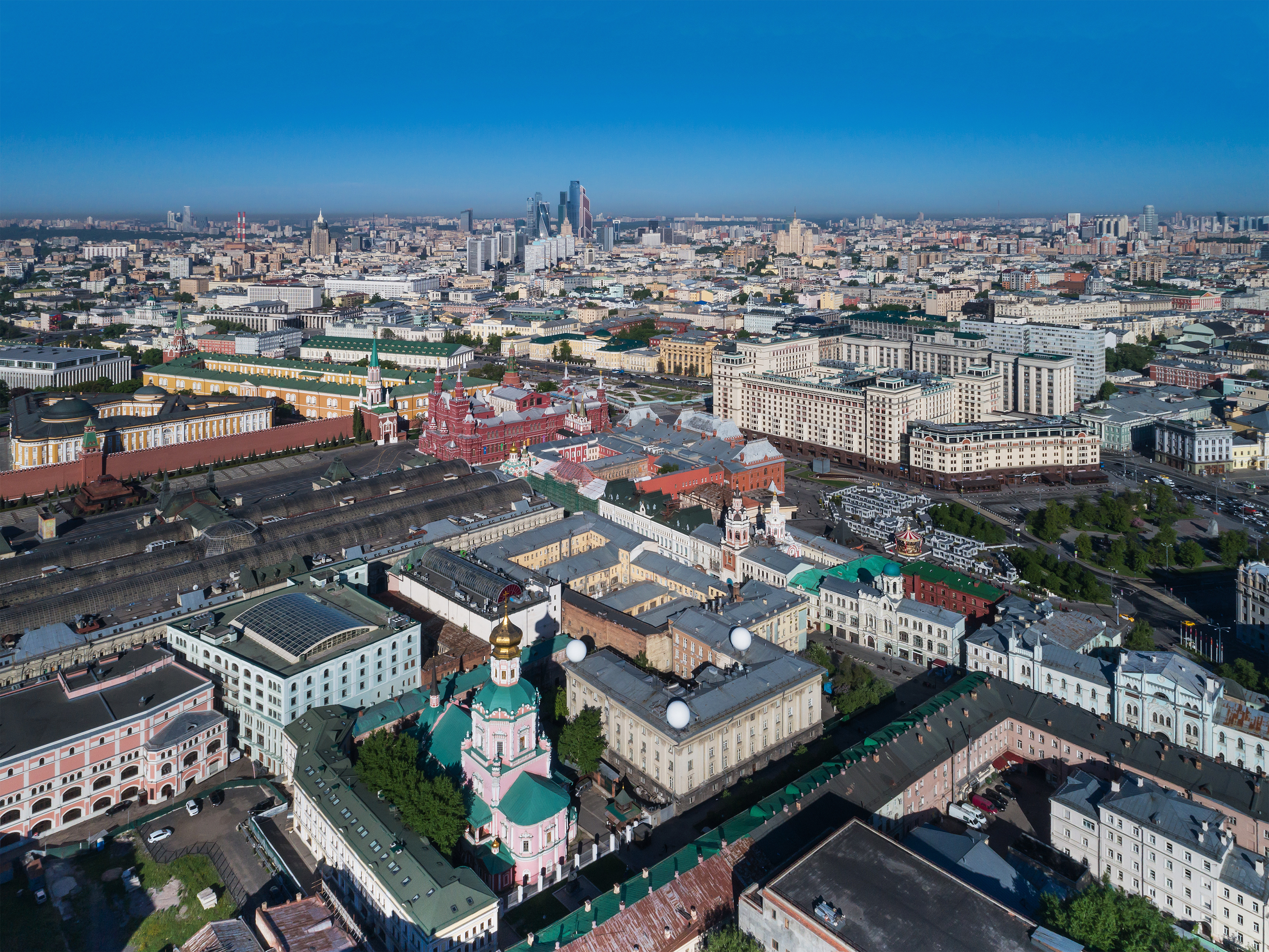
The northwestern part of the Kitai gorod. The Epiphany Monastery may be seen in the foreground.

The Epiphany Monastery (Russian: Богоявленский монастырь, Bogoyavlensky monastyr; better translated as "Theophany Monastery") is the oldest male monastery in Moscow, situated in the Kitai gorod, just one block away from the Moscow Kremlin.

According to a legend, it was founded by Daniel, the first prince of Moscow, around 1296. It is also believed that a would-be metropolitan Alexis was one of the monks at this monastery. Stefan, Sergii Radonezhski's older brother, was the first recorded hegumen of this cloister.

The first stone church at the Bogoyavlensky monastery was founded in 1342. In 1382, the monastery was sacked by Tokhtamysh's horde. In 1427, it suffered an outbreak of pestilence. The monastery also survived numerous fires, the most important being recorded in 1547, 1551, 1687 and 1737.

The Epiphany monastery has always been under the patronage of grand princes and tsars. By the order of Ivan the Terrible, the monastery became a collection facility for metayage, quitrent, and fodder. In 1584, the tsar donated a substantial amount of money for the remembrance of the disgraced. In 1632, the Epiphany monastery was granted an exclusive right for tax free floating of a certain amount of building materials and firewood. The monastery had its own stables, forge and rented out its own facilities.

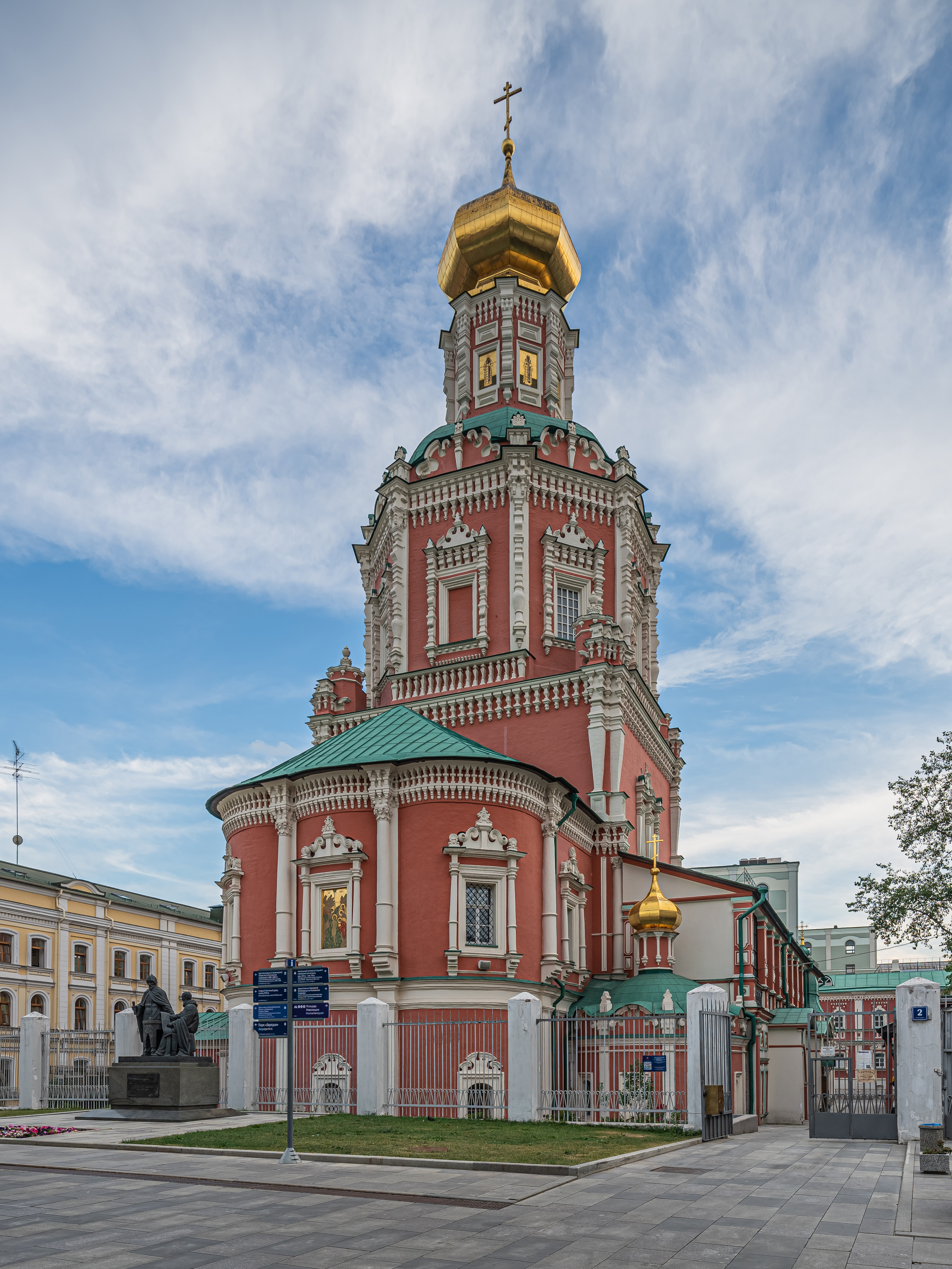
The katholikon was built between 1693 and 1696.

Vasili III, Ivan the Terrible, Boris Godunov, the Romodanovsky boyars, Xenia Repnina, and others donated some of their sizeable estates to the monastery. In 1680-1687, the Epiphany monastery was home to a school of the Likhud brothers, which would later be transferred to the Zaikonospassky monastery and transformed into the famous Slavic Greek Latin Academy.

The now-existing Epiphany cathedral was consecrated in 1696. A splendid specimen of the Muscovite baroque style, it incorporated some notable medieval sepulchres. In the 1690s, they also built cells for monks and abbot's chamber, which would be re-built in the 1880s. In 1739, a belltower was erected. By 1744, the monastery had already owned 216 peasant homesteads and 1014 peasants.

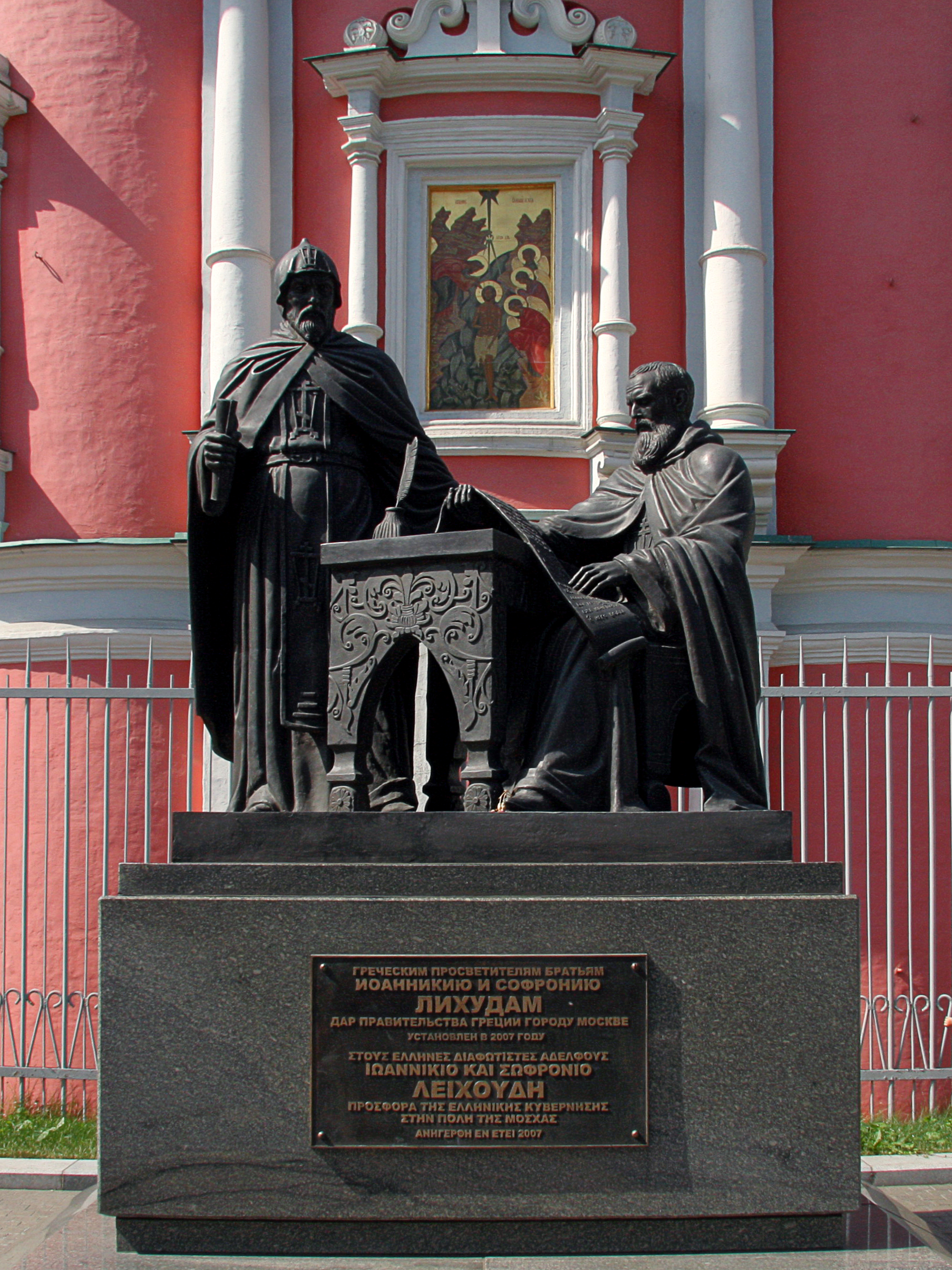
The Greek government presented to the monastery a bronze statue of the Greek Lichud brothers, the founders of the Slavic Greek Latin Academy

In 1764, monastic real estate was confiscated. Thenceforth monastery's staff rarely included more than 17 monks. In 1788, the Epiphany monastery was proclaimed a residence of the vicarian bishop of the Moscow bishopric. In the late 18th century, the buildings enclosing the monastery were rented out to the haberdashers.

In 1905-1909, they built the so-called dokhodniy dom, or a building with "office space" for rent. By 1907, The Bogoyavlensky monastery had already had 14 monks and 18 novitiates and owned 60 desyatinas of land. It was also receiving an allowance of 1245 rubles from the state treasury.

After the October Revolution, the Epiphany monastery was closed down. In 1929, they stopped holding services in the Bogoyavlensky cathedral. The monastic facilities were first transformed into a campus for students of the Mining Academy and workers, engaged in the subway construction, and later - into metalworks. In the 1950s, they built an office building on the site of the monastery. The cathedral, belltower, monk cells and abbot's chamber were the only buildings to survive. In May, 1991, the Epiphany monastery was restored and officially returned to the Russian Orthodox Church.
