= Leichoudes =

Leichoudes or Lichoudes (Greek: Λειχούδης) is a Greek surname. Notable people with the surname include:

- Constantine Leichoudes (died 1063), Patriarch of Constantinople from 1059 to 1063
- Ioannikios Leichoudes (1633–1717) and Sophronios Leichoudes (1653–1730), Greek monks who founded the Slavic Greek Latin Academy in Moscow
