= Symeon of Polotsk =

Belarusian poet, dramatist, and cleric (1629–1680)

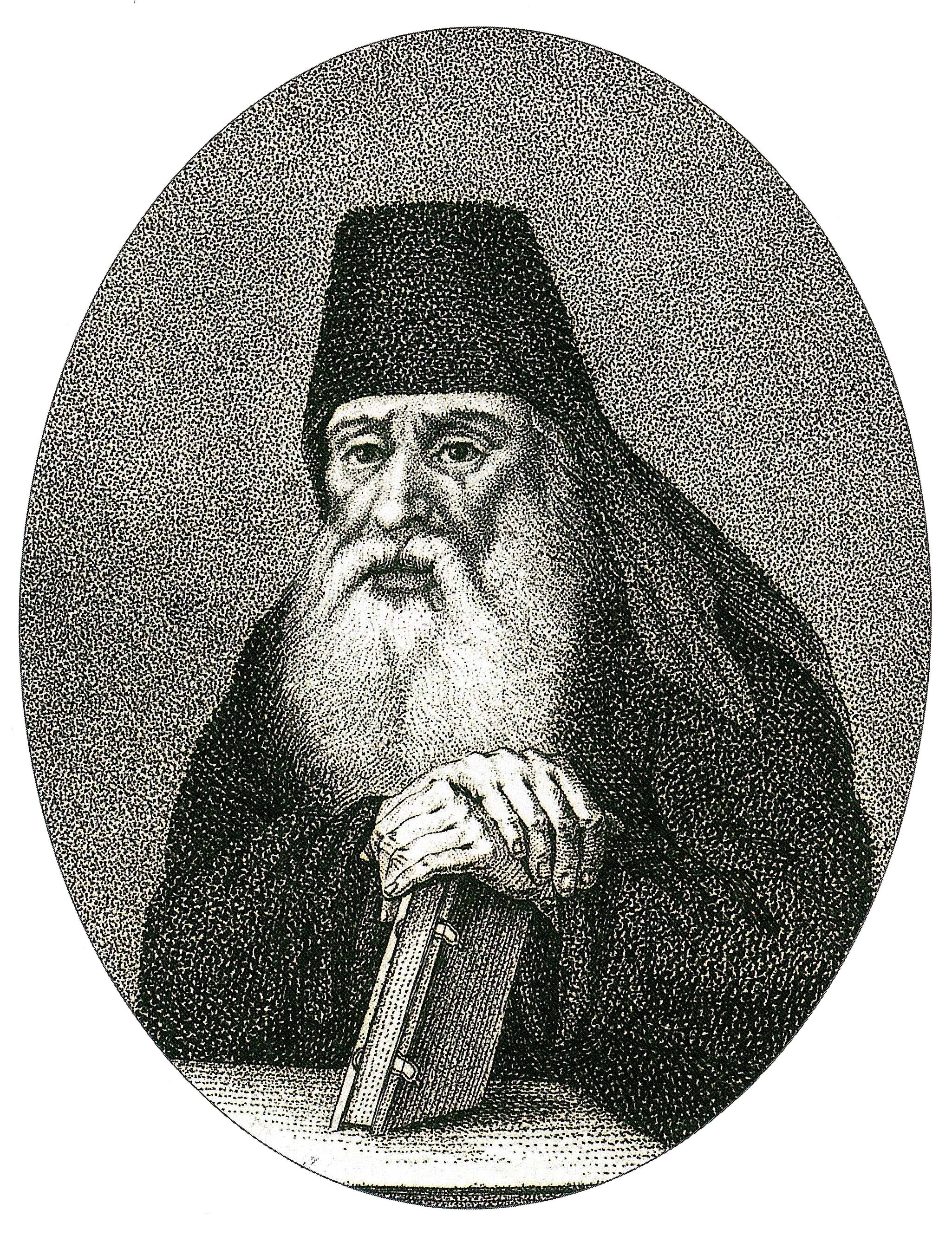
- Born: 12 December 1629; Polotsk
- Died: 25 August 1680 (aged 50); Moscow
- Resting place: Monastery of the Holy Mandylion
- Occupation: Playwright, poet, theologian

Symeon (Simeon) of Polotsk or Symeon Polotsky (Russian: Симео́н По́лоцкий; born as Samuel Piotrowski-Sitnianowicz, Russian: Самуи́л Петро́вский-Ситнянович; December 12, 1629 – August 25, 1680) was an academically-trained Baroque poet, dramatist, churchman, and enlightener of Belarusian descent who came from the Polish–Lithuanian Commonwealth to the Tsardom of Russia.

== Life ==
A native of Polotsk, Symeon studied at the Kiev Ecclesiastical Academy and probably continued on to the Jesuit college of Wilno: the influence of Jesuit theology and school dramas was very pronounced in his mature work. He became a Greek-Catholic monk (he described himself as "Simeonis Piotrowskj Sitnianowicz hieromonachi Polocens.[is] Ord.[inis] S.[ancti] Bas.[ilii] M.[agni] ") in 1656.

His name became known later that year, when he presented to Tsar Alexis, then visiting his native Polotsk during the war, several panegyrics in verse. The monarch was pleased to discover what looked like propaganda of the Third Rome doctrine in the modern Western style that would appeal to Ruthenian and Polish intellectuals alike. Symeon was recognized as an invaluable asset to Moscow's campaign to cast the Tsar as a champion of Eastern Rite in the region.

The Tsar invited Symeon to relocate to Moscow, where at the request of Tsar Alexis he opened the first school aimed at educating Russian clerks in Latin, then the language of diplomacy in 1664. By 1668, the school no longer was in operation. Apart from Latin, Symeon was the first to teach grammar, poetics, and rhetoric to the Russians. He revived the long-forgotten art of preaching, and his sermons proved quite popular with the Muscovite courtiers, such as Fyodor Rtishchev and Bogdan Khitrovo. His erudition made him famous in other Orthodox countries. At the request of the Oriental patriarchs, he delivered an address urging the promotion of Greek learning in the country.

A statue of Symeon was created in 2003 by Alexandr Finsky and resides in Polatsk, Belarus.

== His role in the Synod of 1666 ==
Unsurprisingly, given his background, Symeon of Polotsk took a profound stand against clerical and literary conservatives, or the Old Believers. As the Great Schism of the Russian Orthodox Church was developing, he was called upon to elaborate refutation of their tenets. It was he who drafted decisions of the church council that deposed Patriarch Nikon and anathemized his opponents. This was known as the Great Moscow Synod.

In recognition of his wisdom and erudition, Symeon was charged with the task of educating the Tsar's children: the heir Alexei Alexeyevich until his death, then the future Fyodor III, Regent Sophia, and Peter I. In 1679 he prepared the decree to establish the Slavic Greek Latin Academy but before it opened, he died at the age of 50. He was buried in the Zaikonospassky Monastery, where the Academy would be opened two years later.

== Works ==
He is frequently cited as the first poet in the language, although the bulk of his work is either in Church Slavonic or Polish. As a poet, he clung to the principles of syllabic Polish versification which he learned as a youth. By adopting syllabic verse, he is said to have stultified Russian verse for over a century.

His poetry is primarily panegyric and didactic, and either celebrates some important court and political event or exposes some shortcoming of contemporary life. Polotsky tried to bring to the Russians the pattern and motives of Western—better to say, Polish—literature. His language is heavy and cumbersome but his choice of new topics and rather skillful command of syllabic versification won him the admiration of the tsar and the court...

During his years in Moscow, Symeon continued to develop an imperial style of panegyrical verse, rife with protracted tirades, which were enlivened by occasional allusions to classical mythology. "With Simeon, a whole museum of ancient gods, muses, heroes, authors, and philosophers entered Russian literature". His extensive collection of poetry, The Garden of Many Flowers, was not printed in his lifetime, but he did publish a verse translation of the Psalter, which was set to music within several years after his death, which took place Moscow.

As a theologian, Symeon frequently quoted the Vulgate, St. Jerome, St. Augustine, and other Latin authorities, which was perceived by his detractors as a deliberate attempt to westernize Orthodox religious thought. In fact, his faithful disciple Sylvester Medvedev was later condemned for having succumbed to Catholicism. Symeon was also a dramatist; the comedy Action of the Prodigal Son and the tragedy On Nebuchadnezzar the King rank among the first dramatic works in the Russian language.

Polotsk's book, The Rod of Reign (1667) was returned in Moscow March 9, 2021 to the Ambassador of Belarus to Russia, Vladimir Semashko, from Archimandrite Oleg
