= Karion Istomin =

Russian poet (d. 1717)

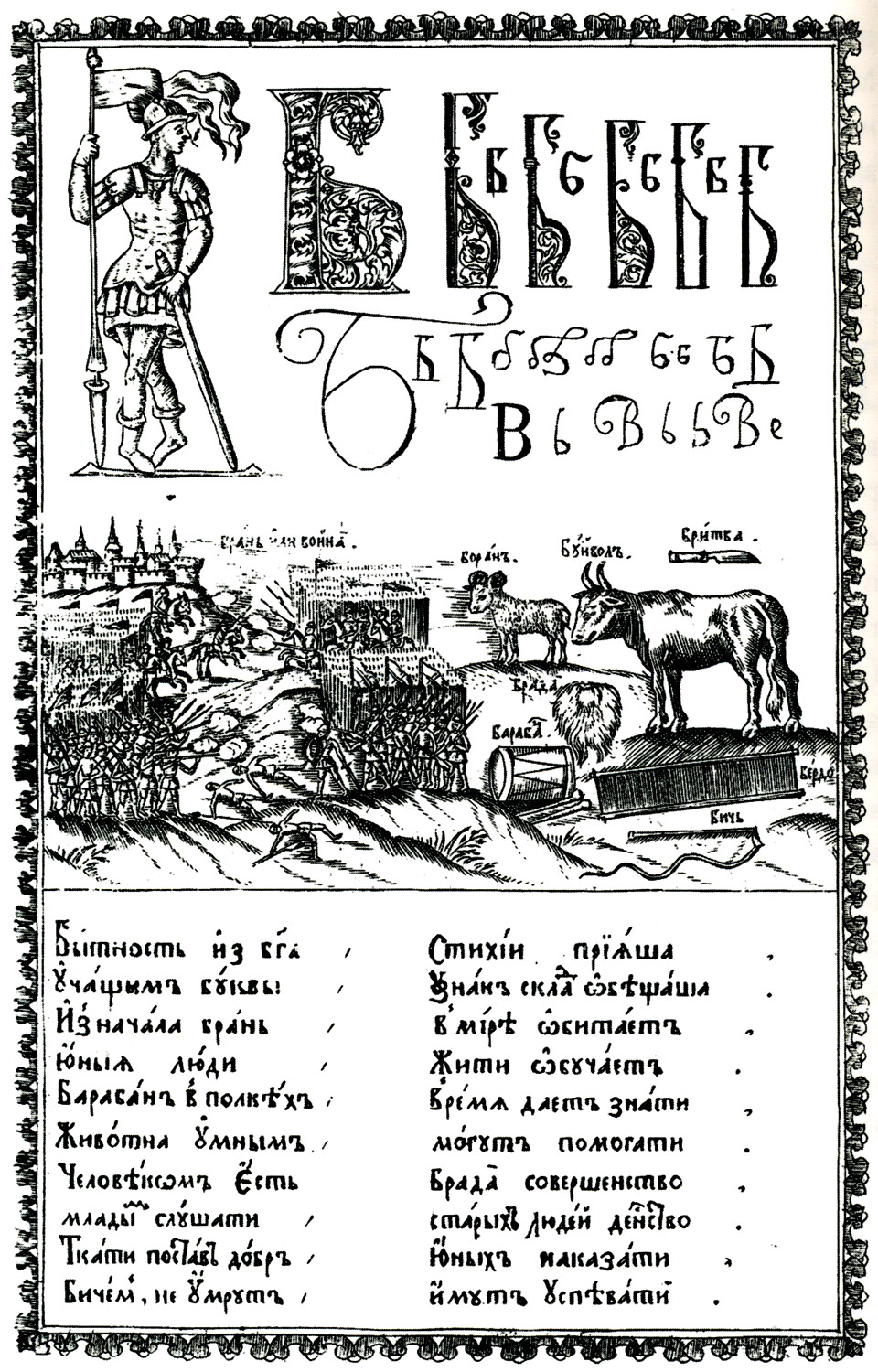
Page for letter "Б" from Karion Istomin's alphabet book (1694)

Karion Istomin (Russian: Карион Истомин; late 1640s – 26 May 1717) was a Russian poet, translator, and one of the first Russian enlighteners. He was a student of Sylvester Medvedev.

== Life ==
Karion Istomin was born in Kursk. He was a celibate priest and then a hegumen at the Chudov Monastery. He graduated from the patriarchal school and then worked at the Print Yard from 1679 to 1701. Istomin started as a regular scrivener, then held the post of editor, and later became the head of the yard. He is known to have authored and translated from Latin historical, religious, and pedagogical works, including his Arithmetics (Арифметика) and the Book of Reasoning (Книга вразумления), in which Istomin directed the 11-year-old Peter I on proper manners. Also, he wrote numerous acathistuses, prayers, epitaphs, and panegyrical, congratulatory, and edifying poems. In the 1690s, Istomin compiled the Small Alphabet Book (Малый букварь) and Big Alphabet Book (Большой букварь) for Tsarevich Alexei Petrovich, in which verse facilitated learning.

Istomin also wrote in verse the lives of the saints, an edifying treatise for schoolchildren called Домострой (Domostroy, or 'Household Management'), and a book named Полис ('Polis'), which was a short encyclopedia for younger readers, written in verse. It contained characteristics of twelve different sciences and most important geographical knowledge. Being an active supporter of the Petrine reforms in Moscow, Istomin was one of the first in Russia to realize the necessity of co-education of boys and girls. He elaborated methods of school education, which would be used in Russian schools throughout the 18th century. Istomin died in Moscow, and was buried at the cemetery of the Zaikonospassky monastery.
