= Kitay-gorod =

Historic core area in Moscow, Russia

Coordinates: 55°45′21″N 37°37′26″E

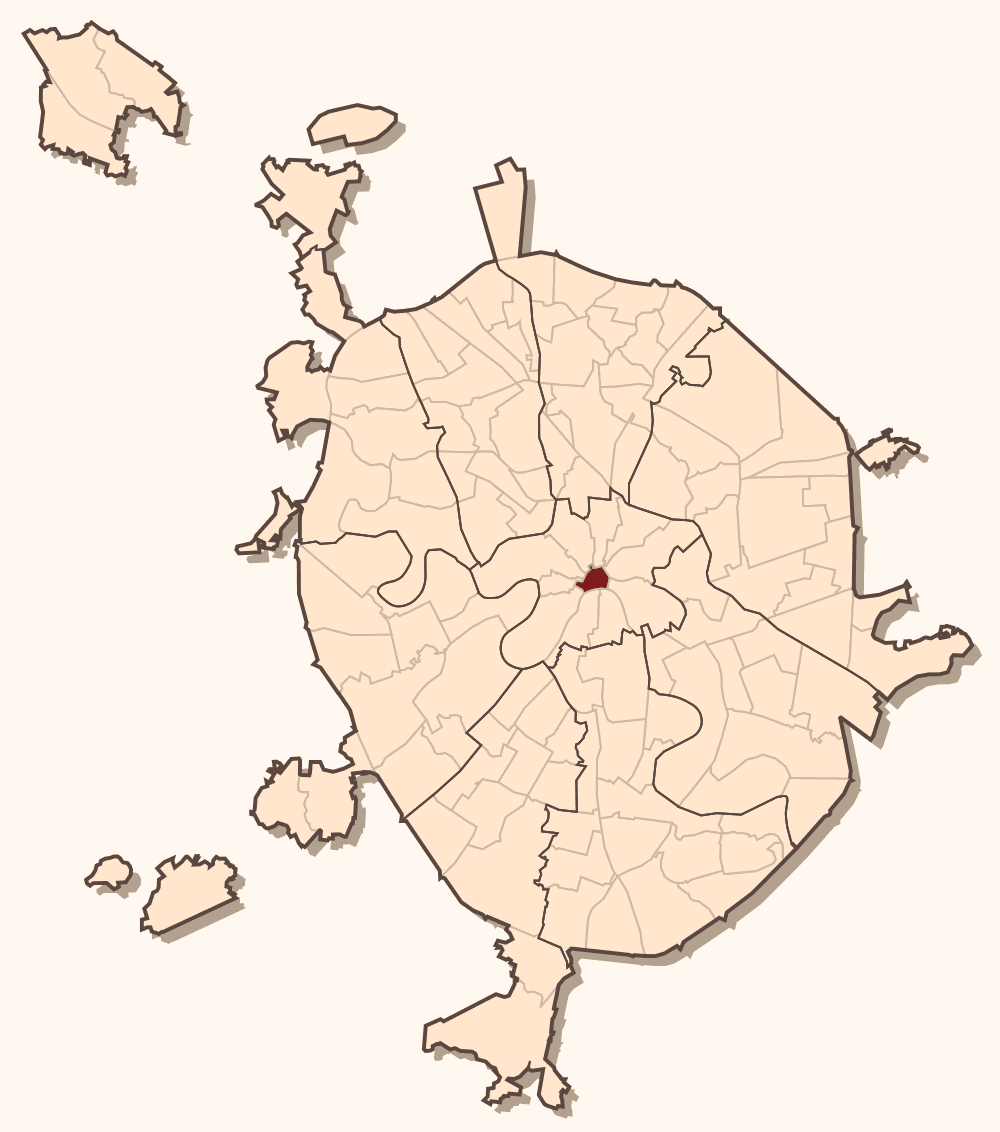
Kitay-gorod's central location in Moscow

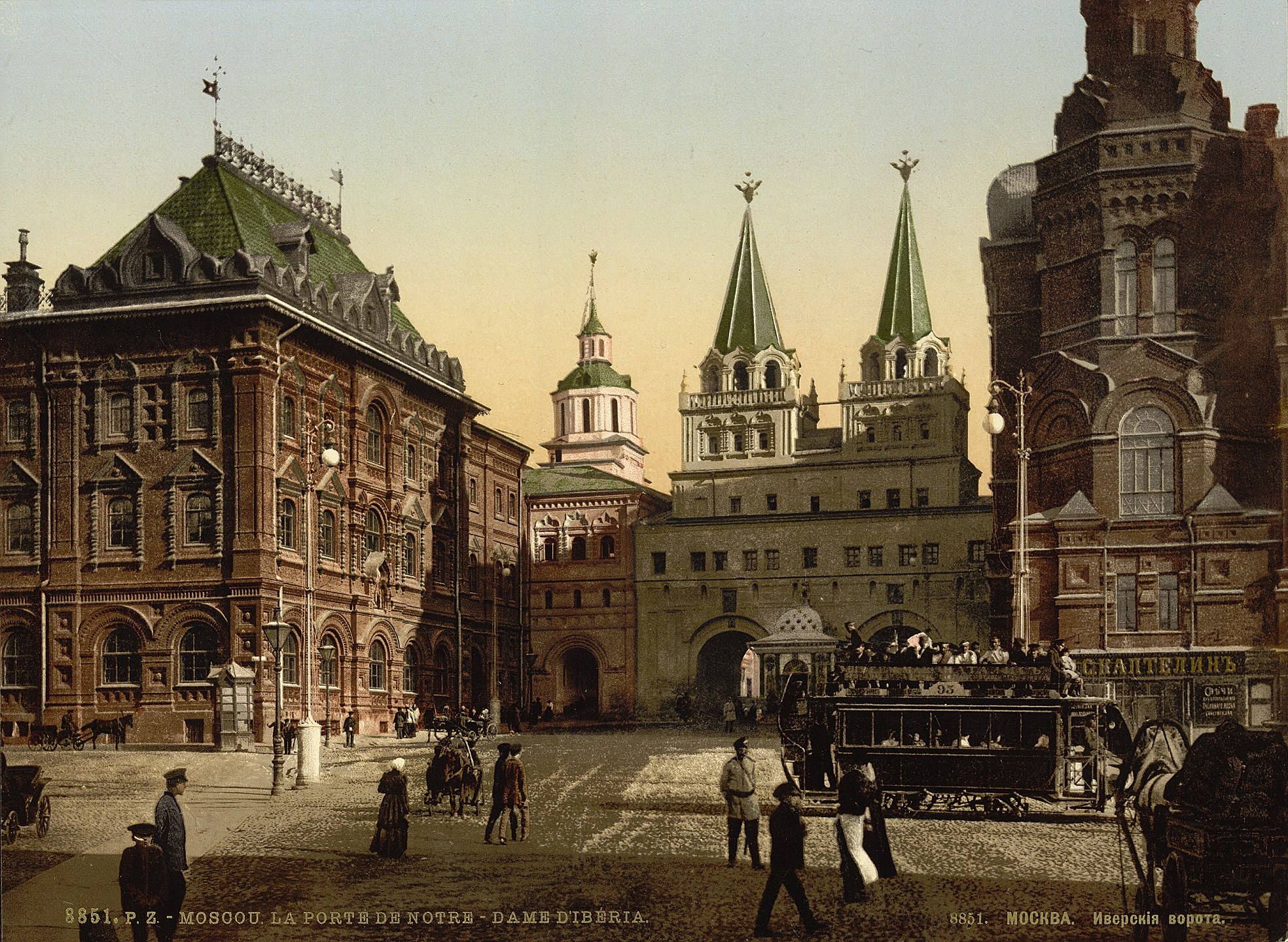
Iverskiye Gates leading to Red Square are the only extant gates of the Kitay-gorod wall; they were demolished in 1931 by the Soviet Union and rebuilt in the 1990s.

Kitay-gorod (Russian: Китай-город, romanized: Kitay-gorod, lit. 'Chinatown', Russian pronunciation: [kʲɪˈtaj ˈɡorət]), also referred to as the Great Possad (Великий Посад) in the 16th and 17th centuries, is a cultural and historical area within the central part of Moscow in Russia, defined by the remnants of now almost entirely razed fortifications, narrow streets and very densely built cityscape. It is separated from the Kremlin by the Red Square. Kitay-gorod does not constitute a district (raion), as there are no resident voters, thus, municipal elections are not possible. Rather, the territory has been part of Tverskoy District, and the Central Administrative Okrug authorities have managed the area directly since 2003.

== Etymology ==
Beside Kitay-gorod in Grand Duchy of Moscow in ancient Russia. Older sources said that people with darker skin than other ethnic groups of Russia sold goods and traded with other peoples in the area of the Kitay sea.

Kita (pl. kity) is a somewhat obsolete word for "plait" or "an item made by braiding". A 17th-century Russian source states "У шапок янычары имели киты" ("U shapok yanychary imeli kity"), meaning "The Janissaries had braids hanging from their caps". In his 1967 book Rise of Russia, author Robert Wallace asserts that the term might mean a rough-hewn defensive bulwark made from woven wicker baskets filled with earth or rock – and thus Kitay-gorod means "Basket city". Kitay could also be derived from an old word for the wooden stakes used in construction of the quarter's walls. Gorod is simply the Russian word for "city", derived from the ancient gord.

Kitay (Russian: Китай) is also the modern Russian name for China, and is cognate with the name of the historic Khitan people of northeastern China. Kitay is thus cognate with the English Cathay.

== Walls ==
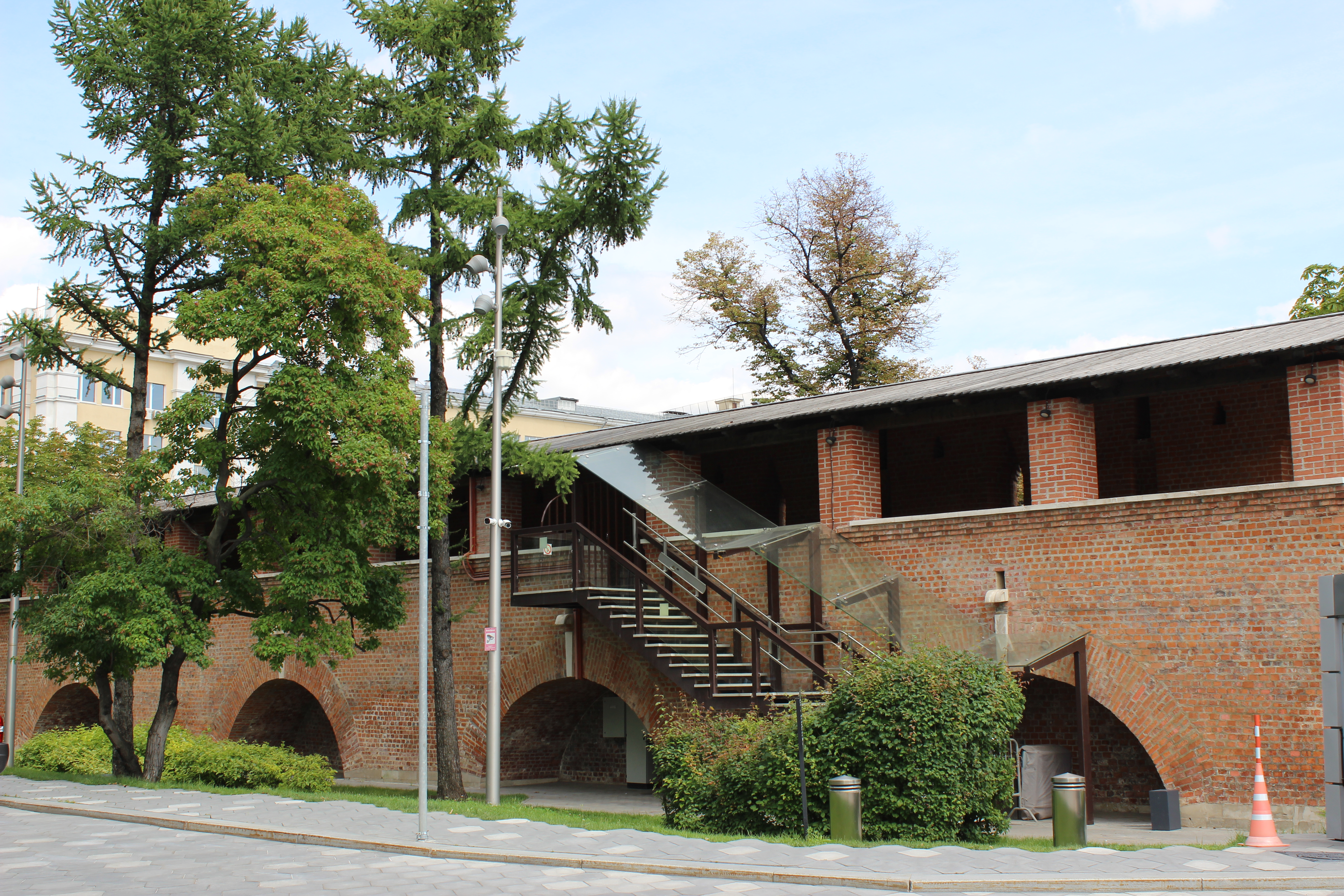
Surviving part of the wall in Zaryadye

The walls were erected from 1536 to 1539 by an Italian architect known under the Russified name Petrok Maly and originally featured 13 towers and six gates. All of the towers were demolished in the 1930s by the Soviet Union as part of Stalin's grand reconstruction of Moscow, with only small portions of the wall surviving that period. Since 1995 the wall has been partially rebuilt, and a new tower has been added. City officials plan to close Kitay-gorod to automobile traffic.

== Squares ==
Apart from the Red Square, the quarter is bordered by the chain of Central Squares of Moscow, notably "Theater Square" (named for its eponymous location in front of the Bolshoi Theatre), Lubyanka Square (in front of the KGB headquarters), and Slavyanskaya Square.

== Architecture ==
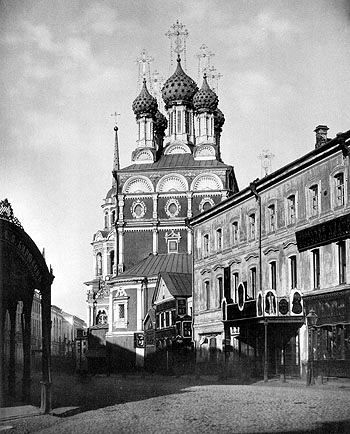
St. Nicholas Church on the Ilyinka (1680–1689), with its gold-starred blue domes, once dominated Kitay-gorod's skyline. It was demolished in 1933 by the Soviet Union.

Kitay-gorod, developing as a trading area, was known as a business area of Moscow. Its three main streets—Varvarka, Ilyinka, and Nikolskaya—are lined with banks, shops, and storehouses like the historicistic shopping mall GUM which confines Kitay-gorod towards Red Square.

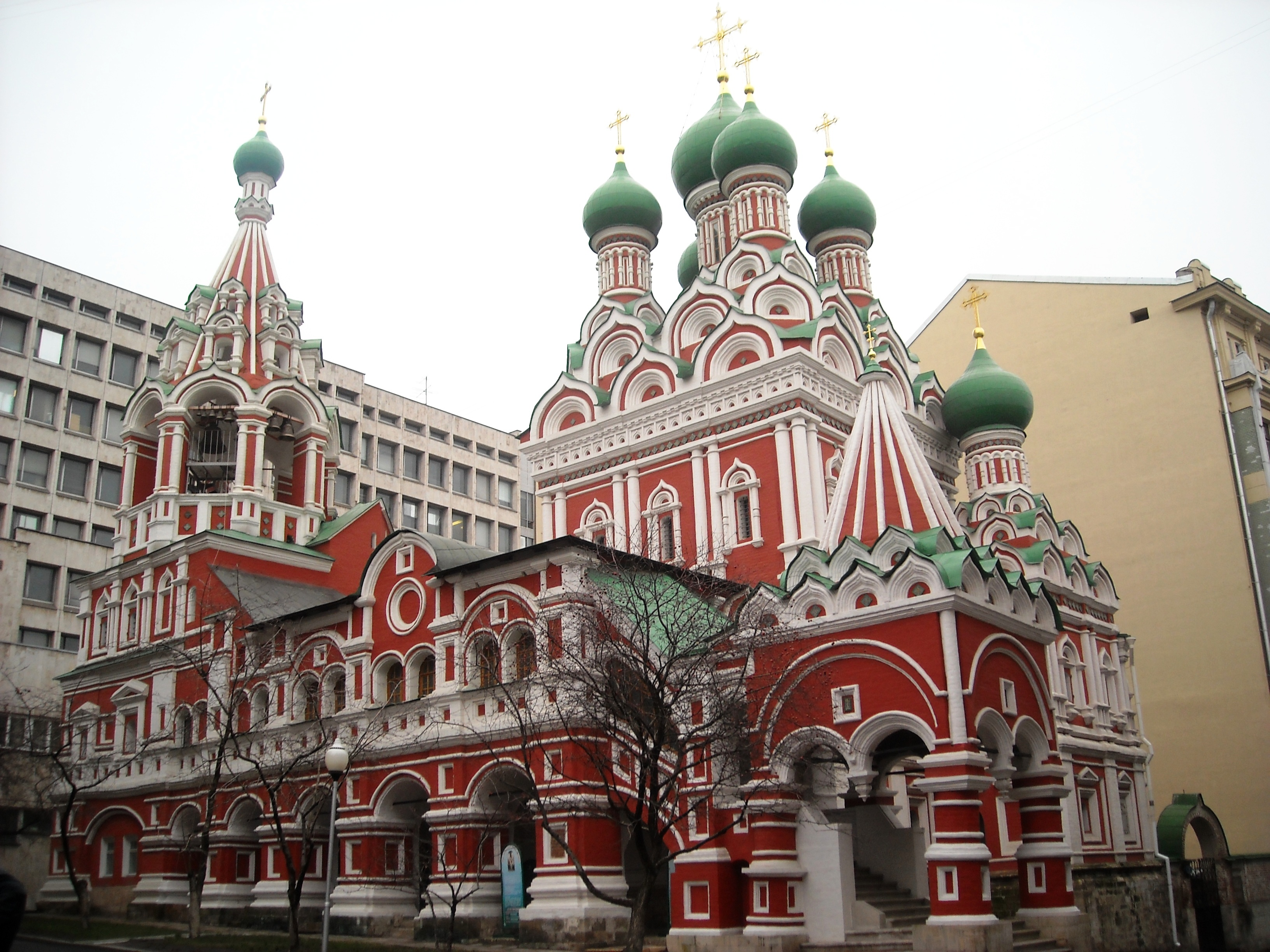
The church of the Trinity in Nikitniki, a masterpiece of 17th-century Russian architecture. It was destroyed in 1936, but rebuilt in the 1990s.

St. Nicholas Church on the Ilyinka (1680–89), informally known as the Great Cross, was a landmark in Kitay-gorod but was destroyed in 1933 on Stalin's orders. This district also features the Church of Cosmas and Damian and the Trinity Church of Nikitniki, which today is nestled among city buildings. It was built in the 1630s on the land of Moscow merchant, Grigory Nikitnikov.

Nikolskaya Street is the site of Moscow's first university, the Slavic Greek Latin Academy, housed in extant Zaikonospassky monastery (1660s). Another monastery cathedral, the main church of Epiphany Monastery (1690s), stands in the middle of Kitay-gorod in the eponymous Bogoyavlensky Lane.

In the 19th century, Red Square was lined by a neoclassical domed structure of Upper Trade Rows by Joseph Bove. In the 1890s it replaced with the new Upper Trading Rows (by Alexander Pomerantsev and Vladimir Shukhov) and the similar Middle Trading Rows (by Roman Klein). The rest of Kitay-gorod was densely filled with offices, warehouses and hotels, to the point where real estate developers had to build streets, not buildings—like the Tretyakovsky Proyezd project by Pavel Tretyakov and Alexander Kaminsky.

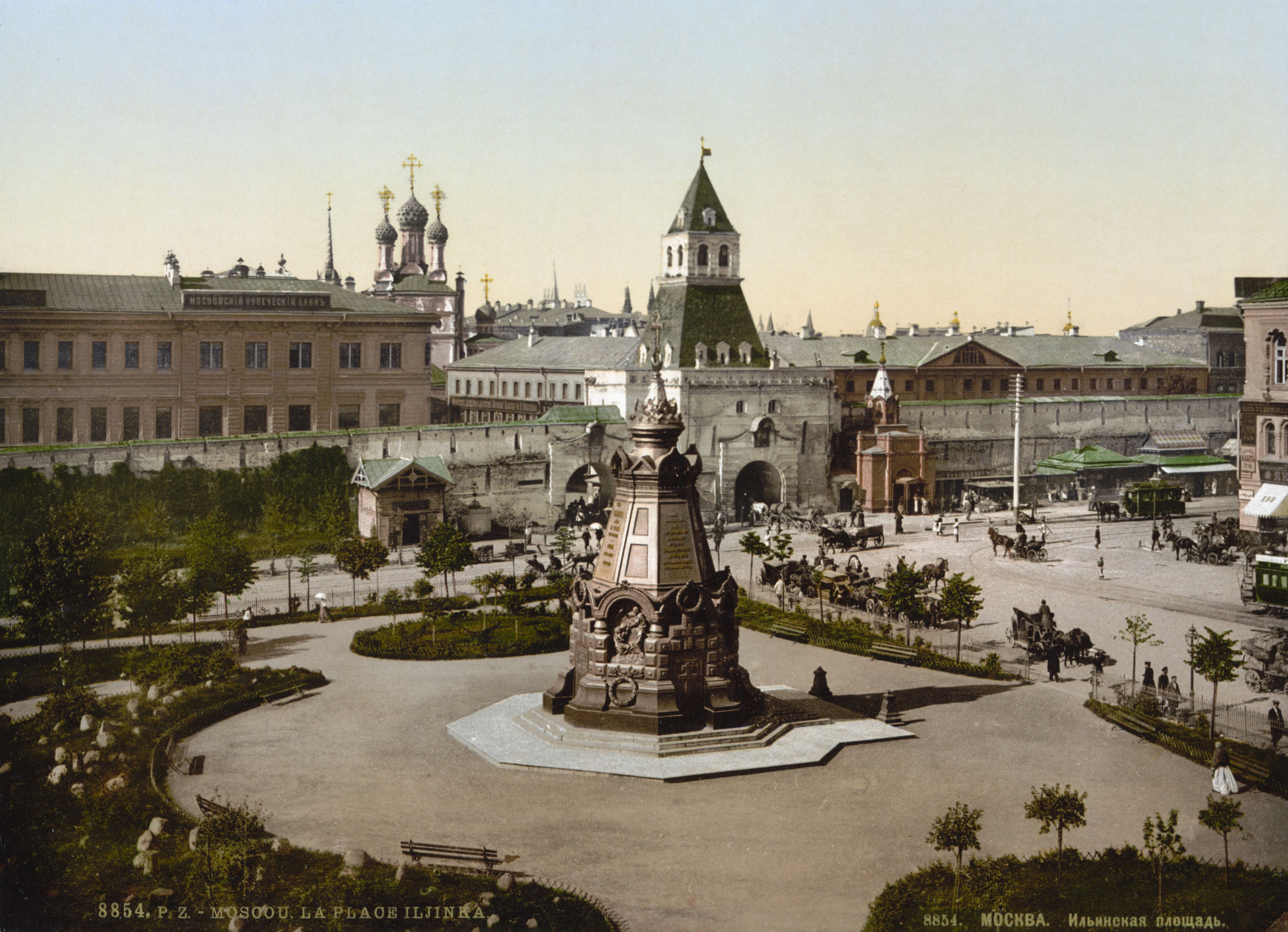
View of the Plevna Chapel and St Elijah's Gates to Kitay-gorod (ca. 1900). The parallel street right behind the wall is now Staraya Square. The Tower and the wall were demolished in the 1930s.

Also in the 1890s, developers consolidated large land lots on the perimeter of Kitay-gorod. Savva Mamontov launched a civic center, built around an opera hall, which was completed as the Metropol Hotel in 1907, the largest early Art Nouveau building in Moscow, containing artwork by Mikhail Vrubel, Alexander Golovin and Nikolai Andreev. The eastern segment (Staraya Square) was rebuilt by the Moscow Merchant Society, with the late Art Nouveau Boyarsky Dvor offices (by Fyodor Schechtel) and the neoclassical 4, Staraya Square (by Vladimir Sherwood, Jr., 1912–1914) which housed the Central Committee of the Communist Party after the Bolshevik Revolution.

The present-day offices and clock tower of Constitutional Court of Russia were financed by the Northern Insurance Society (1910–1912) and built by Ivan Rerberg, Marian Peretiatkovich and Vyacheslav Oltarzhevsky.

== Destruction during the Soviet era ==
All 10 chapels, 7 out of 18 parish churches, the Cathedral of the Nikolo-Greek Monastery, and two monastery bell towers were demolished in Kitay-gorod in the 1920s and 1930s by the Soviet government. After the destruction of the ancient wall with fortress towers, Kitay-gorod lost its borders and outlines, and in the mid-30s, with the renaming of the main streets after communist revolutionaries and politicians, the ancient toponymy was also destroyed. The last pre-war victim of Kitay-gorod was the Kazan Cathedral, demolished in 1936, which stood on the corner of Nikolskaya Street and the Red Square.

Starting from 1990, the original names of the streets were restored, but most of the cultural heritage cannot be rebuilt.

== Zaryadye ==
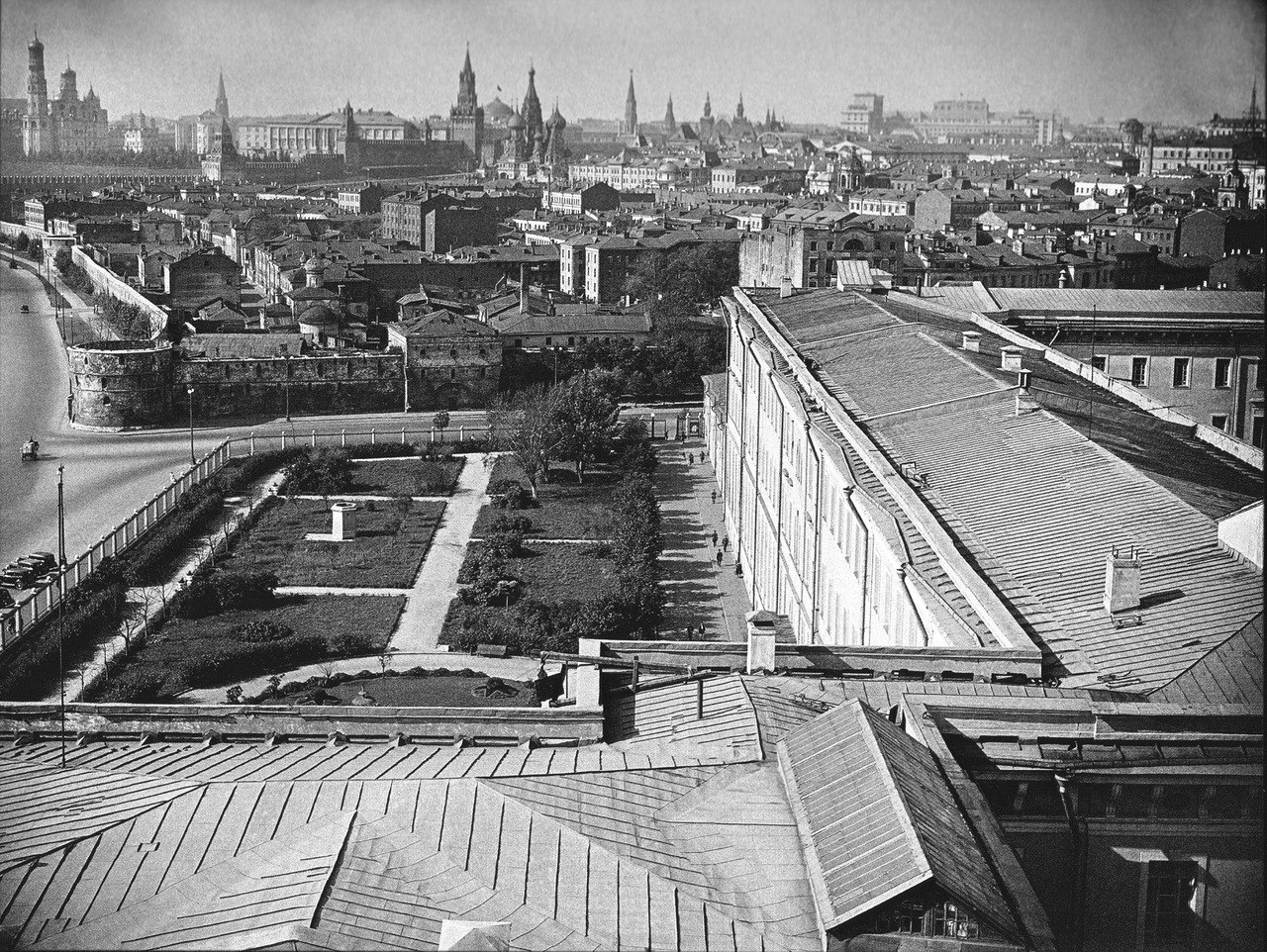
Kosmodemyanskya Gates and Naugolnaya (Corner) Tower in Zaryadye in the 1930s prior to their demolition.

A whole quarter of Kitay-gorod adjacent to the Moskva River and known as Zaryadye was demolished in three rounds (1930s, late 1940s, 1960s) by the Soviet Union, sparing only those structures that were deemed "historic monuments" by Joseph Stalin. These include the Cathedral of the Sign (1679–84), the Church of All Saints (1680s), St. George's Church on Pskov Hill (1657), St. Maksim's Church (1698), St. Anna's Church at the Corner (1510s), St. Barbara's Church (1796–1804), the Old English Embassy (1550s), and the 16th century Romanov boyar residence. The district's main structure, Rossiya Hotel (built in 1967), was dismantled in 2007 to make space for the new Zaryadye Park which was opened in 2017.

== Gallery ==
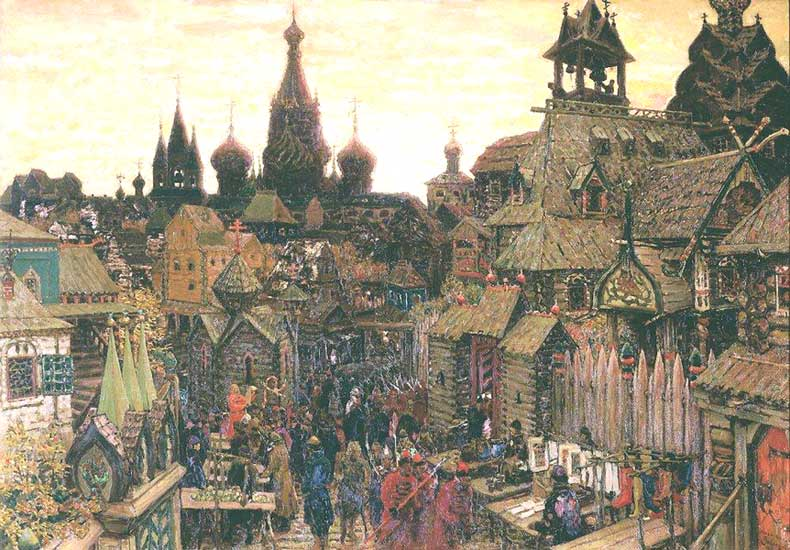
A 1922 painting by A. Vasnetsov, depicting a street in Kitay-gorod in the 17th century

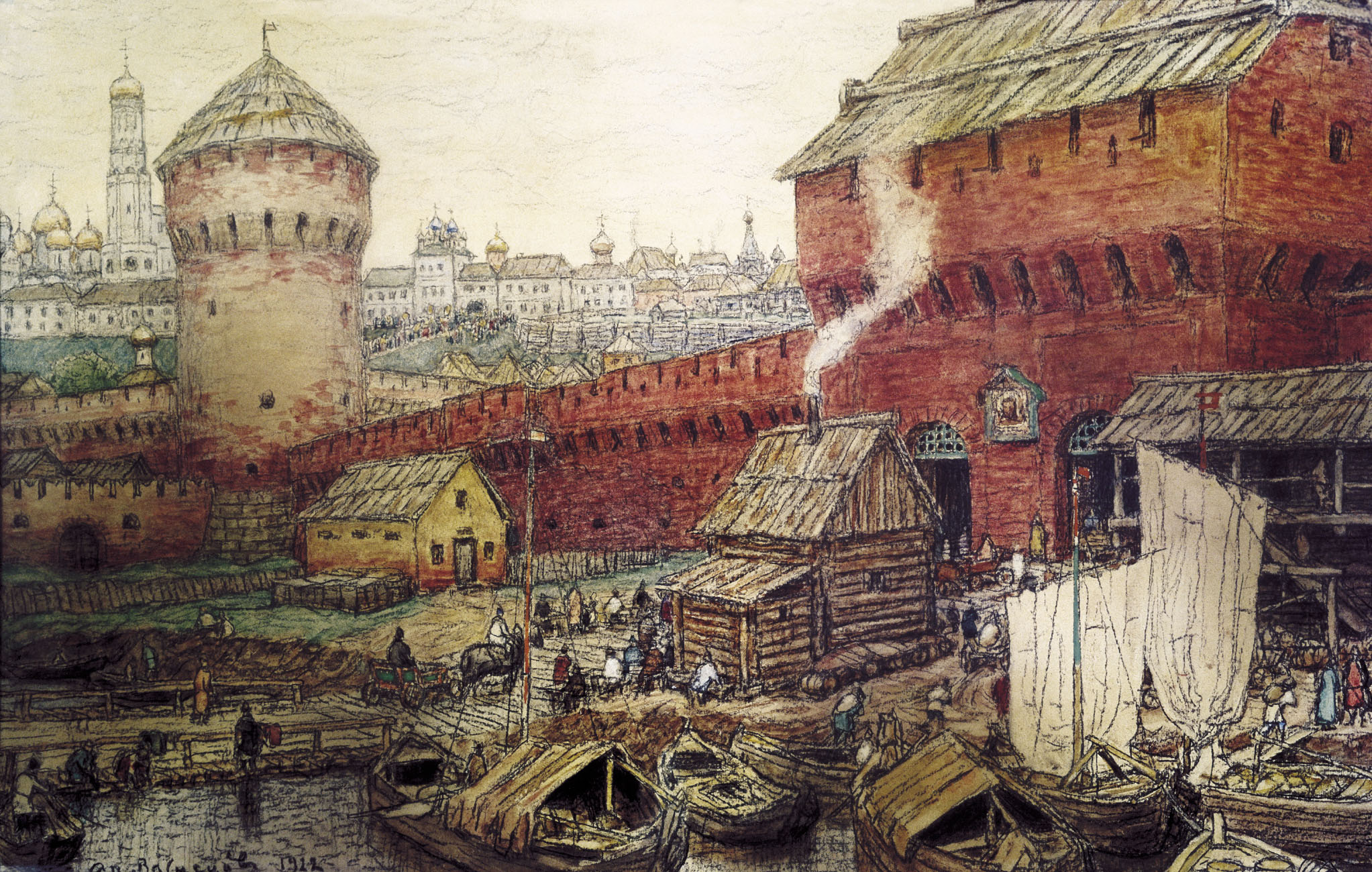
A. Vasnetsov. Spasskiye/Wodyaniye (Savior/Water) gates of Kitay-gorod in the 17th century

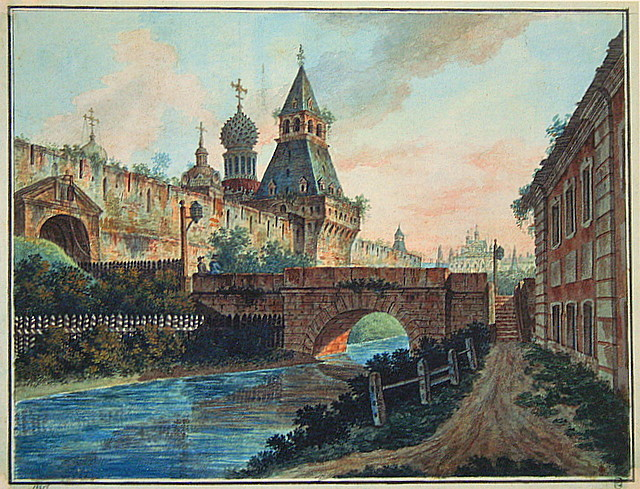
Nikolskiye (St. Nikolay's) Gates and breaching gates, c. 1800

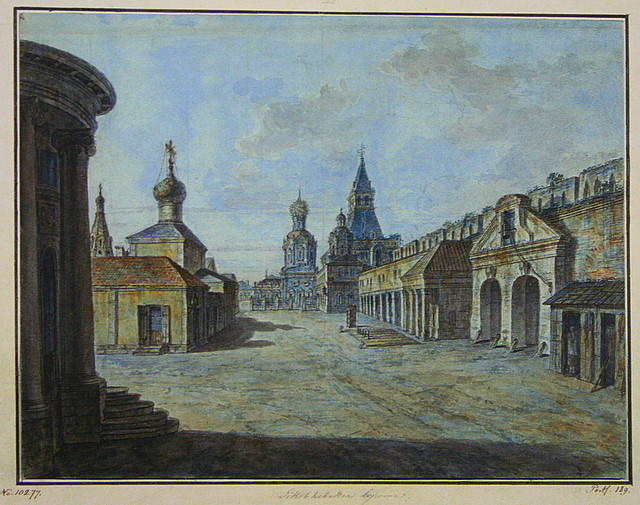
Novaya square, c. 1800

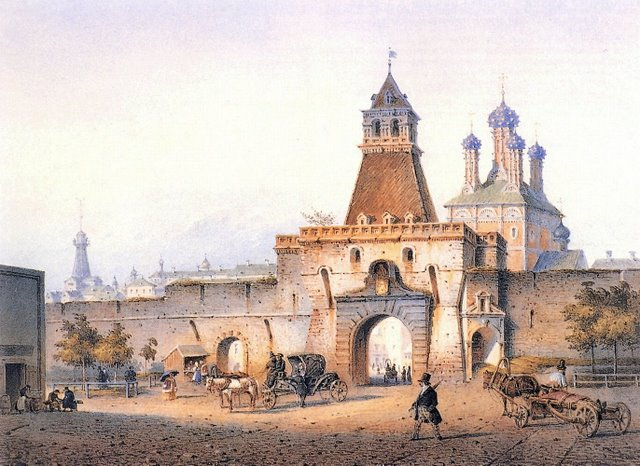
Ilyinskye (St. Elijah's) gates, 1840s

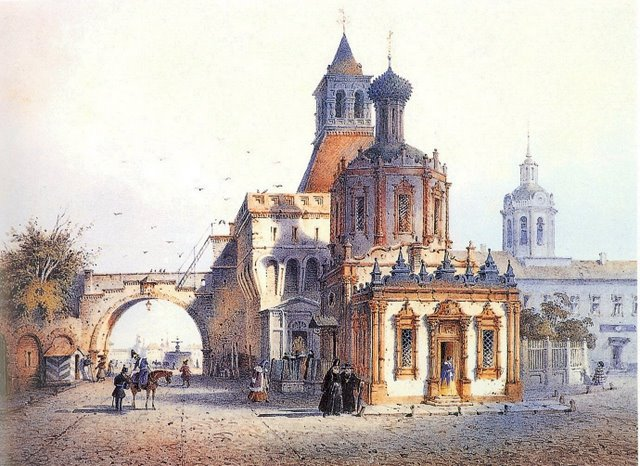
Nikolskiye/Vladimirskiye (St. Nikolay's/St. Vladimir's) Gates, 1840s

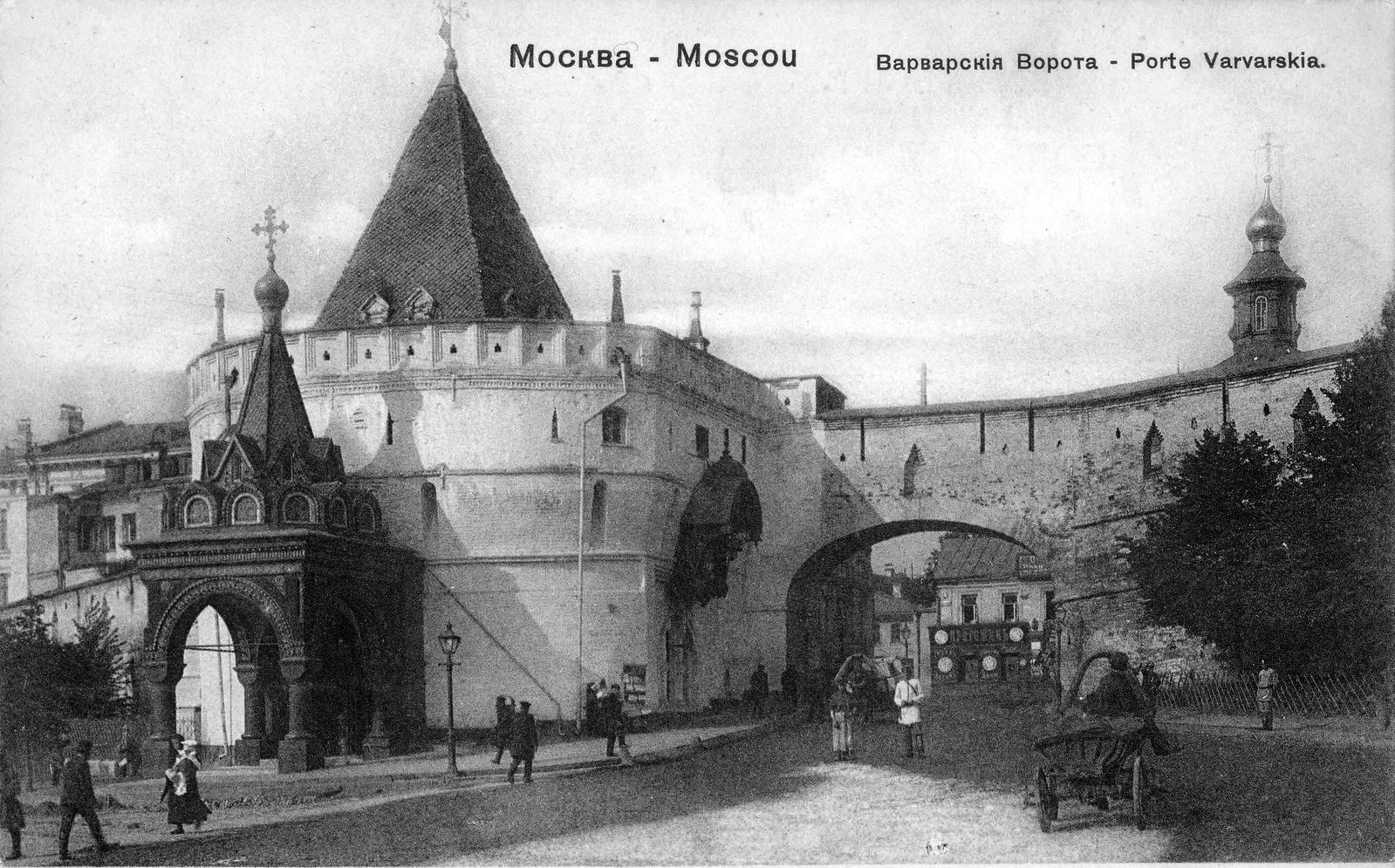
Varvarskye (St. Barbara's) gates, 1880s

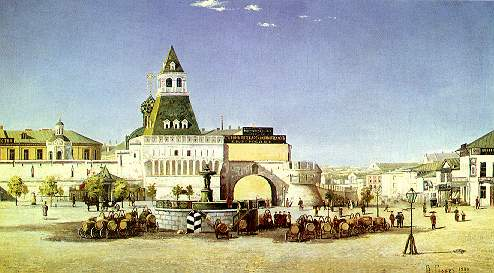
Nikolskiye/Vladimirskiye Gates and Lubianka Square, 1880

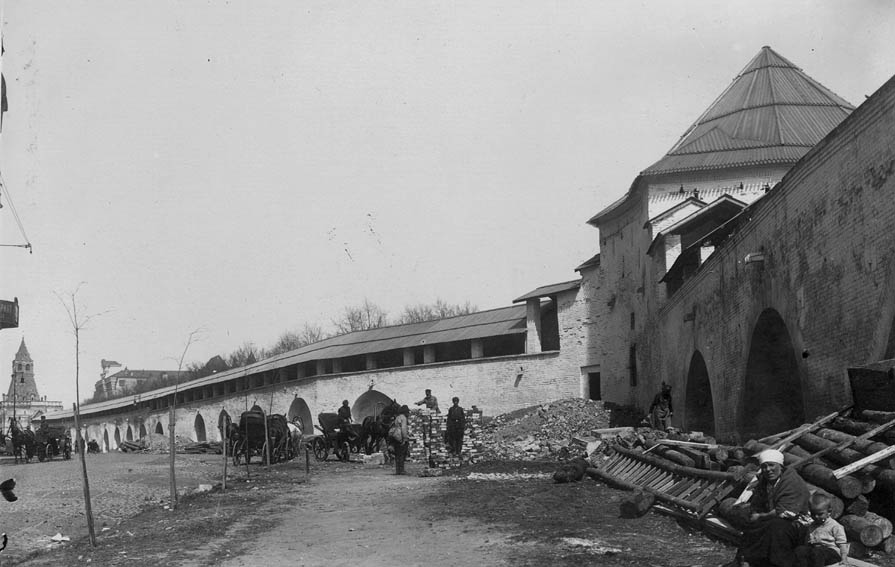
Kitay-gorod wall in the 1920s

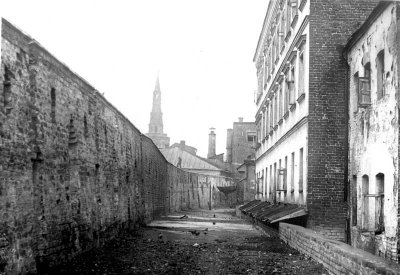
Kitai-gorod wall in Zaryadye, 1934

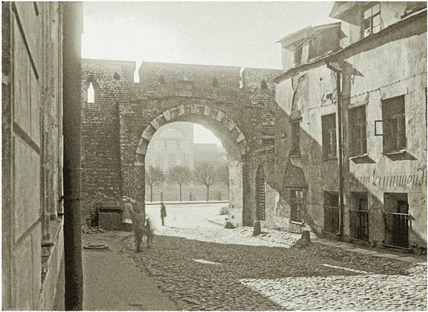
Breaching gates in Zaryadye, 1934

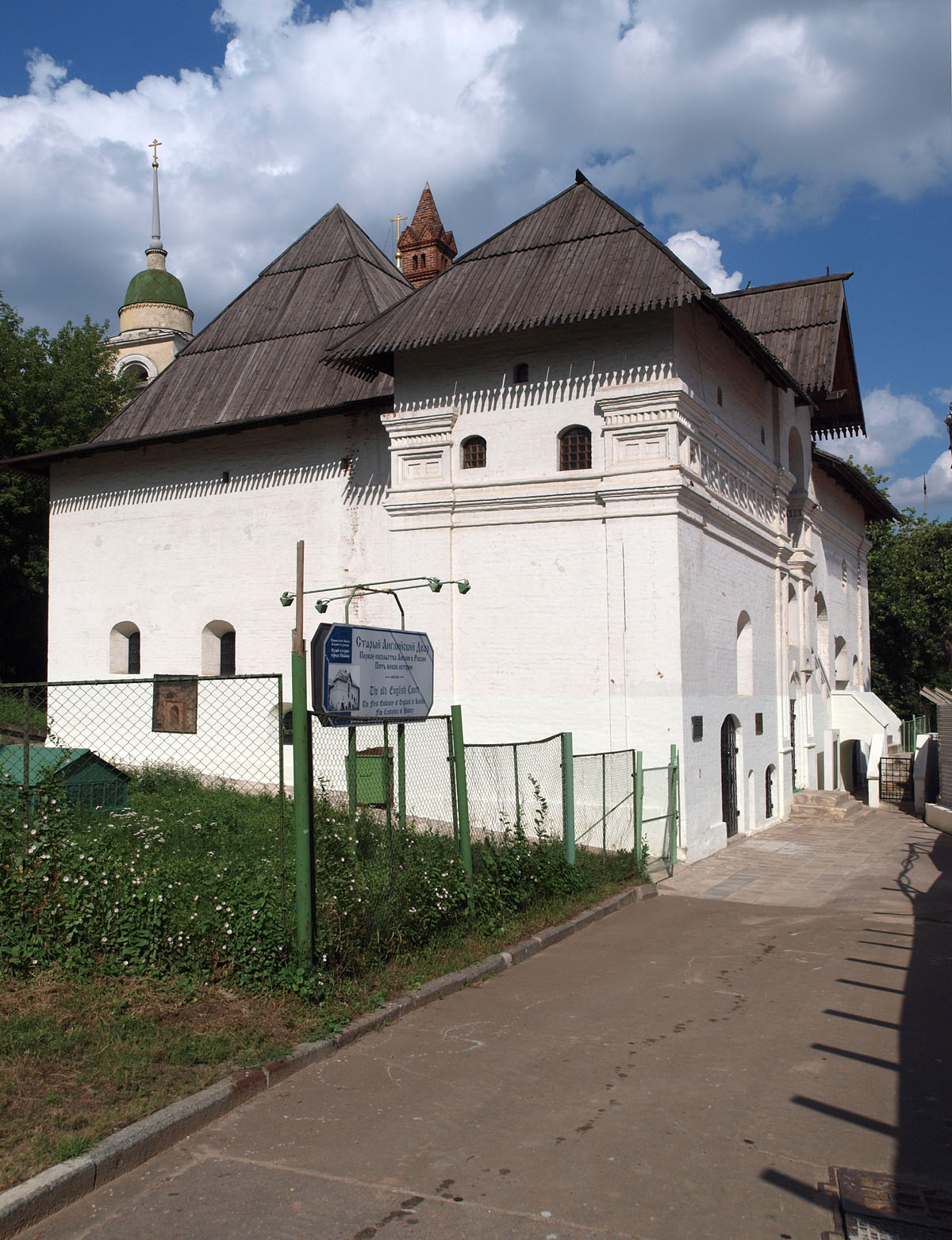
The Old English Court

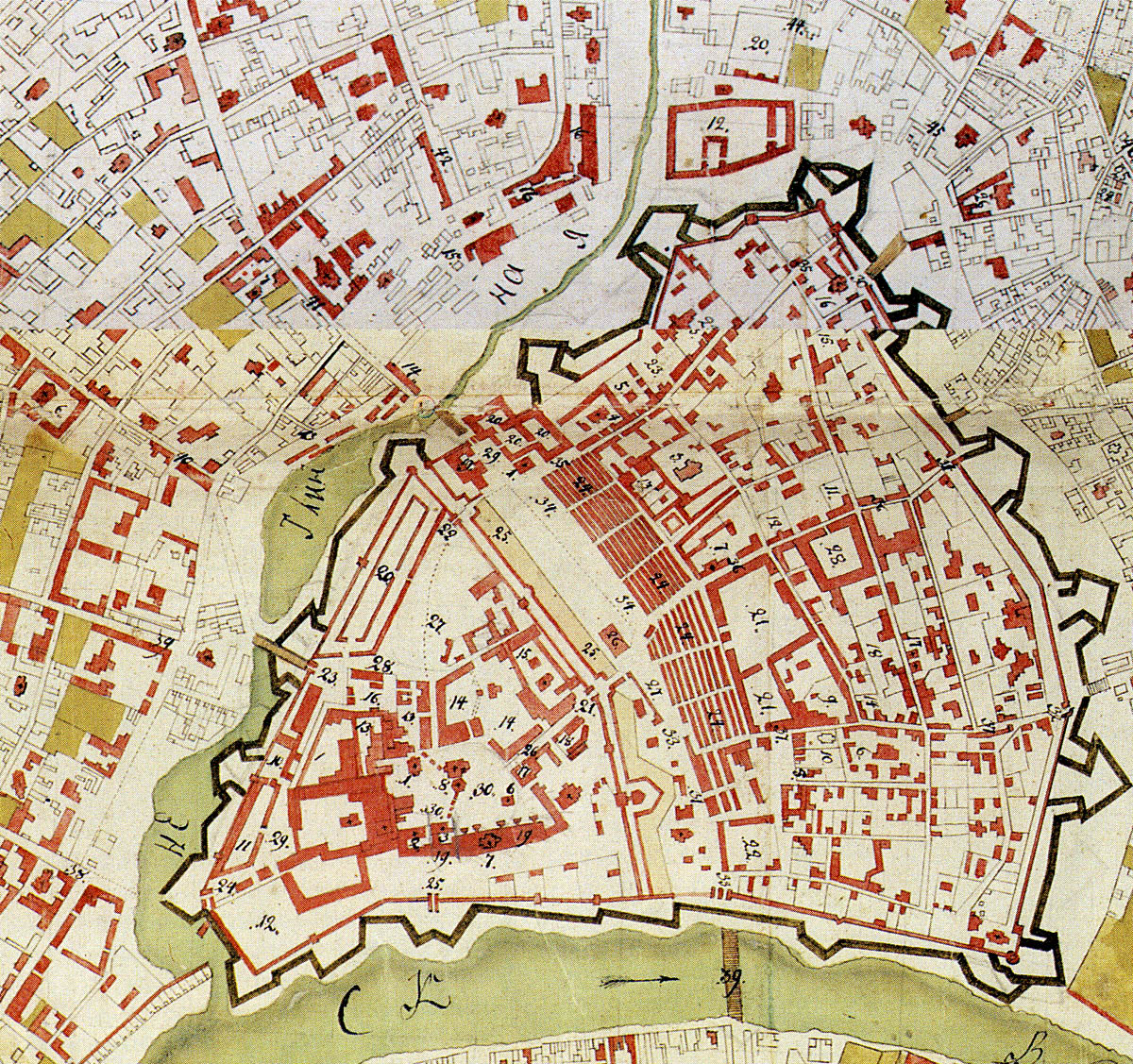
Old map of the Kitay-gorod showing the walls in black
