= Church of Cosmas and Damian, Moscow =

St Cosmas and St Damian Church
- Церковь Космы и Дамиана в Старых Панех
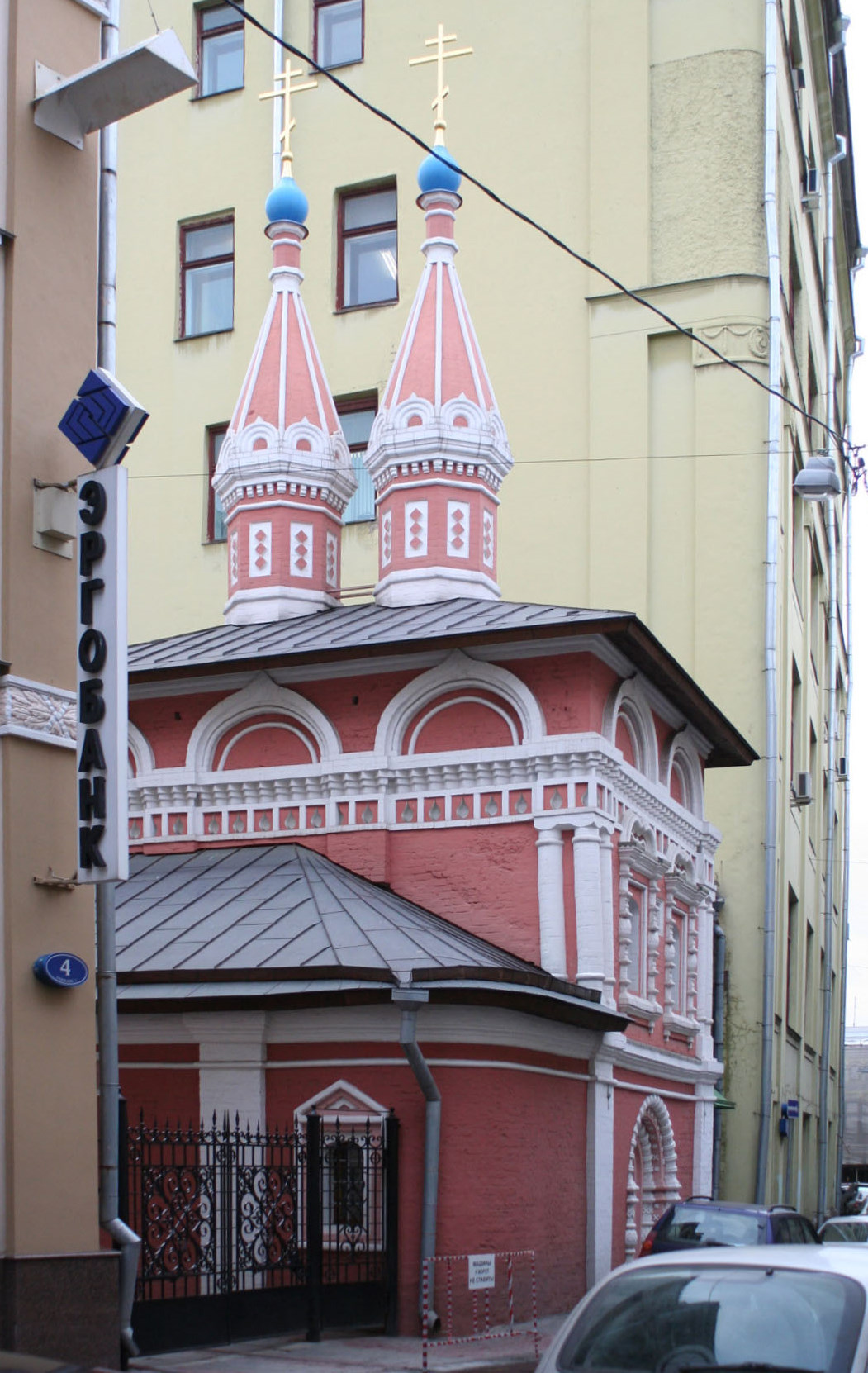
- St Cosmas and St Damian Church in Old Panei, (north façade)
- St Cosmas and St Damian Church
- 55°45′22″N 37°37′34″E
- Location: Moscow
- Country: Russia
- Denomination: Russian Orthodox

History
- Founded: 1462 (wooden), 1564 in stone
- Dedication: Saints Cosmas and Damian

Architecture
- Functional status: Active
- Style: Russian

The Church of Saints Cosmas and Damian in Old Panei (Russian: Церковь Космы и Дамиана в Старых Панех), is a Russian Orthodox church dedicated to the twin Saints Cosmas and Damian, Christian martyrs of the 4th century.

It is located in the Kitay-gorod, in Moscow, Russia. In the 16th-17th century. Since 1508 it was a location of the Polish diplomatic mission in Russia, since that time this place called Pany or Stary Pany.

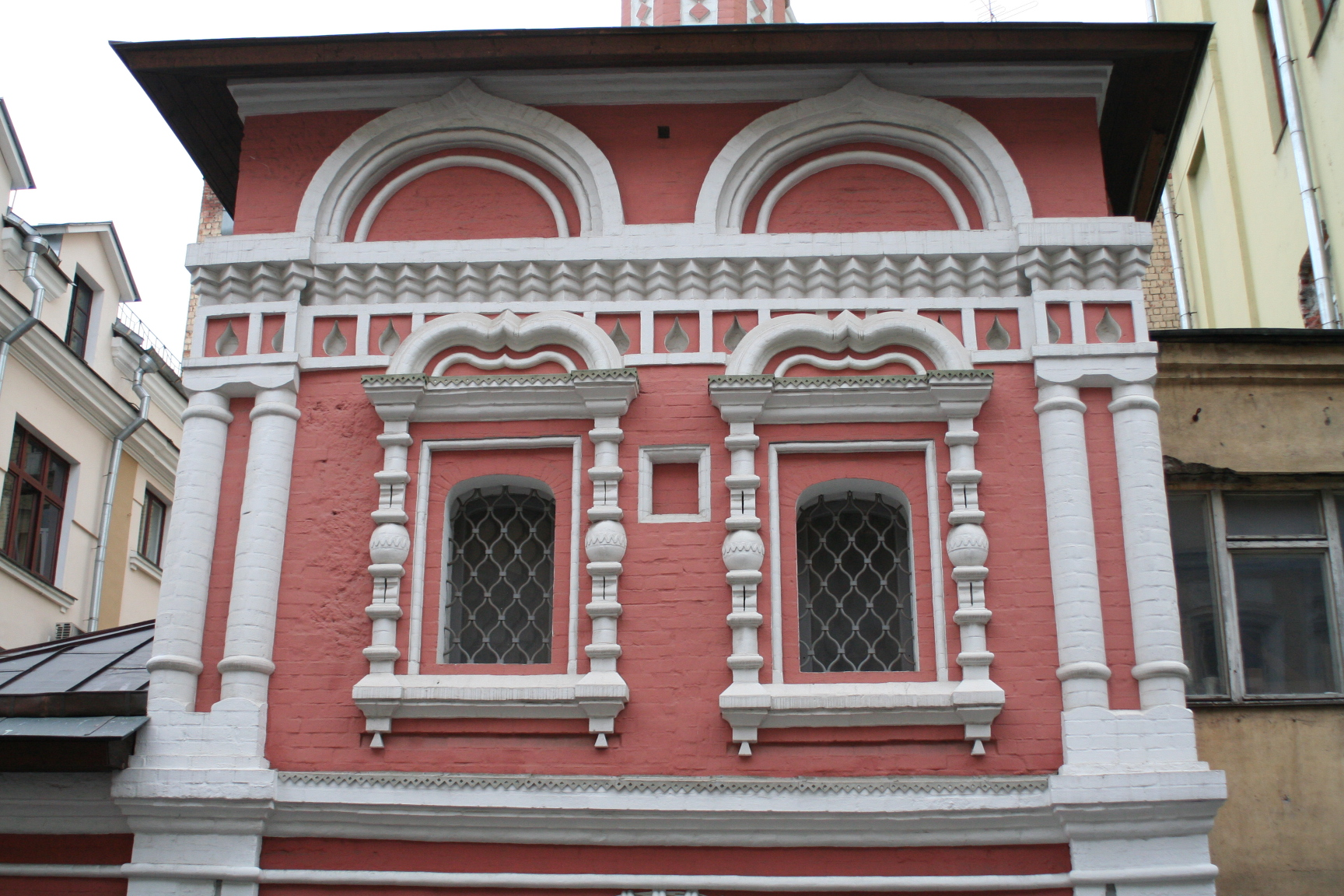
St Cosmas and St Damian Church.

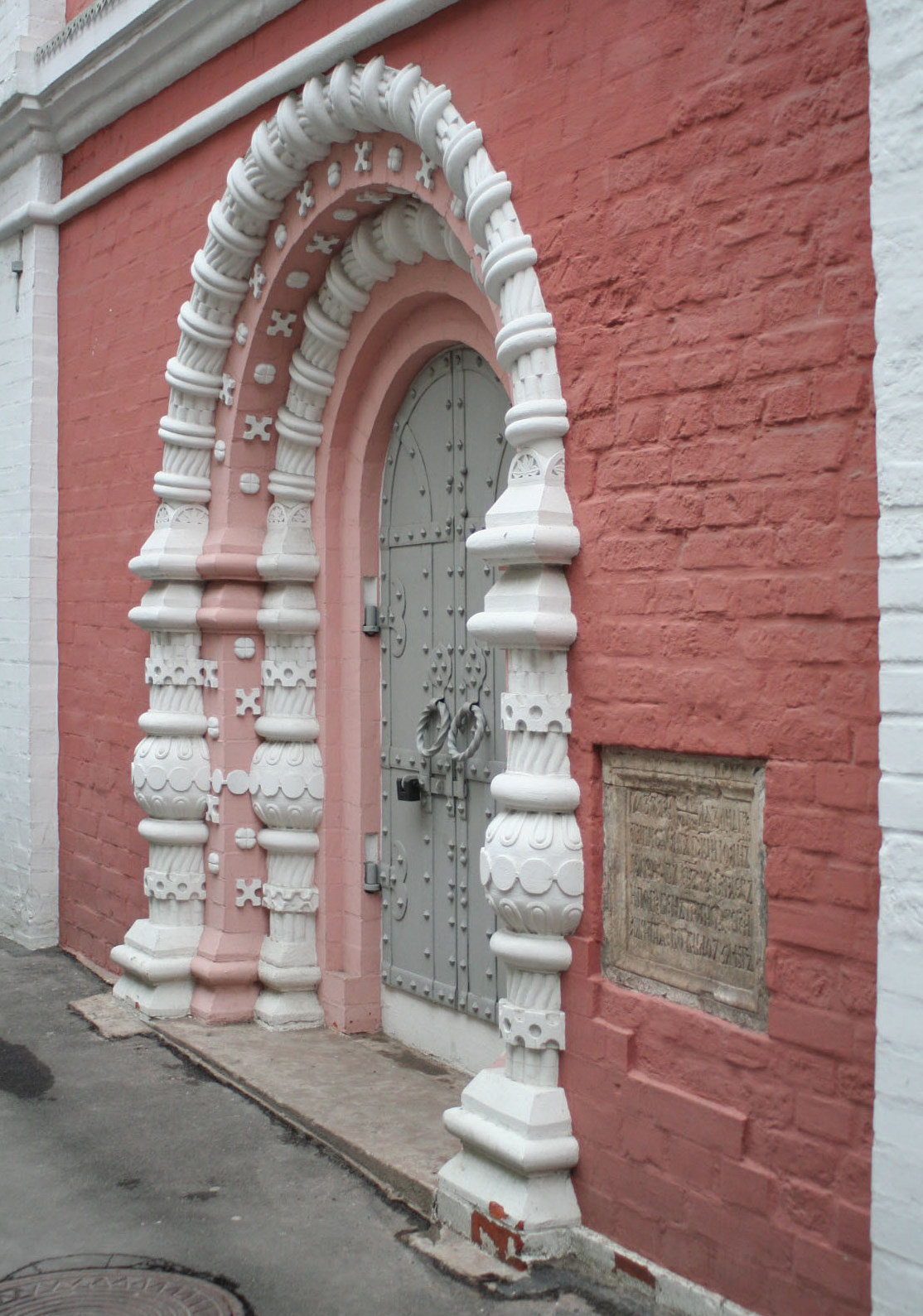
St Cosmas and St Damian Church.

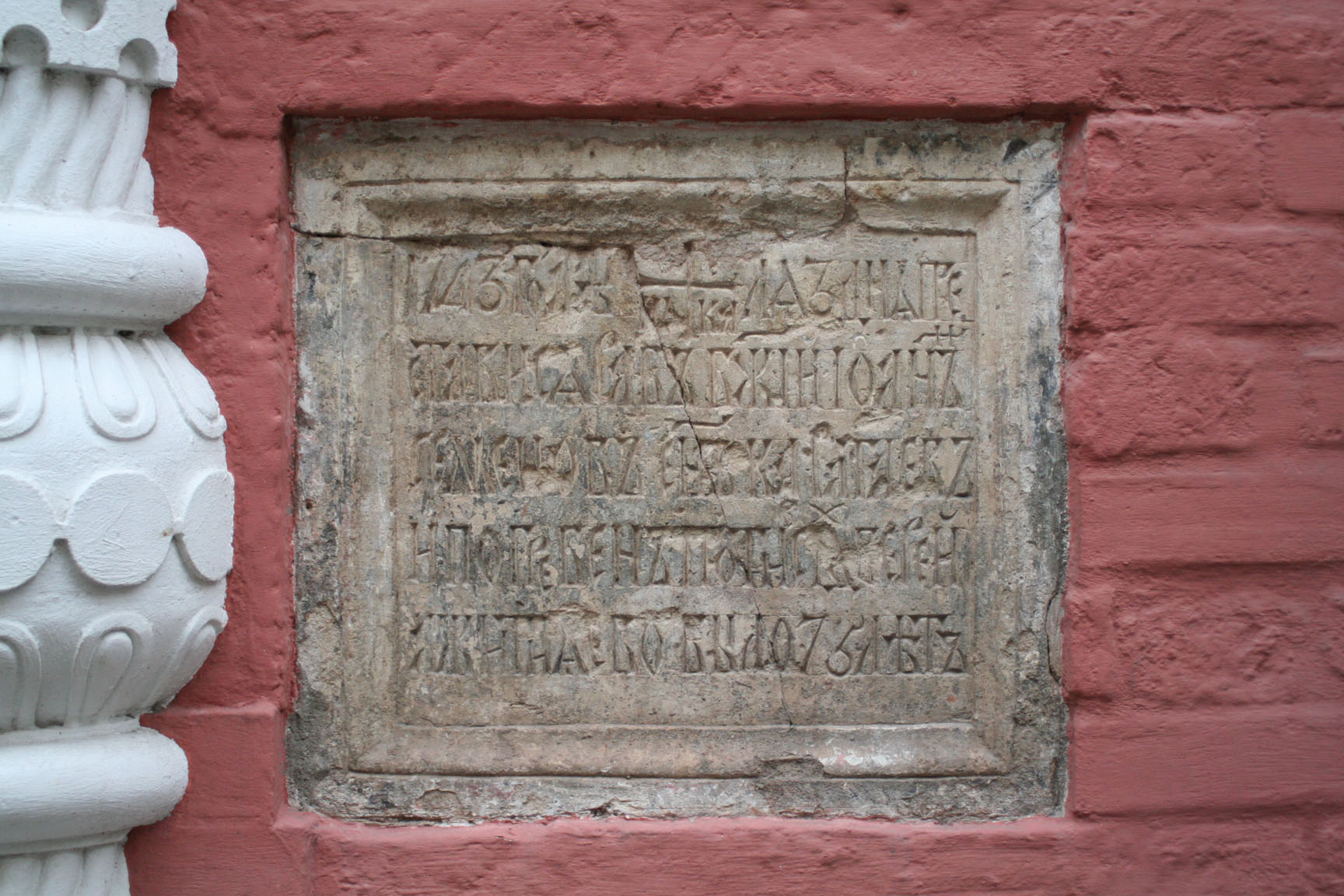
St Cosmas and St Damian Church.

== See also ==
- Saints Cosmas and Damian
