= Slavic Greek Latin Academy =

Historical academic institution

Coordinates: 55°45′23.8″N 37°37′16.8″E

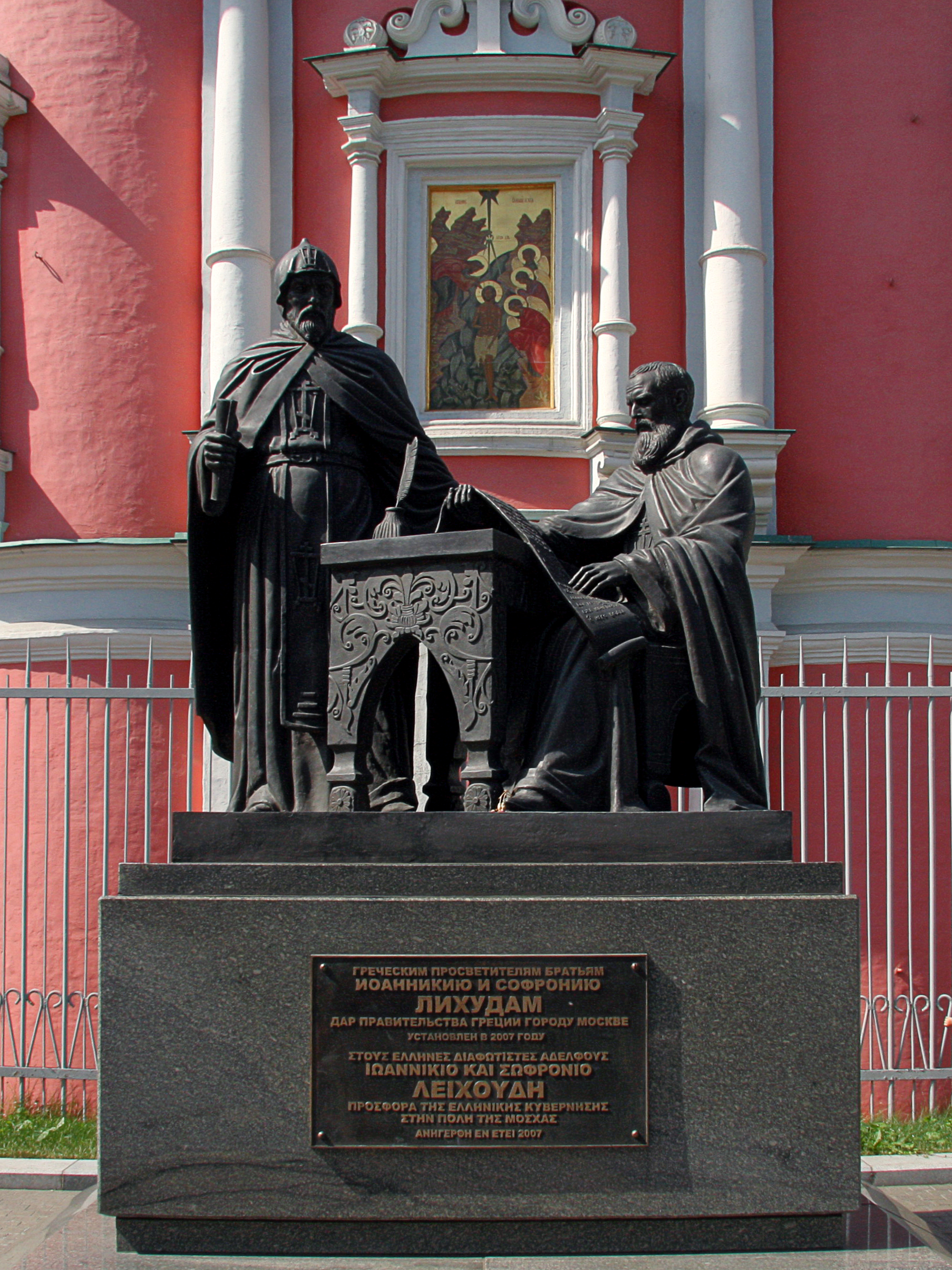
A bronze statue of the Greek Likhud brothers, the founders of the academy, stands in front of Epiphany Monastery in Moscow. Date of origin: 1685. Official website: https://sgla.ru/about_sgla/

The Slavic Greek Latin Academy (Russian: Славяно-греко-латинская академия) was the first higher education establishment in Moscow.

== History ==
=== Beginning ===
The academy's establishment may be viewed as a result of the incorporation of the Left-Bank Ukraine into Muscovy after the Treaty of Pereyaslav. Under Fyodor Rtishchev's auspices, Epiphanius Slavinetsky and other learned monks moved from Kiev to Moscow. The Ukrainian and Polish influence was paramount at the court of Tsar Feodor III. In 1682, he signed the academy's charter (priviley), which had been elaborated by Sylvester Medvedev.

The academy was organized in 1685-1687 under the guidance of two Greek brothers Joannicus and Sophronius Likhud on the premises of the Zaikonospassky Monastery with over 70 students. The academy was placed under the care of the Patriarch Prikaz. The curriculum was divided into levels ("schools"), including Slavonic and Greek writing, seven liberal arts (septem artes liberales), and theology.

The academy itself was named the "Greek Latin School", or "Spassky schools" (Спасские школы). After the dismissal of the Likhud brothers in nd Nikolay Semyonov (Golovin) became teachers at the academy. By the beginning of the 18th century, there had been more than 200 students at the Slavic Greek Latin Academy. In 1701, Peter the Great turned it into a state academy. A celibate priest Palladius (Rogovsky), president of the academy, invited the graduates of Lvov and Kiev seminaries (so-called "brotherhood schools"), familiar with educational practices of Western Europe, to teach at the Slavic Greek Latin Academy. After that, the Latin language became the principal teaching language of the establishment.

=== Organization ===
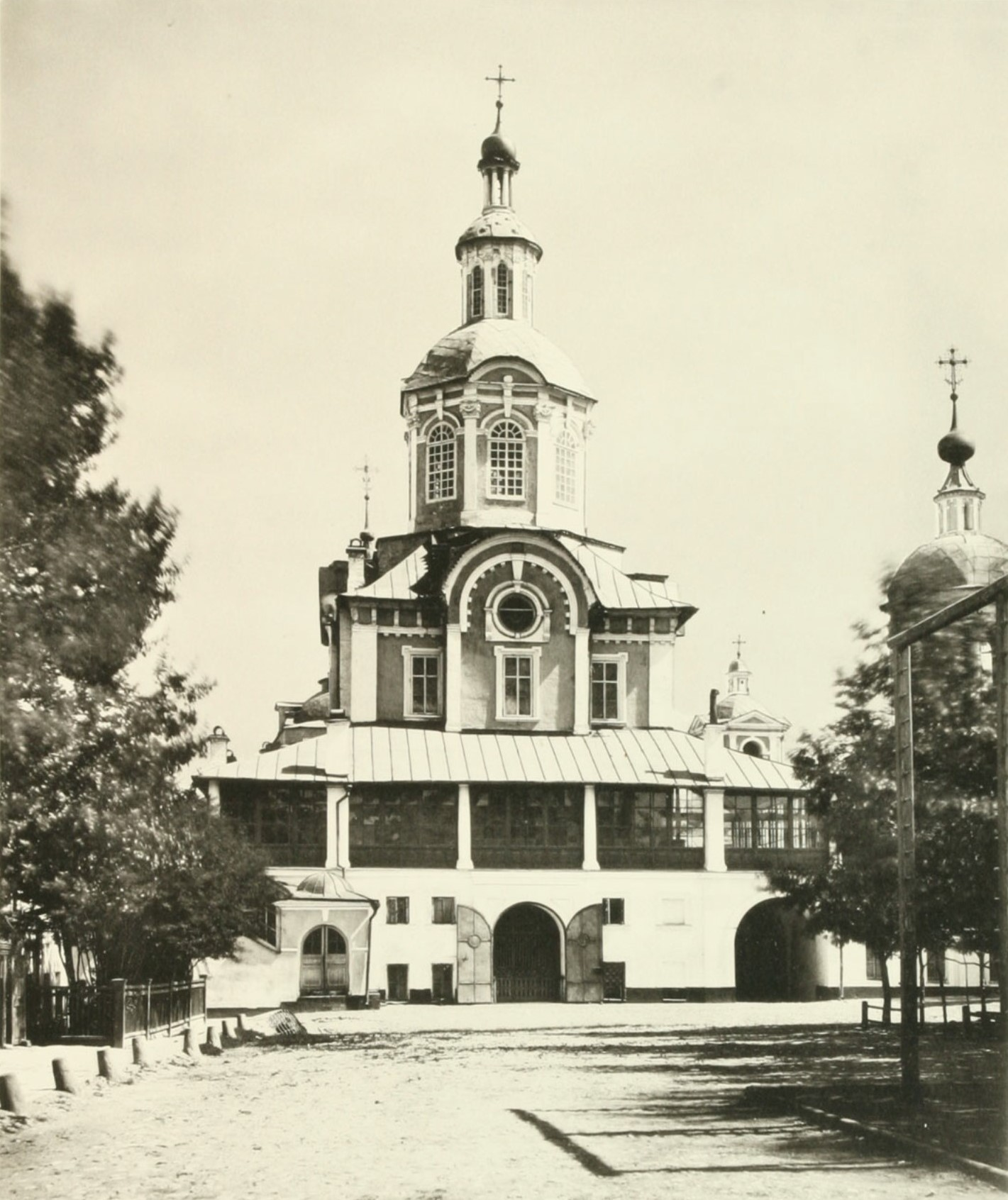
Zaikonospassky monastery, where the academy used to be located.

The curriculum consisted of two major stages, including elementary stage (grammar, arithmetics, geography, history, languages, dogmatism or theology) and highest stage (theory of poetry, rhetorics, philosophy, theology). The whole educational process lasted for 12 to 15 years. The education itself was similar to that of Western European universities. The Slavic Greek Latin Academy produced not only theologians, but specialists for civil service, as well, such as medical professionals and translators. During the reign of Peter the Great, the academy began to gradually turn into a higher theological educational establishment, as opposed to many new secular professional schools. In 1721, the Slavic Greek Latin Academy was transferred under the care of the Most Holy Synod.

=== In the 18th century ===
Throughout the first half of the 18th century, among its graduates were the first Russian academicians Mikhail Lomonosov and Vasily Trediakovsky, poet Antioch Kantemir, architect Vasili Bazhenov, geographer Stepan Krasheninnikov, chemist Dmitry Vinogradov.

When Platon II was elected Metropolitan of Moscow (1775), new disciplines were introduced into the academic curriculum, such as law, ecclesiastic history, medicine, broadened selection of ancient and new European languages. Publishing activities were also revived, including popular books on Orthodox Christianity for children. In 1775, the Slavic Greek Latin Academy became the official name of the academy. It worked together with the Troitskaya theological seminary of the Troitse-Sergiyeva Lavra. In 1814, the Slavic Greek Latin Academy was transformed into the Ecclesiastical Academy (Theological Academy) and relocated to the Troitse-Sergieva Lavra.

=== In the 19th century ===
In the 19th century the academy continued as the principal theological school of the Russian Orthodox Church. Among its professors were the historian Vasily Klyuchevsky and the Christian philosopher Pavel Florensky. Since 1892 the academy has been publishing the journal on Russian Orthodoxy - Bogoslovsky vestnik (formerly edited by Gorsky-Platonov and Pavel Florensky).

=== Soviet period ===
The Bolsheviks closed the academy in Troitse-Sergieva Lavra in 1918. Some professors of the academy (including its former rector Archbishop Theodore (Pozdeevsky), professors I.V. Popov and Pavel Florensky) moved to the informal Higher Theological School in Moscow, but there were only a few students left.

In September 1943, at the peak of World War II, Soviet leader Joseph Stalin met three metropolitans (Sergius, Alexis and Nicholas) of the Russian Orthodox Church and established the new policy of cooperation with the Orthodox Church. He promised to formally recognize and reopen the Higher Theological School. The promised school was opened as the Theological Institute in the Novodevichy Convent on June 14, 1944. It was the first official theologian school allowed in the Soviet Union. The program was prepared by Gregory (Chukov), Archbishop of Saratov and its first rector was S.V. Savinsky.

In 1946 the Theological Institute was transformed into the Moscow Seminary and Moscow Theological Academy. In 1947 the academy gained the right to award theological degrees of Candidate, Doctor and Professor. In 1949 the Moscow Theological Academy was allowed to reclaim its original buildings at the Troitse-Sergieva Lavra, where they teach theological students to the present time. Most of the present bishops and theologians of Russian Orthodox Church have graduated from the academy.

== Structure ==
Departments, institutes and research centers as structural units and individual entities include:

- Open Institute of Business Administration
- Open Institute of jurisprudence
- Open Institute of International Relations
- Open Institute of Public Administration
- Open Institute of Theology (Orthodox theology)
- Open Institute of Psychology
- Open Institute of jurisprudence
- Open Institute of Business Administration
- Open Institute of Foreign Languages
- Open Institute of Information Technology
- Public Management Institute
- Open Institute of Economics and Finance
- Open Institute of Marketing and Advertising

Training is conducted in more than 150 profiles and areas of B.A, M.A and additional vocational training.
