= Sylvester Medvedev =

Russian religious writer (1641–1691)

Sylvester (Russian: Сильвестр, romanized: Silvestr; secular name: Simeon Agafonovich Medvedev; 6 February 1641 – 21 February 1691) was a Russian writer, poet, and theologian. He was a student of Simeon of Polotsk.

== Life ==
Sylvester was born in Kursk; he was first a podyachy in Kursk and then Moscow.

In 1665, he entered the newly established Slavic Greek Latin Academy of Simeon of Polotsk (1629–1680) in the Zaikonospassky Monastery, where he learnt Latin, poetics and rhetoric. After Simeon's death, Sylvester re-established the school. In 1687, the school and the printing press schools were merged to form the Slavic Greek Latin Academy.

Sylvester supported Sophia (r. 1682–1689) during her regency and promoted the Roman Catholic understanding of the Eucharist, which led to theological disputes during the 1680s. In 1690, a sobor of the Russian Orthodox Church condemned the views of the Westernizing party. After Sophia's overthrow, Sylvester was executed for high treason against Tsar Peter I. He was buried at the Zaikonospassky Monastery.

== See also ==
- Karion Istomin

== Sources ==
- "Сильвестр, настоятель Заиконоспасского монастыря" . Brockhaus and Efron Encyclopedic Dictionary (in Russian). 1906.
