= Vasily Klyuchevsky =

Russian historian (1841–1911)

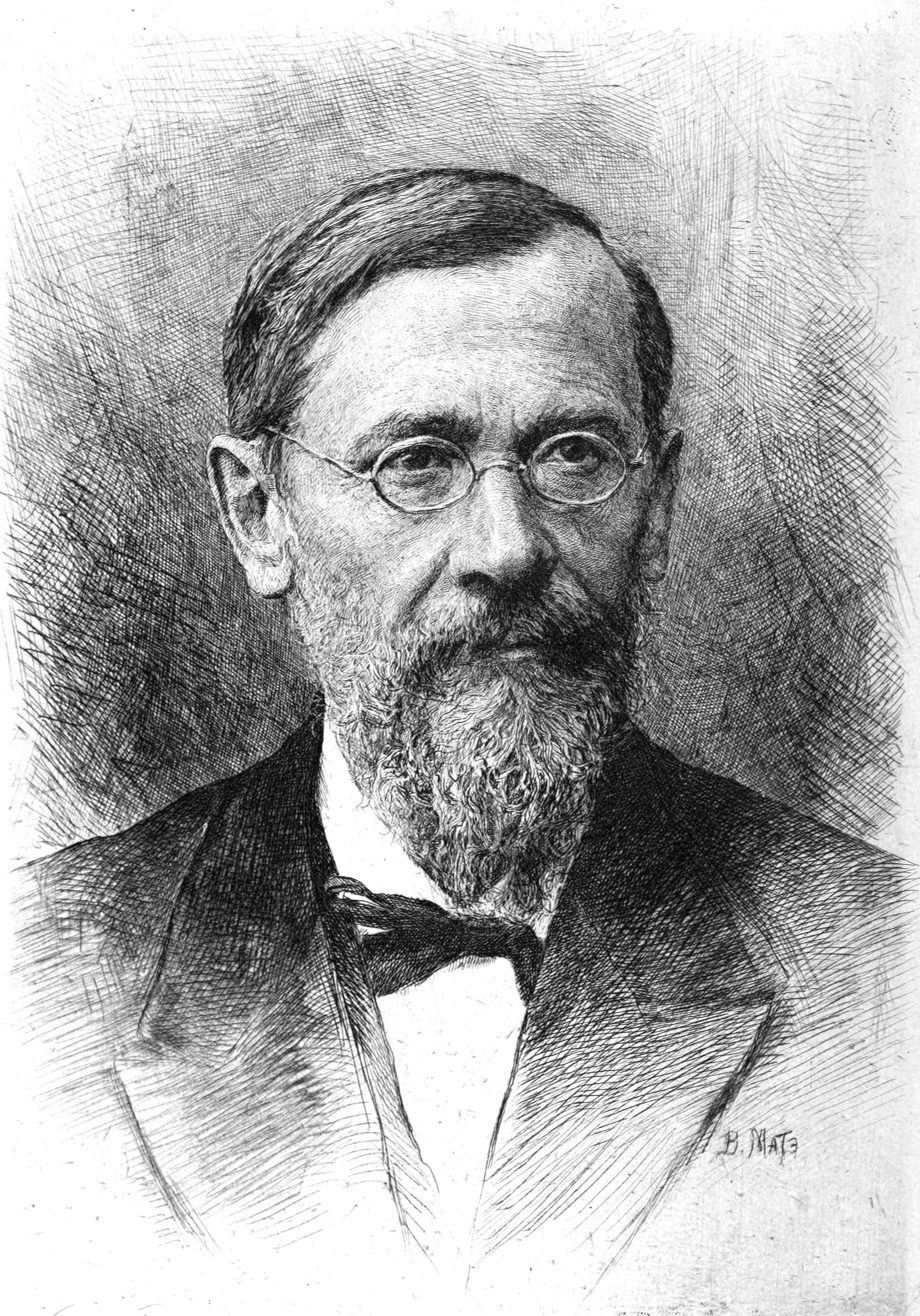
- Born: 28 January 1841; Penza Governorate, Russia
- Died: 25 May 1911 (aged 70); Moscow, Russia
- Title: Doctor of Science (1882)

Academic background
- Education: Imperial Moscow University

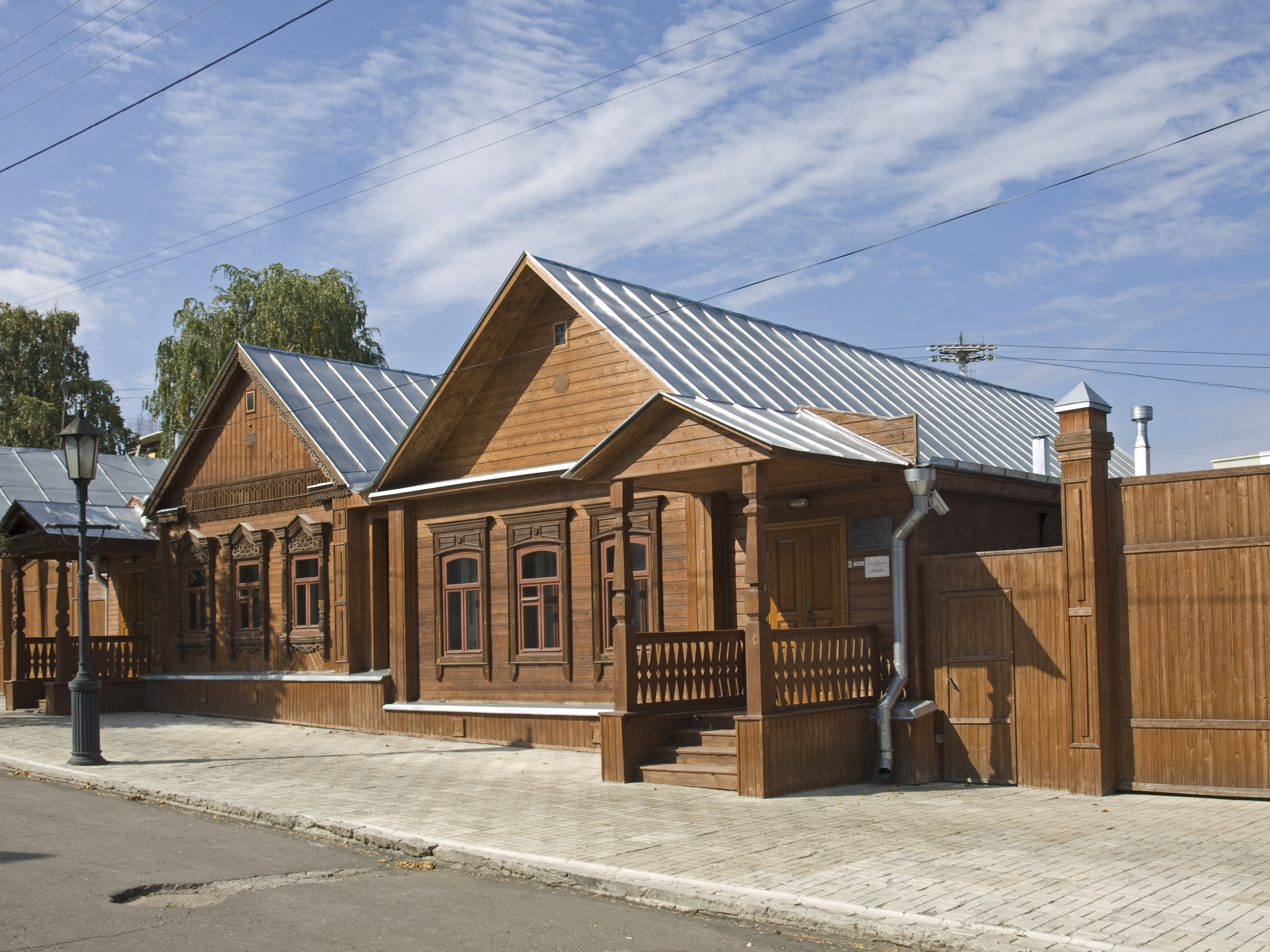
Klyuchevsky's house in Penza, currently the museum of Vasily Klyuchevsky

Vasily Osipovich Klyuchevsky (Russian: Василий Осипович Ключевский; 28 January [O.S. 16 January] 1841 – 25 May [O.S. 12 May] 1911) was a leading Russian Imperial historian of the late imperial period. He also addressed the contemporary Russian economy in his writings.

== Biography ==
A village priest's son, Klyuchevsky studied at Moscow University under Sergey Solovyov, to whose chair he succeeded in 1879. His first important publications were an article on economic activities of the Solovetsky Monastery (1867) and a thesis on medieval Russian hagiography (1871).

Klyuchevsky was one of the first Russian historians to shift attention away from political and social issues to geographical and economical forces. He was particularly interested in the process of Russian colonisation of Siberia and the Far East. In 1882, he published his landmark study of the Boyar Duma, whereby he asserted his view of a state as a result of collaboration of diverse classes of society.

In 1889, Klyuchevsky was elected to the Russian Academy of Sciences. Although his lectures were highly popular with the students of Moscow University, only a few of his works were intended for publication, e.g., a handful of biographies of "representative men", including Andrei Kurbsky, Afanasy Ordin-Nashchokin, Feodor Rtishchev, Vasily Galitzine, and Nikolay Novikov.

Klyuchevsky wrote his lectures on Russian history in the 1880s, and they were published in the 1900s and 1910s.

He formulated the traditional view of East Slavic history, defining it as one of the Russian state and "nationality", composed of two branches: the "Great Russian" (Russian) and "Little Russian" (Ukrainian). He believed that there had been a single Rus' nationality in Kievan times, that the Great Rus'ian branch formed between the mid-fifteenth and early seventeenth centuries, and then a gathering of parts of the "Russian nationality" under one "all-Russian authority" took place up to the mid-nineteenth century.

The last decade of his life was spent preparing the printed version of his lectures. He also became interested in politics, and joined the Constitutional Democratic Party. Maxim Gorky records the following dictum by Leo Tolstoy:

Karamzin wrote for the tsar, Solovyov wrote lengthily and tediously, and Klyuchevsky wrote for his own pleasure.

== Commemoration ==
- In the year of the 125th anniversary of V.O. Klyuchevsky's birth, in February 1966, one of Penza's streets, Popovka Street, where the future historian spent his childhood and youth (1851-1861), was renamed Klyuchevskogo Street;
- By Minor Planet Center of the Smithsonian Astrophysical Observatory (USA), a small planet No. 4560, discovered in 1991, was named after V.O. Klyuchevsky as it was the year of the 150th anniversary of his birth;
- On the occasion of the 150th birthday of the historian in 1991, in Penza, at Klyuchevskogo Street 66, the V.O. Klyuchevsky House Museum was opened. The museum is housed in two one-story wooden houses. It includes a memorial house in which V.O. Klyuchevsky lived from 1851 to 1861, and the house of his neighbors, the Shevirevs, which was in close proximity to the first. Both houses were connected by an internal passage, which allowed to create a single museum exposition. The museum exposition displays the life of the Klyuchevsky family during the years of their life in Penza;
- On the 150th anniversary of the birth of V. O. Klyuchevsky in 1991, in his native village of Voskresenovka, Penza District, Penza Oblast, a bust and a memorial plaque were opened on the territory of a rural school;
- Since 1994 the Presidium of the Russian Academy of Sciences awards established the Prize of V.O. Klyuchevsky for works in the field of Russian history;
- On October 11, 2008, a monument to V.O. Klyuchevsky was erected in Penza (by the sculptor V.Yu. Kuznetsov). The monument is a bronze statue mounted on a precast pedestal;
- On the 175th anniversary of V.O. Klyuchevsky, on December 16, 2016, the Legislative Assembly of Penza Oblast decided to assign the name of V.O. Klyuchevsky to Penza Secondary School No. 28;
- On November 14, 2018, in Penza, on the building of the former theological school, in which V.O. Klyuchevsky studied at the Penza Theological Seminary (the seminary was temporarily located in this building after the fire of 1858) and which is now turned into the Dentistry Department of Penza State University, there is a memorial plaque dedicated to him (by the sculptor V. Yu. Kuznetsov);
- On the 150th anniversary of his birth, in 1991 in the USSR postage stamp dedicated to Klyuchevsky was issued;
- On the occasion of the 170th birthday of V.O. Klyuchevsky in 2011, the Russian Post issued a postcard depicting the monument to V.O. Klyuchevsky by sculptor V. Yu. Kuznetsov in Penza and a postal envelope depicting Klyuchevsky’s house-museum in Penza, as well as a special postmark;
- On the occasion of the 175th anniversary of the birth of V.O. Klyuchevsky, in 2016 the Russian post issued a postage stamp and a postal envelope, as well as three special postmarks.

== English translations ==
- A History of Russia, (5 Volumes), J.M. Dent/E.P. Dutton, London/NY, 1911. from Archive.org
- Peter the Great, Beacon Press, Boston, 1984.
- Rise of the Romanovs, Barnes & Noble, 1993.
- Two samples of his prose can be found in Crimean-Nogai Raids#Historians on the Tatar Raids
