= Fyodor Rtishchev =

Russian noble (1625–1673)

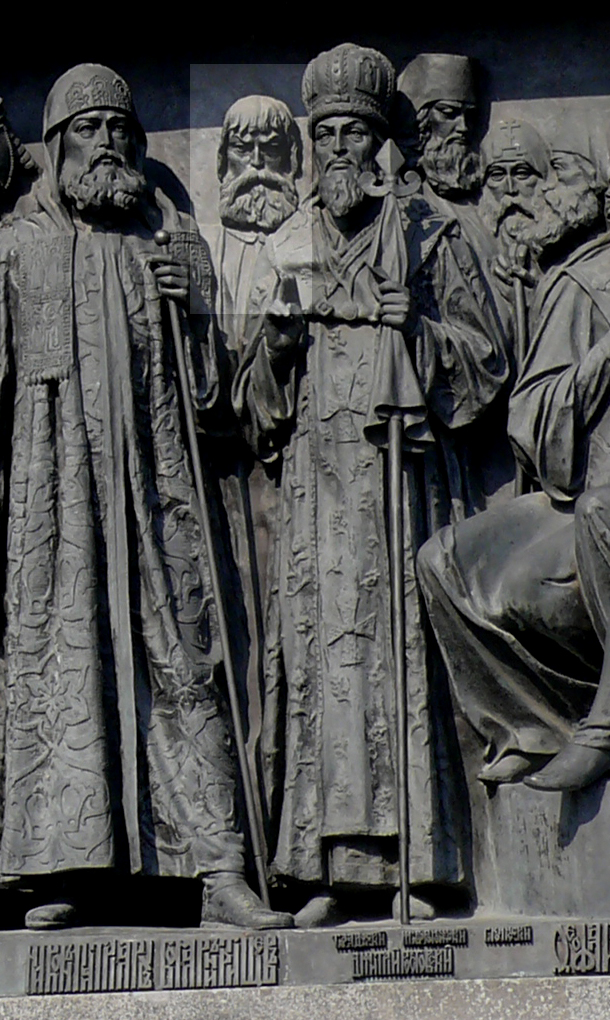
Boyar Rtishchev on the Millennium of Russia monument (in the background, between two clerics)

Feodor Mikhailovich Rtishchev (Russian: Фёдор Миха́йлович Рти́щев; April 16, 1625, Chekalinsky uyezd – July 1, 1673, Moscow) was a boyar and an intimate friend of Alexis I of Russia who was renowned for his piety and alms-deeds. He was the founder of the so-called Andreevsky School. It was the first educational institution in Russia, founded as a court circle during the reign of Alexei Mikhailovich.

As Rtischev eschewed publicity, the true extent of his influence on the Tsar's policies has been disputed by historians. It is thought that it was Rtischev who instigated the revision of service-books which led to the Great Schism of the Russian Orthodox Church. Some scholars also hold him responsible for the eventual downfall of Patriarch Nikon.

During the great famine in Vologda (1650), Rtischev sold much of his property, including clothes and house utensils, in order to raise funds for the famine-stricken city. He took care for all the wounded in the Russo-Polish wars, notwithstanding their nationality, and established several alms-houses in Moscow.

Remembered as the earliest patron of Russian education, Rtischev founded one of the first schools in Moscow, where he invited Epiphanius Slavinetsky to instruct the students in Greek language. Rtischev's school is considered as an institution that preceded the establishment of the Slavic Greek Latin Academy in Moscow and, thus, gave impetus to the emergence of higher education in Russia

It is known that Rtischev survived several assassination attempts, and wrote a treatise on falconry. His biography was written by Vasily Klyuchevsky.

Fyodor was a relative of Ustinia Bogdanovna Rtishcheva and her daughter Eudoxia Lopukhina. Eudoxia was chosen by Natalia Naryshkina as the first Tsarina for her son Peter I of Russia due to her relation to Fyodor.
