= Monastery of the Holy Mandylion, Moscow =

Orthodox monastery in Moscow

Coordinates: 55°45′23″N 37°37′14″E

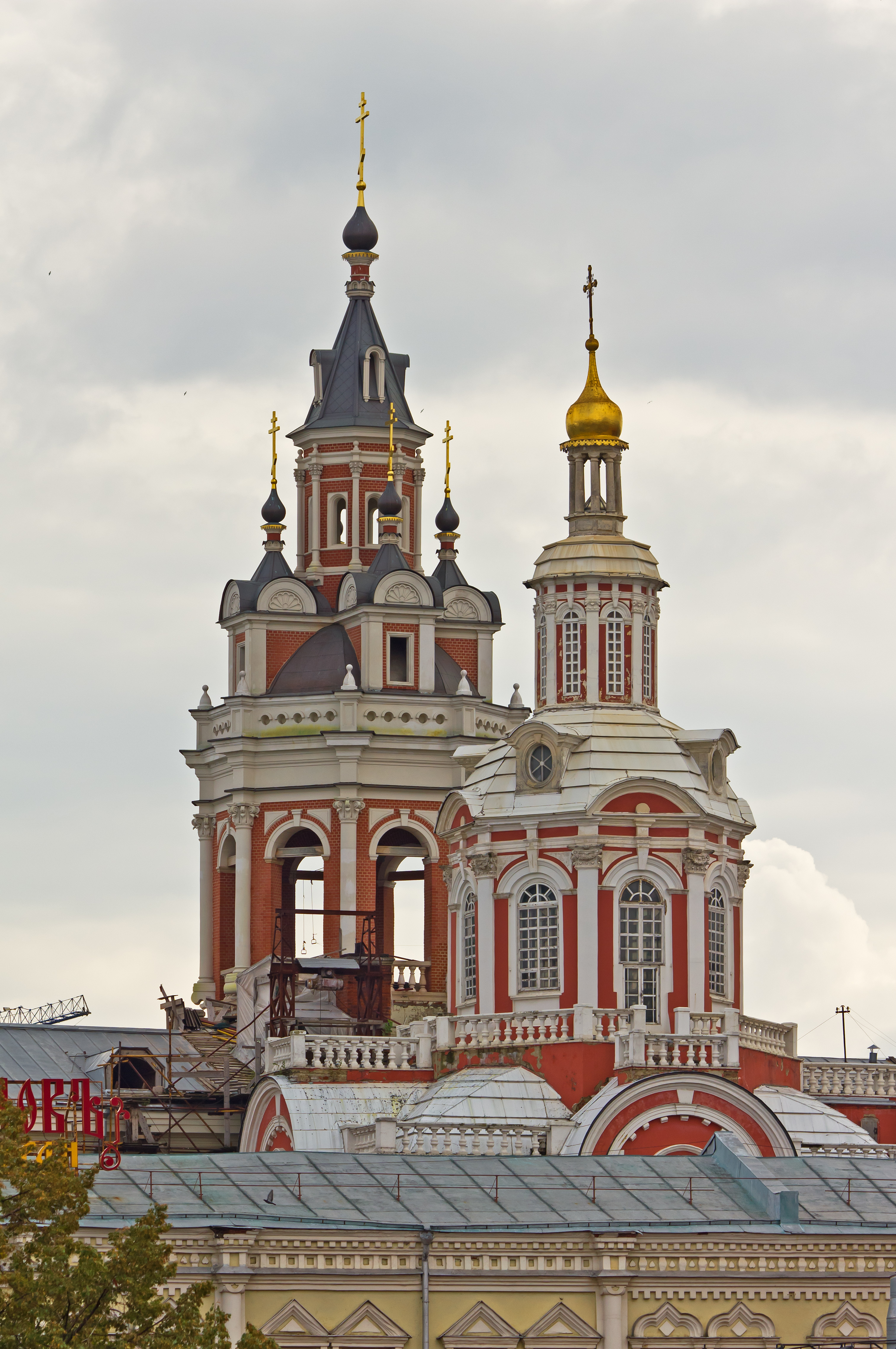
The katholikon is dedicated to the Holy Mandylion.

The Monastery of the Holy Mandylion or Zaikonospassky Monastery (Russian: Заиконоспасский монастырь, romanized: Zaikonospasskiy monastyr') is an Orthodox monastery on the Nikolskaya Street in Kitai-gorod, Moscow, just one block away from the Kremlin.

It was founded in 1600 by Boris Godunov. At first called "Saviour the Old", the monastery gradually acquired its present quaint name which alludes to its location and means "the Saviour behind the icon shops".

In the late 17th century, the monastery's learned administrators such as Symeon of Polotsk and Sylvester Medvedev had it transformed into a hotbed of enlightenment. Between 1687 and 1814, it was home to the Slavic Greek Latin Academy, Russia's first secondary education establishment. There is a memorial plaque in honor of its most famous student, Mikhail Lomonosov. After Lomonosov founded the Moscow University in 1755, the academy declined in importance.

The surviving buildings include the Baroque katholikon of the Holy Mandylion (originally constructed in 1660-1661; rebuilt in 1717–1720 and 1742), several 17th-century chambers as well as a former school building which dates to 1822. After the October Revolution, the monastery's distinctive belltower was pulled down and the remaining buildings were given to the Moscow State Institute for History and Archives.

The Russian Orthodox Church had the Zaikonospassky Monastery reopened in 1992. It has been involved in litigation with the institute's successor over ownership of these assets. In 2014, the belltower was rebuilt to the same design.

== Burials ==
- Karion Istomin
- Symeon of Polotsk
