= Slavyanskaya Square =

Public square in Russia

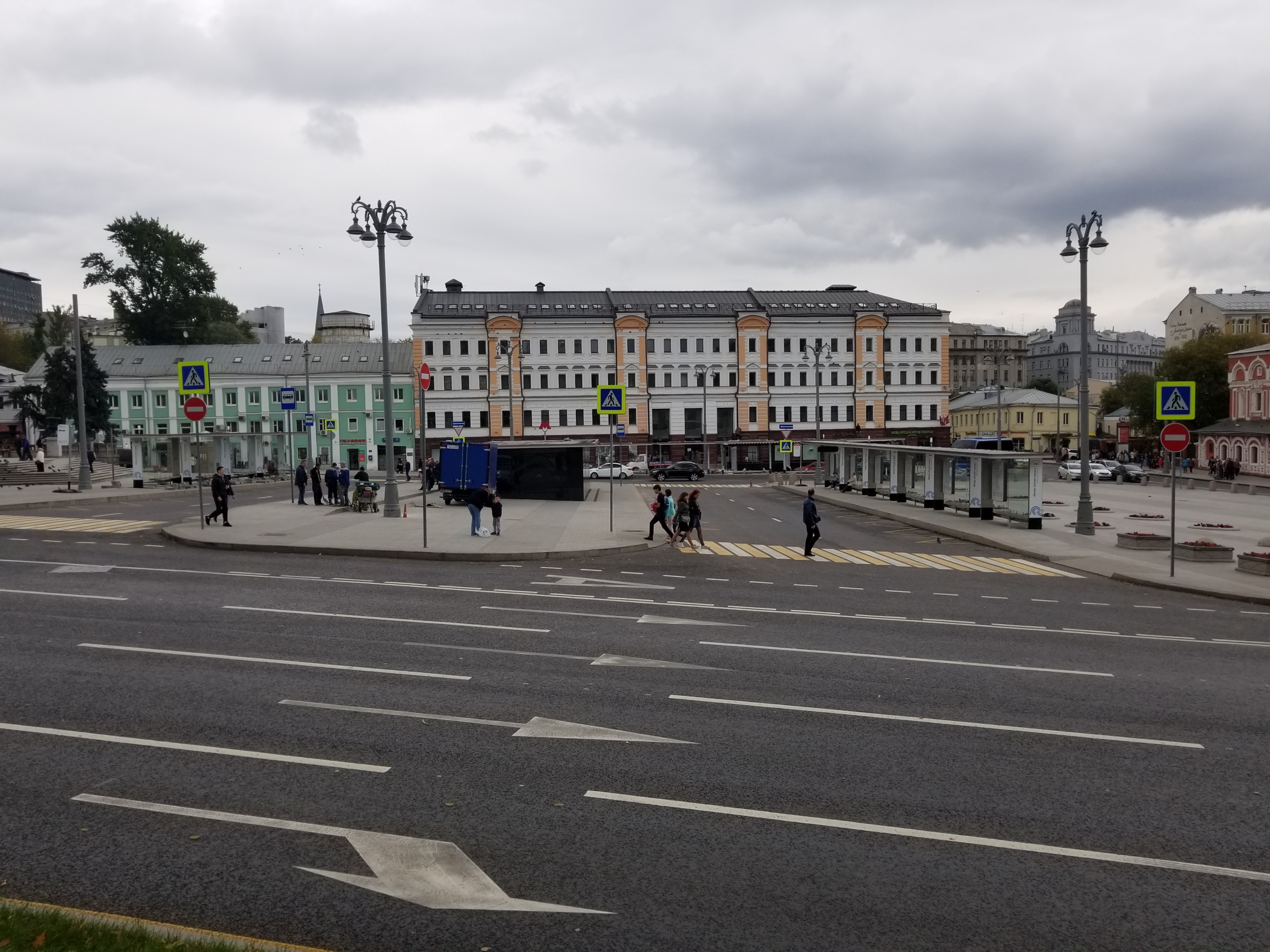
- Slavyanskaya Square after reconstruction in 2017
- Interactive map of Slavyanskaya Square
- Native name: Славянская площадь (Russian)
- Location: Moscow; Central Administrative Okrug; Tagansky District
- Nearest metro station: Kitay-gorod
- Coordinates: 55.75389°N 37.63304°E

Slavyanskaya Square (Russian: Славянская площадь) is a square in central Moscow, renamed in 1924–1990 as the northern side of Nogina Square (Площадь Ногина); the southern side of Soviet-era Nogina Square reverted to its old name Varvarka Gates Square (Площадь Варварских Ворот). These two squares separate the central Kitai-gorod from the eastward Tagansky District. They connect to Varvarka Street (west), Solyanka Street (east), Kitaigorodsky Lane (south), Staraya Square and Lubyansky Lane (north), completing the half-circle of Central Squares of Moscow around Moscow Kremlin and Kitay-gorod.

== Disambiguation ==
Slavyanskaya Square and southbound Varvarka Gates Square form a contiguous city square, but are officially different locations, a fact that may confuse even Muscovites. To add to this confusion, Staraya Square is not a square per se but a city street (closed to regular traffic) that discharges into Varvarka Gates Square. In the past, Staraya (Old) and Novaya (New) Squares frequently interchanged their names, too.

Buildings with street numbers assigned to Slavyanskaya Square are: Church of All Saints on the southern side of the square and the 1900s office block behind it; all other buildings in the square are assigned to Lubyansky Lane and Varvarka Gates Square.

== History ==
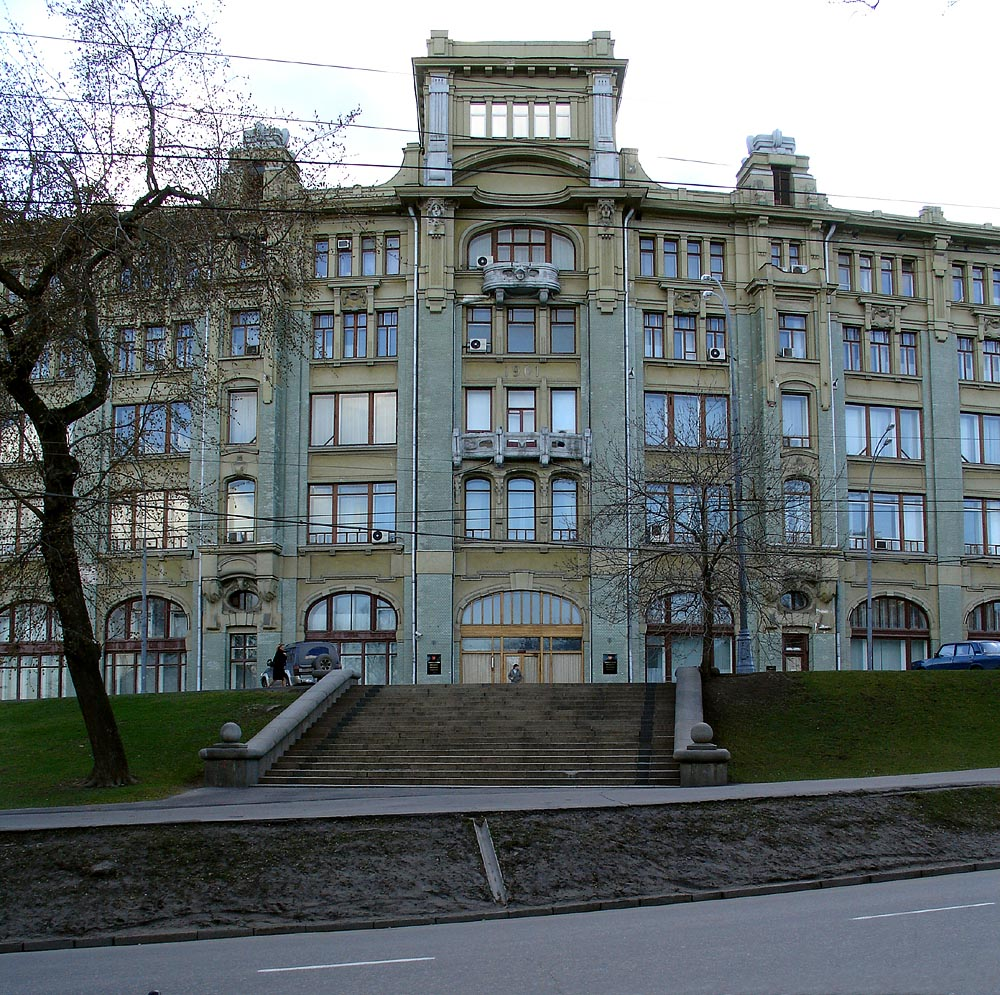
Boyarsky Dvor offices by Fyodor Schechtel

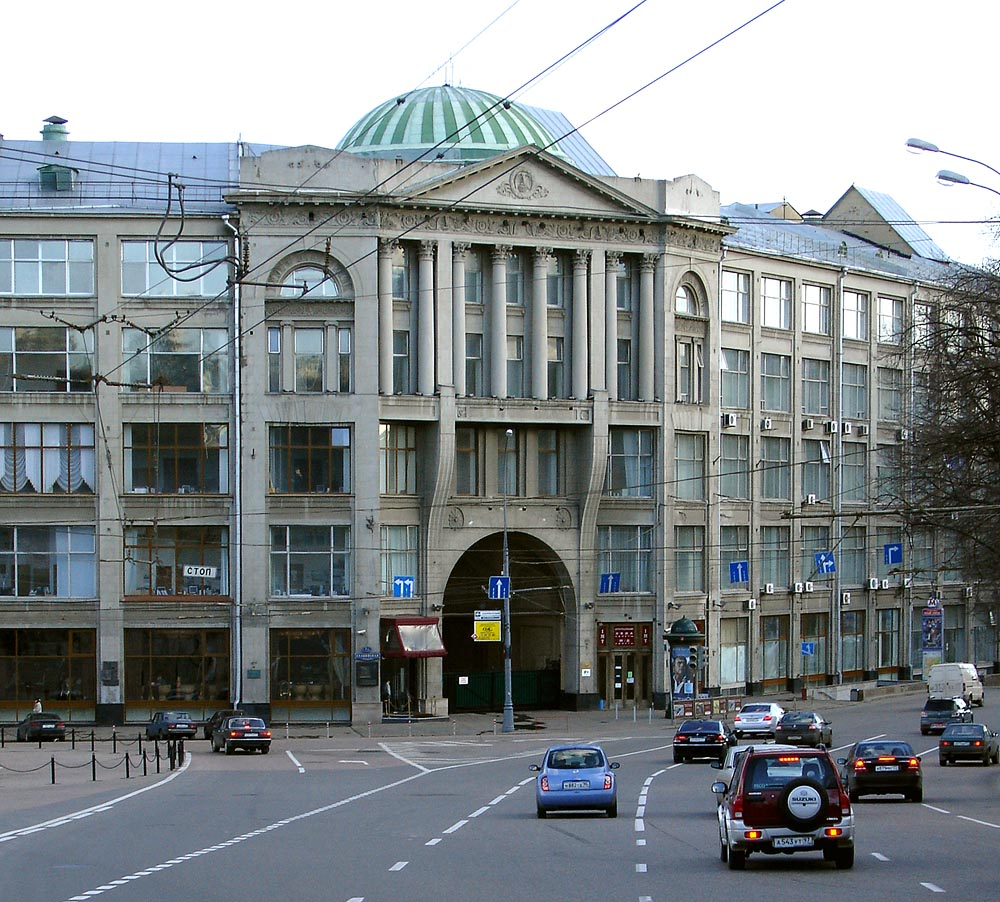
Delovoy Dvor used to face the demolished fortress wall and tower.

The area was urbanized in the 15th century; the Kitai-gorod wall was erected in the 1530s, on the raised hill. The existing Church of All Saints was built in the 1480s and subsequently rebuilt in the 17th century.

Until 1934, territories inside the wall developed separately from the rest of the city, retaining medieval congestion until the 1890s despite numerous plans to redevelop Kitai-gorod. In the 1890s, Moscow Merchant Society consolidated the blocks within the wall, and built a string of majestic office buildings, notably Boyarsky Dvor facing Varvarka Gates and Staraya Square (by Fyodor Schechtel), 4 Staraya Square, former Communist Party Headquarters (by Vladimir Sherwood Jr.), and Delovoy Dvor (by Ivan Kuznetsov). The square and Solyanka Street acquired the finest examples of late Art Nouveau and Russian neoclassical revival; however, developers failed to obtain the permits for demolition of the wall.

The boulevard north from the square was formed in two stages; first, the old Apple Market near Novaya Square was replaced with a boulevard across Polytechnical Museum (1880s, with the 1887 Plevna Monument). Next, the southern part of the boulevard was cleaned up with the demolition of Varvarka Gated market.

The two squares acquired their present shape in 1934, when the State demolished the Kitai-gorod tower blocking the exit from Varvarka Street and the fortress wall between Staraya Square and Kitaisky Lane. Remains of the tower are visible in an underground vestibule of Kitay-Gorod subway station.

Monument to Saints Cyril and Methodius by Vyacheslav Klykov was opened on the northbound boulevard in 1992. The Square is a common starting point for public rallies, in particular.

== Public transportation access ==
- Southern vestibule of the Kitay-gorod station of the Moscow Metro is located right under the square.
- Kitay-gorod bus terminal.
