= Vladimir Sherwood =

Vladimir Sherwood (or Shervud) may refer to:

- Vladimir Osipovich Sherwood (1832 - 1897), Russian architect
- Vladimir Vladimirovich Sherwood (1867 - 1930), Russian architect, son of Vladimir Osipovich Sherwood
