= House of Lobkov on the Sophia Embankment =

- Дом Лобкова на Софийской набережной (Russian)
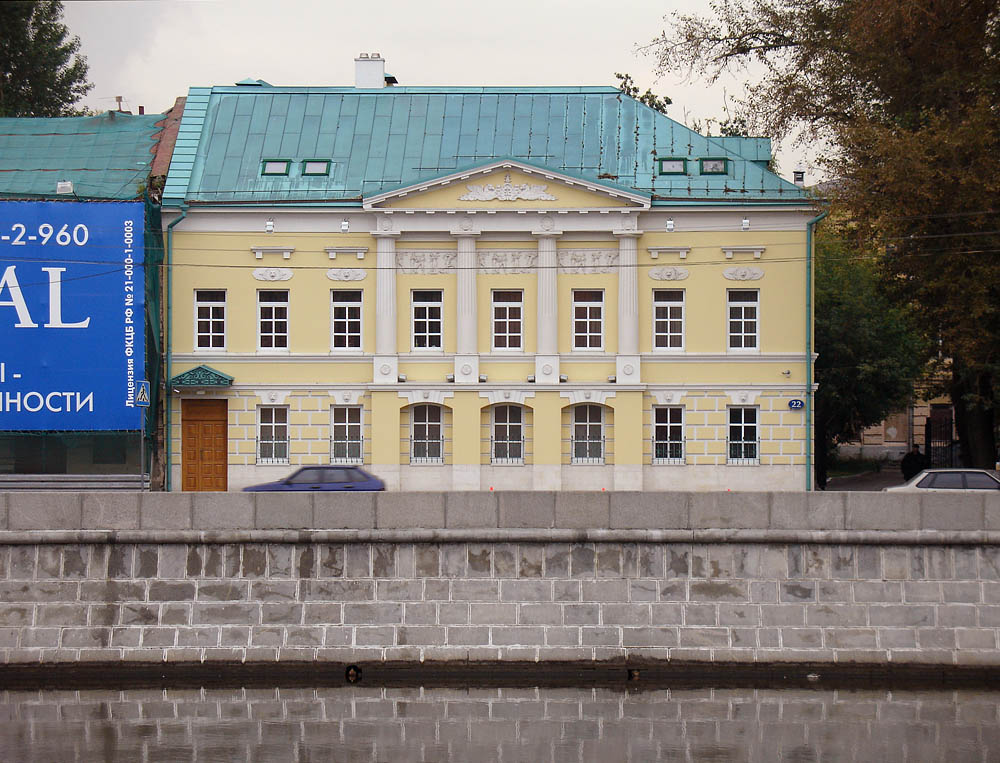
- Interactive map of the House of Lobkov on the Sophia Embankment area

General information
- Location: Moscow, Sofiyskaya naberezhnaya, house 22
- Coordinates: 55°44′52″N 37°37′06″E
- Completed: 1816

The House of Lobkov on the Sophia Embankment (Russian: Дом Лобкова на Софийской набережной) is a mansion in the center of Moscow (Sofia embankment, house 22). Built around 1816 in the Empire style. It was rebuilt in 2003 with a superstructure of the attic floor. The Lobkov House has the status of an object of cultural heritage of federal significance.

== History ==
The house of the merchant Ivan Lobkov was built around 1816 in the Empire style on the basis of an older building, presumably burnt during the fire of 1812. According to the information of 1826, the house belonged to merchant Nakhodkina. In 1849–1918, the merchants of Verevkina owned the mansion.

In the middle of the 19th century, from the side of the courtyard to the house a two-storeyed gallery with a rounded corner was attached. After the reconstruction in 1914, the facade was decorated with decorative elements in the Neoclassicism style.

At the end of the 19th to the beginning of the 20th century, the editorial office of the newspaper Nedelya was located on the first floor. After the October Revolution, the building was nationalized and there were communal apartments, and later - various institutions. In the 1970s, reconstruction was carried out, during which interiors were changed into the walls, and a metal frame was built into the walls.

By the beginning of the 21st century the house is in a long lease from the firm "Eladi" and was in emergency condition. In 2002–2003, it was rebuilt according to the method of "preservation of the front wall": the ceilings and the rear wall were demolished, the attic floor was added.

== Architecture ==
The two-story mansion refers to the Empire style, but it has several heavy proportions. In its design decorative elements are used, typical for post-fire buildings: wreaths, cartouches, lion masks, relief panels. The central part of the facade is marked with pilasters of the Doric order with a pediment.
