= Vladimir Vladimirovich Sherwood =

Russian architect (1867–1930)

- Владимир Владимирович Шервуд
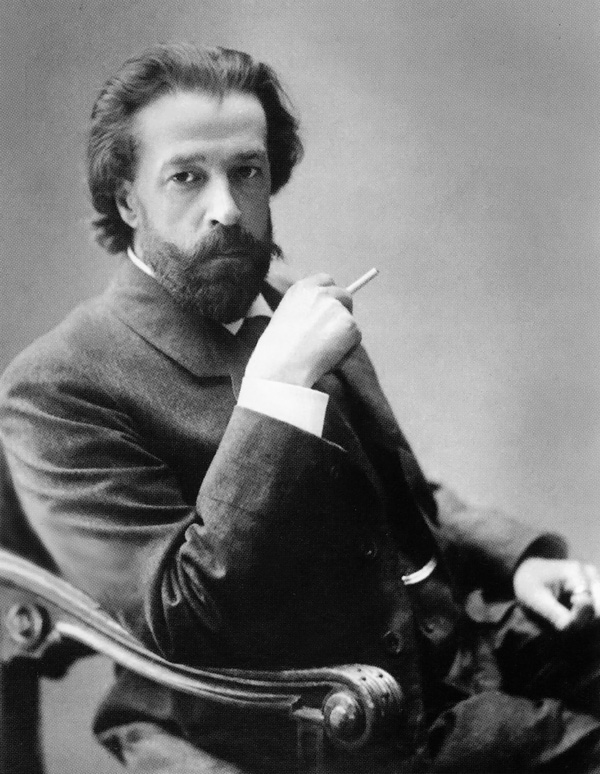
- V. V. Sherwood, c. 1900s
- Born: May 17, 1867; Moscow, Russian Empire
- Died: June 18, 1930 (aged 63); Moscow, Soviet Union
- Occupation: Architect
- Practice: Moscow Merchant Society; Own practice
- Buildings: Titov building 12–14 Novokuznetskaya Street; 7-7 Malaya Polyanka Street (all in Moscow)

Vladimir Vladimirovich Sherwood or Shervud (Russian: Влади́мир Влади́мирович Ше́рвуд; May 17, 1867 — June 18, 1930) was a Russian architect who worked in Moscow in 1895–1914 in Art Nouveau style and modernized classics variant of Russian neoclassical revival that predated modernist architecture of the 1920s.

== Biography ==
Vladimir Sherwood, junior, was the son of Vladimir Osipovich Sherwood (Владимир Осипович Шервуд, 1832 — 1897), architect of the State Historical Museum in Red Square. His brother Sergei Vladimirovich Sherwood (1858–1899) also became an architect but died prematurely; another brother, Leonid Vladimirovich Sherwood (1871–1954) became a sculptor based in Saint Petersburg.

Vladimir Sherwood graduated from the Moscow School of Painting, Sculpture and Architecture in 1895, and was employed first as the house architect of Bromley Brothers Steel Works (1898–1903) (It is a common misconception that the Bromley Steels Works refers to Bromley the place but it is in fact Bromley Bros., British steel makers who operated in Imperial Russia and provided the boilers for the 1896 Nizhni-Novgorod Fair – pg44 The Engineer July 10, 1896) and by the Moscow Merchant Society — a business consortium responsible for redevelopment of Kitai-Gorod and Central Squares of Moscow (1903–1910). Sherwood is credited with work on the new master plan for Kitai-gorod, partially executed before World War I, although exact extent of his input has not been reliably studied.

His first independent work was a Gothic Revival Reck Mansion on the Garden Ring (destroyed). It was followed by an extant apartment block in Smolenskaya Square which remained Sherwood's only pure example of Art Nouveau. As he gained experience, popularity of this style faded and Sherwood's later works gradually moved from simplified Art Nouveau to modernized classics. His career peaked in the five years preceding the outbreak of World War I. Sherwood became notable as the author of numerous rental apartment and office buildings; three of his projects are listed on the protected buildings register: 12–14 Novokuznetskaya Street, 7-7 Malaya Polyanka Street (Ivan Shmelyov home), and a large neoclassical block at 1, Solyanka Street.

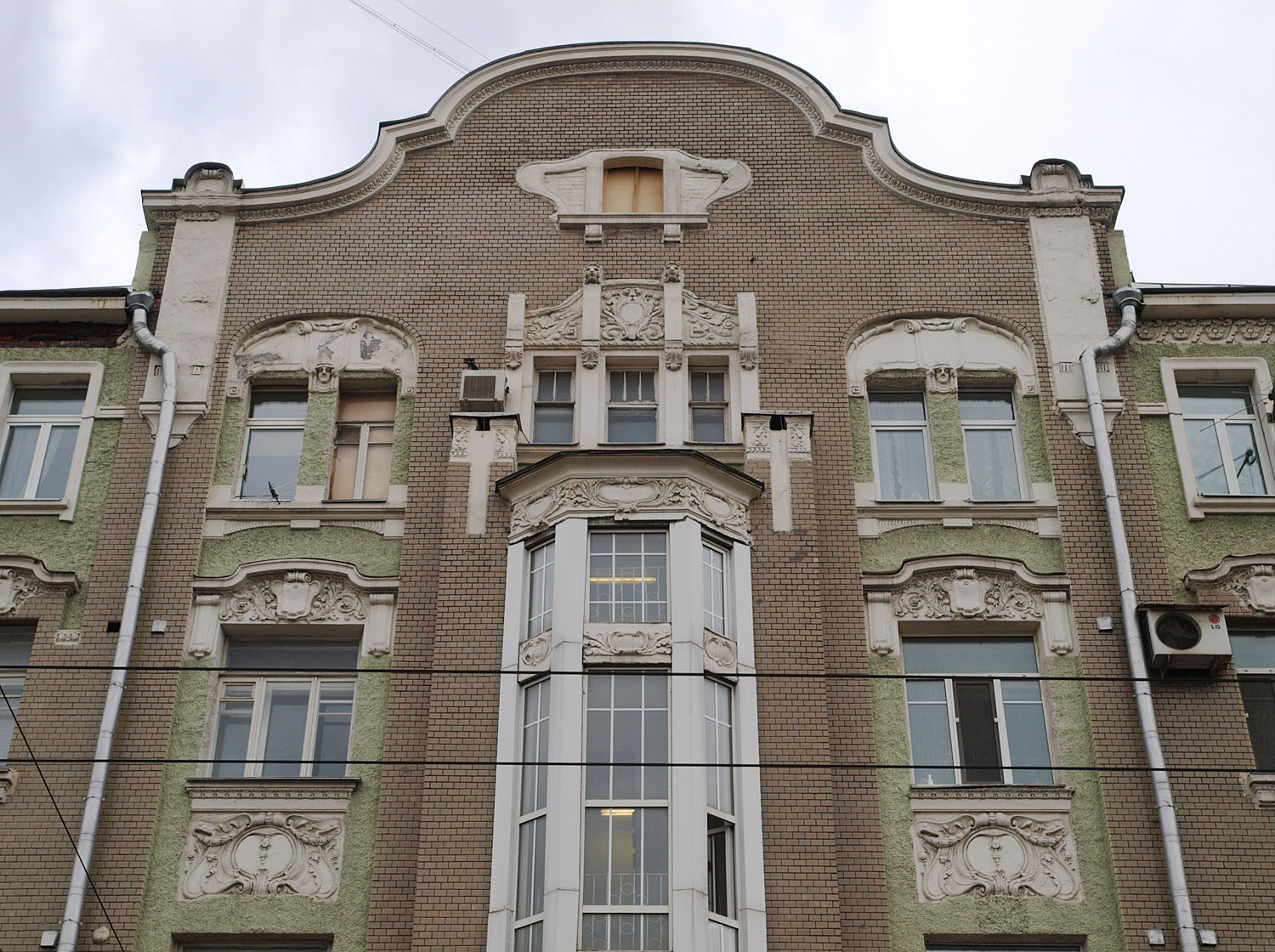
44, Pokrovka Street

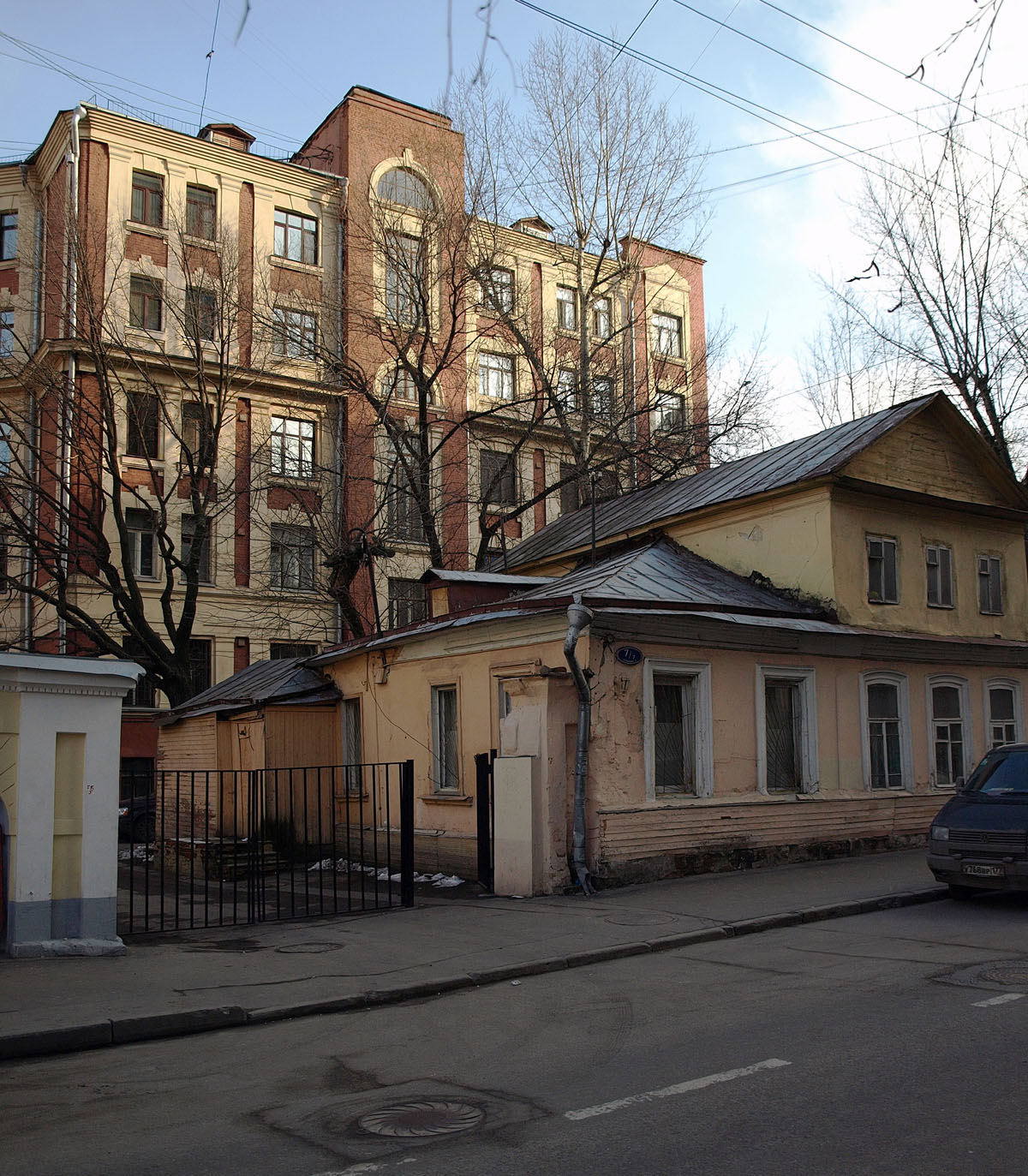
7-7, Malaya Polyanka Street

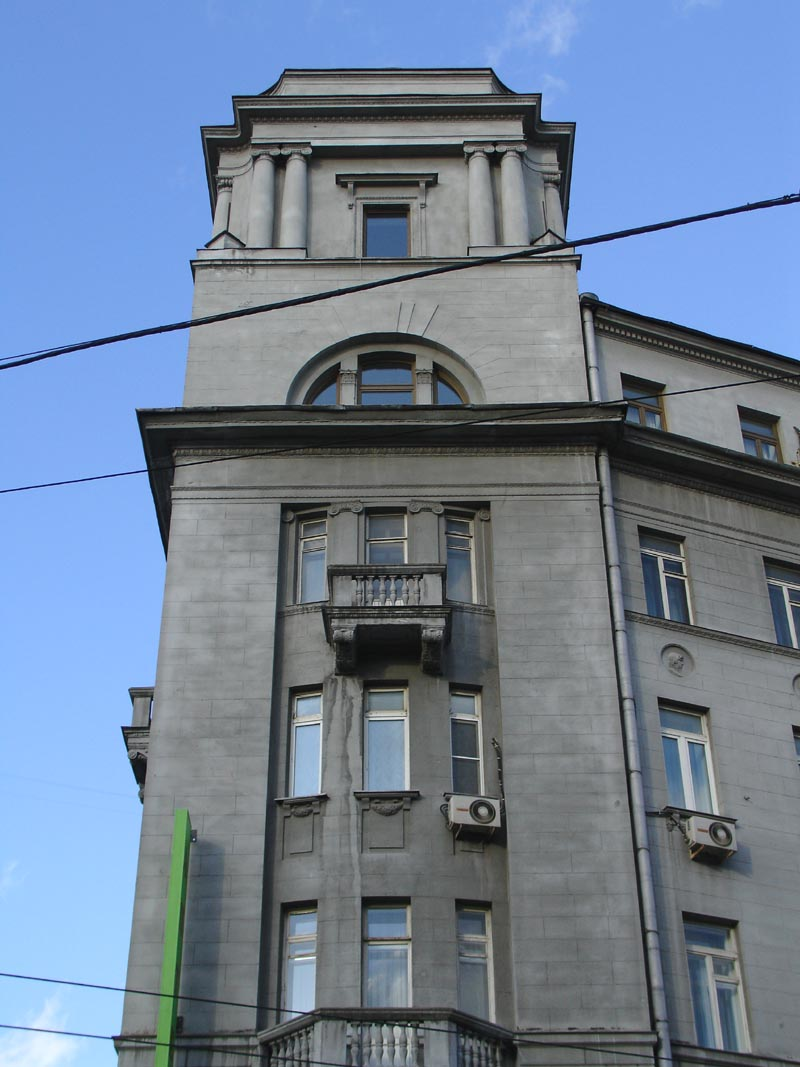
1, Solyanka Street

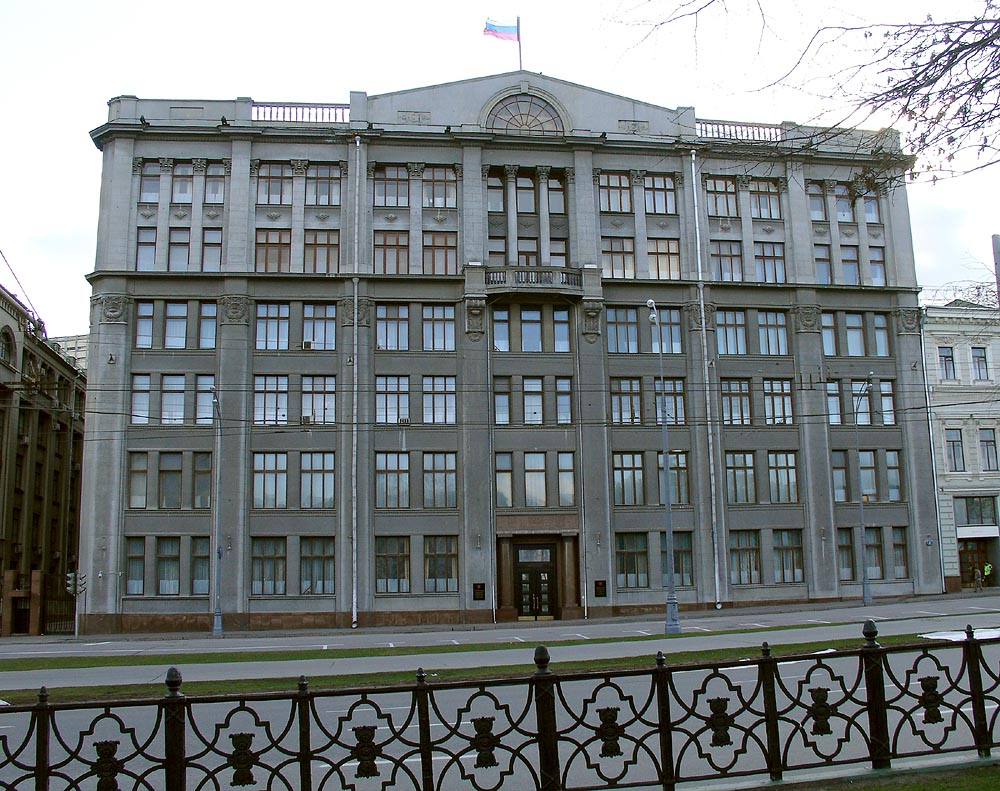
Former Titov Building (1912-1915)

Sherwood's best known work, Titov Building, at Staraya Square 4, was a radical departure from his Art Nouveau practice. Stylistically it was in line with Russian neoclassical revival, however, the design emphasized the steel frame structure and was marked by unusually large glass surfaces providing adequate insolation to deep office floors of this mixed-use building. Sherwood refused to use classical order altogether, creating "classical atmosphere" with carefully measures indents of stone-clad pilasters and cornices, and a modest, purely decorative pediment. Contemporaries marked this style as modernized classics (Russian: модернизированная классика); it was reused by Stalinist architecture to the point where Titov Building is frequently mistaken for a mid-20th century government edifice.

In 1920s—1991 former Titov Building housed the Central Committee of the Communist Party of the Soviet Union headquarters and became the symbol of party apparatus. It is currently occupied by the Presidential Administration of Russia. Titov Building, completed in 1915, remained the last recorded work by Sherwood; he lived the remaining 15 years of his life in Moscow but was not involved in construction projects anymore.

== See also ==
Architects involved in Kitai-Gorod redevelopment by Moscow Merchant Society, 1890s–1917:

- Alexander Kaminsky
- Roman Klein
- Ivan Kuznetsov
- Fyodor Schechtel
