= Staraya Square =

Historic square in central Moscow

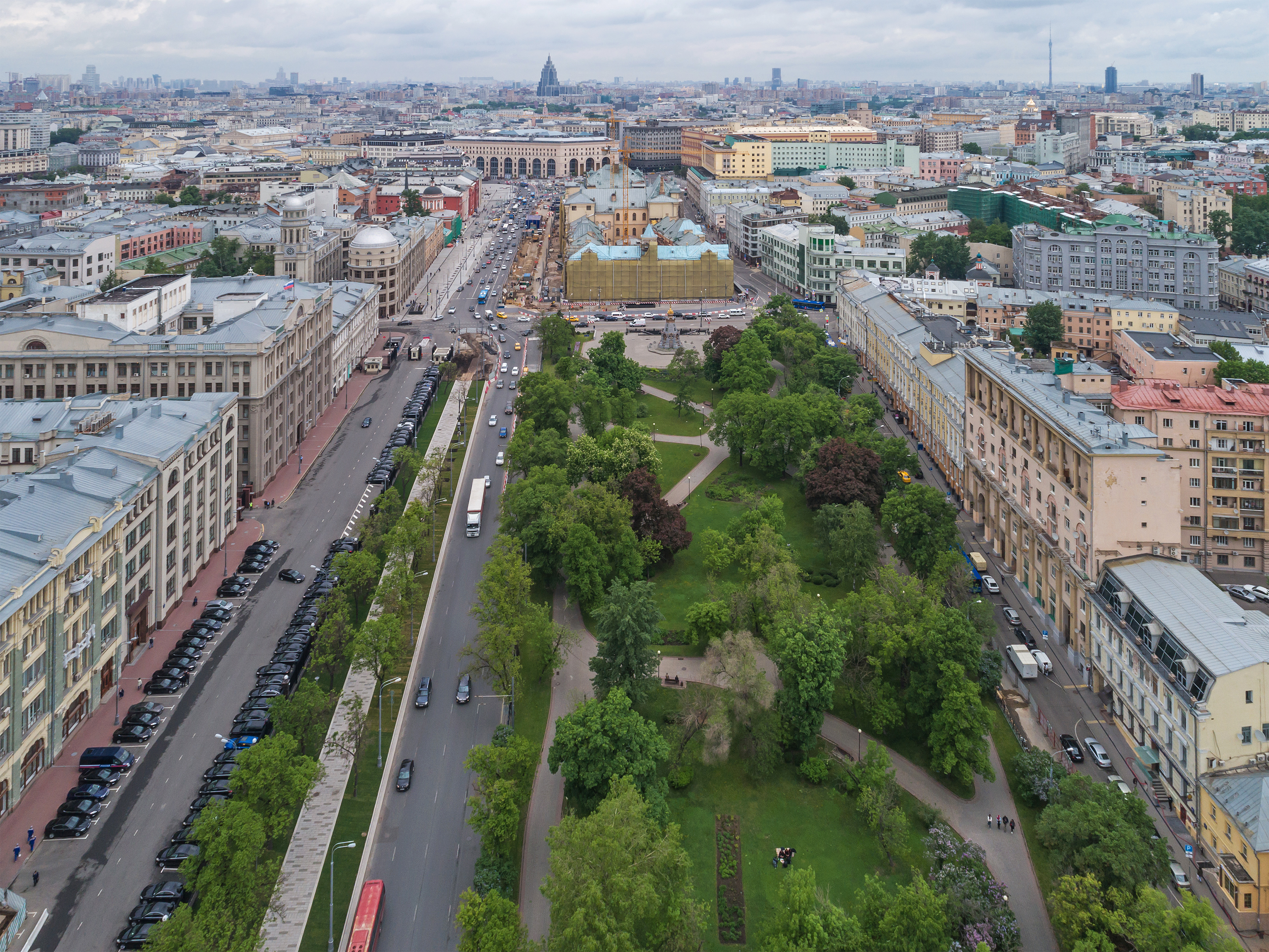
- Aerial view
- Native name: Старая площадь (Russian)
- Location: Moscow; Central Administrative Okrug; Tverskoy District
- Nearest metro station: Kitay-gorod
- Coordinates: 55.7555555656°N 37.6305555656°E

Staraya Square (/ˈstɑːraɪə/ STAR-eye-ə; Russian: Старая площадь [ˈstarəjə ˈpɫoɕːɪtʲ]; lit. 'Old Square') connects Ilyinka Street with Varvarka Gates Square in central Kitai-gorod area of Moscow, Russia. It is not a square in a true sense, but a street, normally closed to regular city traffic. The historical building located at 4 Staraya Square, was the headquarters of the Central Committee of the Communist Party of the Soviet Union, thus Staraya Square became a symbol for the Party apparatus. Now the building is the headquarters of Presidential Administration of Russia, retaining its symbolic value. It is one of the Central Squares of Moscow forming an arc around Moscow Kremlin and Kitai-gorod.

== History ==
Staraya Square emerged as the city street inside the Kitai-gorod fortress wall; a parallel street outside the wall is named Kitaisky Lane (as there are no buildings in this lane, the name has fallen out of usage). The wall was built in 1530s, and demolished in 1934.

Throughout the 19th century, Staraya Square and northbound Novaya Square frequently interchanged their names, confusing Muscovites and visitors; modern usage settled down in early 20th century. In 1899, the city closed down the flea markets around the fortress wall. Before the outbreak of World War I, the Moscow Merchant Society had rebuilt Staraya Square with a chain of grand office buildings such as an Art Nouveau example, Boyarsky Dvor (by Fyodor Schechtel), and neoclassical 4, Staraya Square (by Vladimir Sherwood Jr.). Since 1918, they have been occupied by Soviet and presently Russian federal institutions.

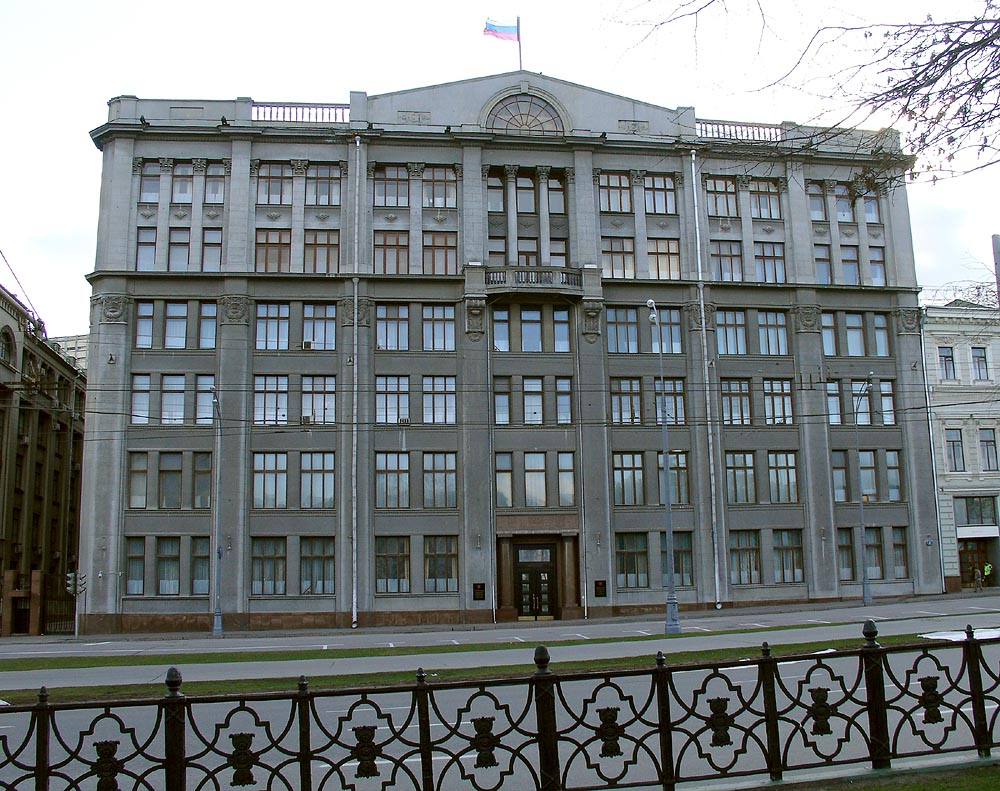
4, Staraya Square, Presidential Administration of Russia (former Central Committee), built in 1912–1914.

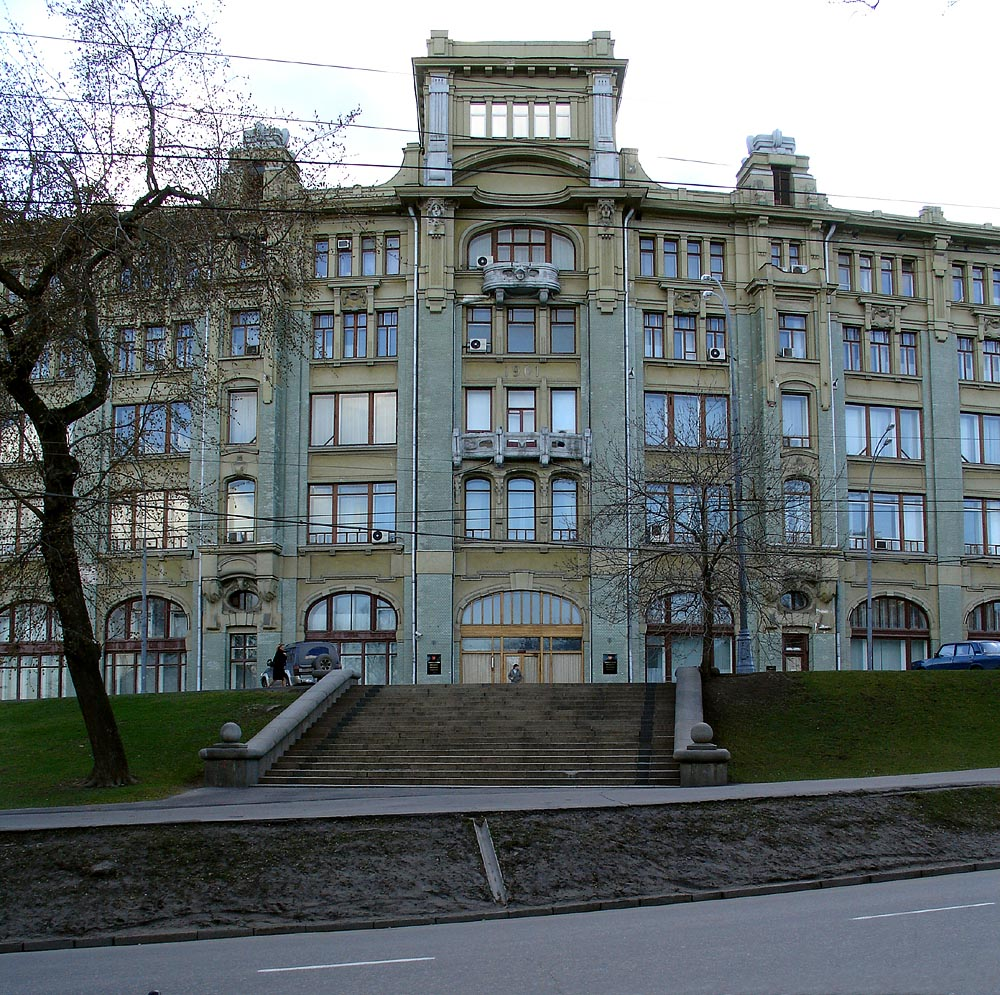
8, Staraya Square (Boyarsky Dvor). The street in foreground in Kitaysky Lane; Staraya Square runs on the upper level. Kitai-gorod wall ran roughly at the top of the stairs.

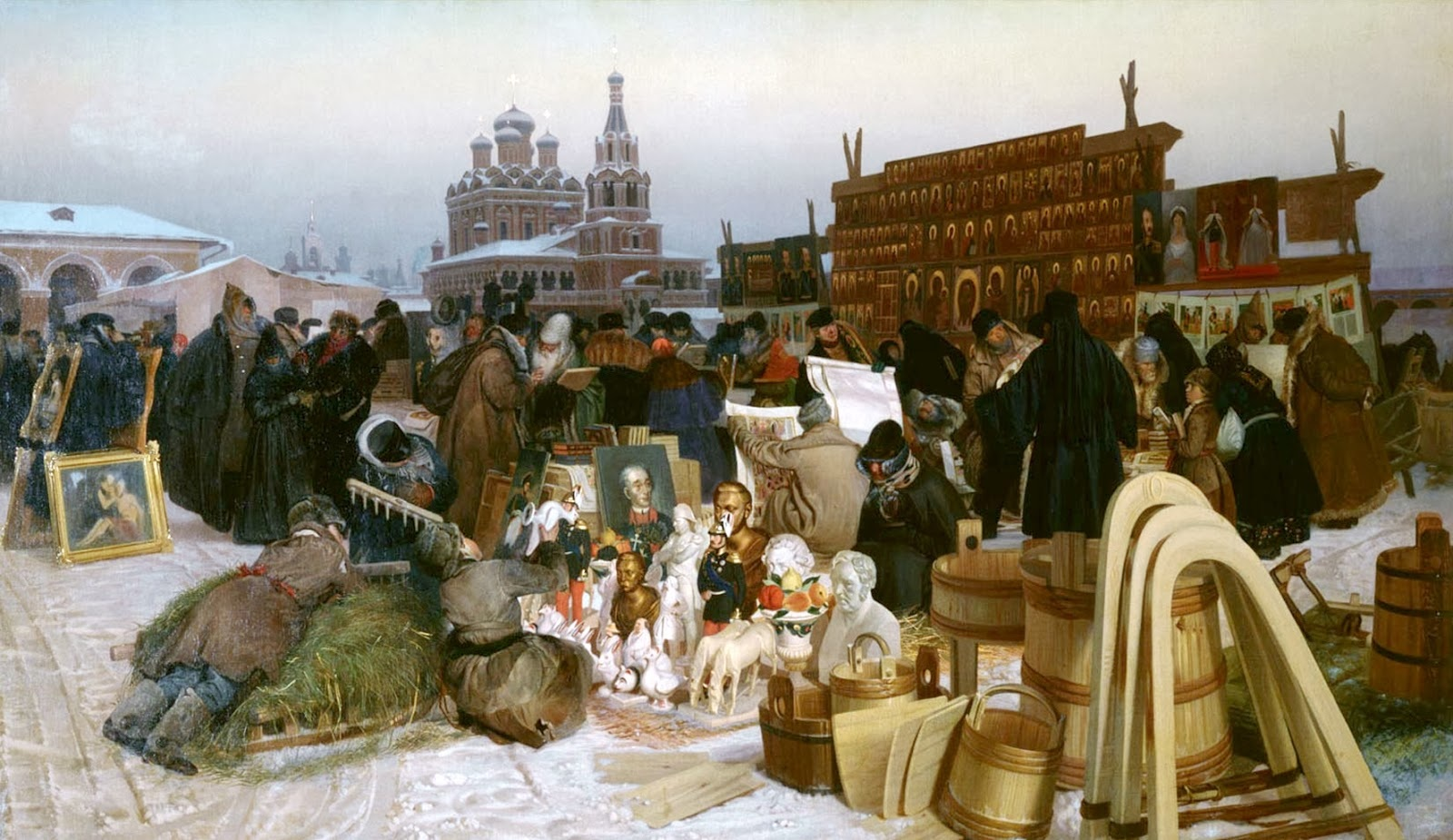
Market in the Staraya Square. By Е.Sorokin, 1852

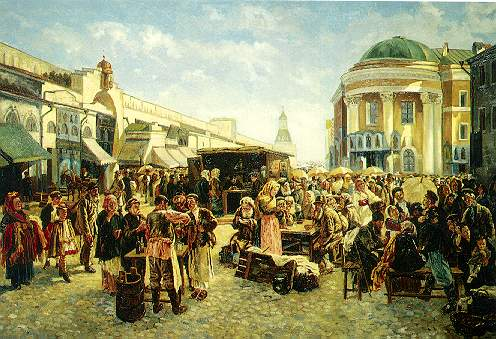
Staraya Square. Flea market. By V.Pozdneev, 1890

== Public transportation access ==
- Moscow Metro: Kitai-gorod
