= Kremlin Ring =

Ring road in Moscow, Russia

The Kremlin Ring (Russian: Кремлёвское кольцо; transliteration: Kremlovskoye Koltso), also called the Central Squares of Moscow, consists of a chain of squares around the historical Moscow Kremlin and Kitai-gorod areas of central Moscow, Russia, following the historical and now mostly razed Kitai-gorod wall. These squares and avenues connecting them form the innermost ring road in Moscow open to regular traffic. The names of central squares changed frequently for political reasons and as a result of urban redevelopment; some of these squares are actually city streets (Staraya Square, Novaya Square); other locations are shaped like squares, but have no names of their own.

== Term ==
Since 1992, the name “Kremlin Ring” has been given to the first route of the Five Rings of Moscow cycling race. In the official documents of the Government of Moscow, this term, as a designation of a highway, began to appear no later than the first half of the 2000s. The publicist Aleksander Toroptsev wrote in 2007: "... not a single map of Moscow, not a single textbook on Moscow studies has such a historical and geographical term - the Kremlin Ring, although the ring itself exists, and it has a history, and geography, and cultural values, and architectural masterpieces, and, moreover, there is a certain, if I may say so, urban unity of the Kremlin Ring". The term began to be actively used in the second half of the 2010s, during the implementation of the My Street program. The term also appeared on the official scheme of night bus routes in Moscow.

In the 1997 book "Moscow: An Architectural Guide" instead of the term "Kremlin Ring", the name "Semiring of Central Squares" is used.

== List ==
This is a list of the Central Squares and their connecting avenues, clockwise from Bolshoy Kamenny Bridge:

- Borovitskaya Square
  - Manege Street (inner ring, closed to traffic) and Mokhovaya Street (outer ring)
- Manezhnaya Square, Moscow
  - Okhotny Ryad Street
- Revolution Square, Moscow (inner ring) and Theatre Square (outer ring)
  - Teatralny Lane
- Lubyanka Square
  - Novaya Square (inner ring) and Lubyansky Lane (outer ring)
- Ilyinka Gates Square
  - Staraya Square (inner ring, closed to traffic), Kitaisky Lane (inner ring) and Lubyansky Lane (outer ring)
- Slavyanskaya Square
- Varvarka Gates Square
  - Kitaigorodsky Lane
