= Russian Neoclassical Revival =

Early 20th-century cultural movement

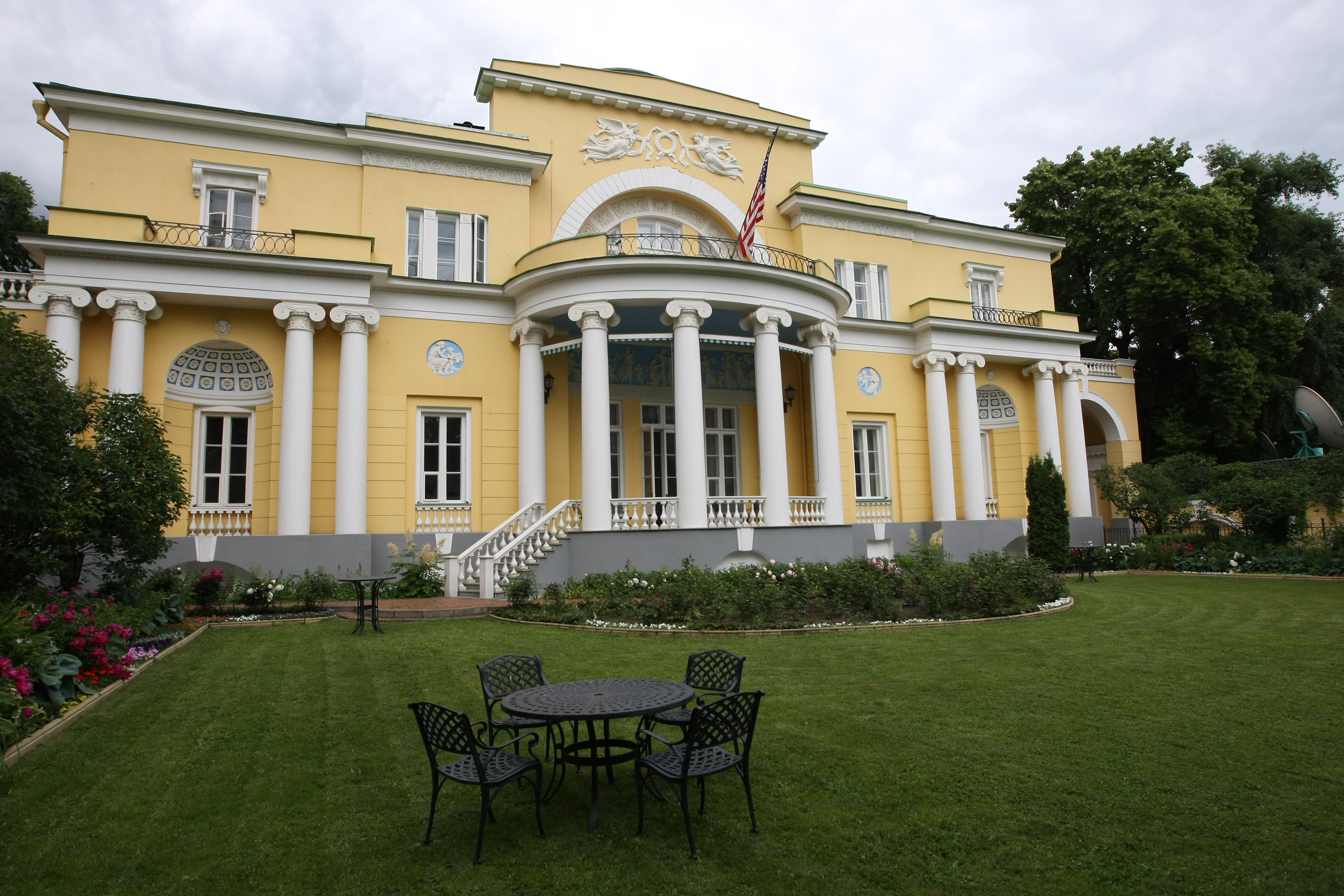
Nikolay Vtorov mansion in Moscow, also known as Spaso House, 1913–1915. Architects Vladimir Adamovich and Vladimir Mayat recreated the air of an Empire style country estate in a downtown residence.

Russian Neoclassical Revival was a trend in Russian culture, most pronounced in architecture, that briefly replaced Eclecticism and Art Nouveau as the leading architectural style between the Revolution of 1905 and the outbreak of World War I, coexisting with the Silver Age of Russian Poetry. It is characterized by a merger of new technologies (steel frame and reinforced concrete) with a moderate application of classical orders and the legacy of the Russian Empire style of the first quarter of the 19th century.

The Neoclassical Revival school was most active in Saint Petersburg, and less active in Moscow and other cities. The style was a common choice for luxurious country estates, as well as upper-class apartment blocks and office buildings. However, it was practically non-existent in church and government architecture. Neoclassical architects born in the 1870s, who reached their peak activity in 1905–1914 (Ivan Fomin, Vladimir Shchuko, Ivan Zholtovsky), later became leading figures in the Stalinist architecture of the 1930s and shaped the Soviet architectural education system.

== Origin of the style ==
=== Background ===
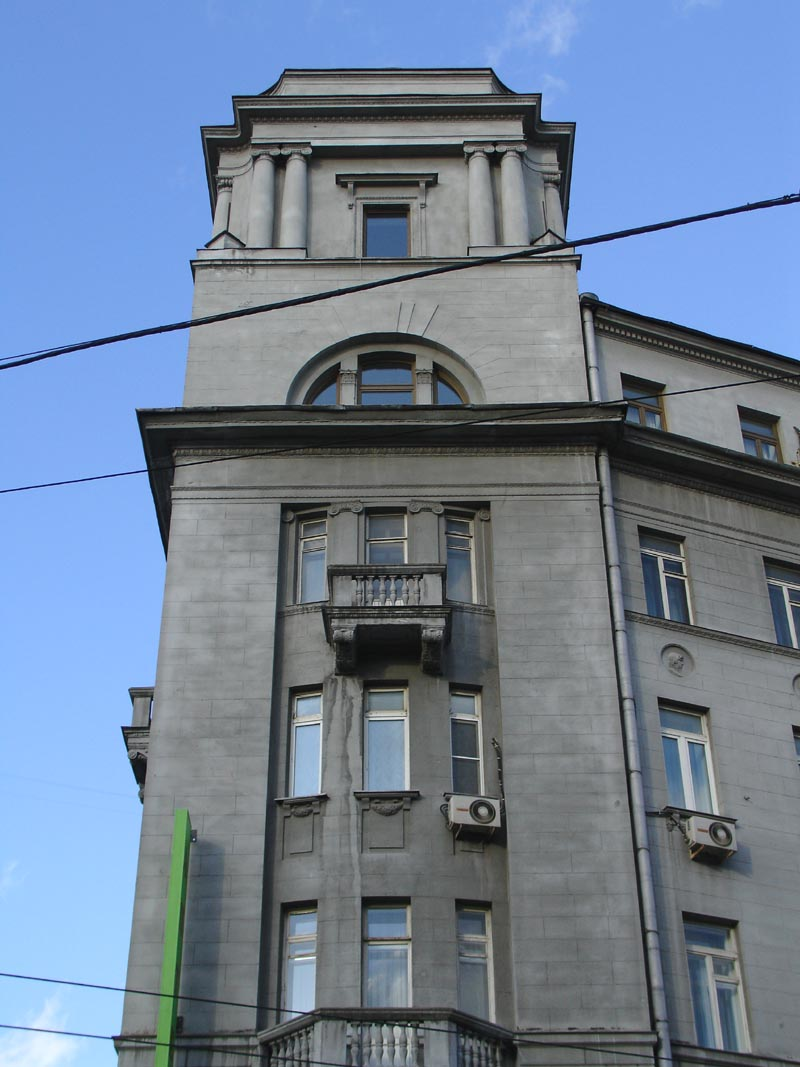
Luxury apartment blocks, like this one in Solyanka Street, Moscow, became the most visible and numerous application of the style

In early 20th century, Russian architecture (at least in Moscow) was dominated by "diverse and protean" Style Moderne, a local adaptation of Art Nouveau. This style peaked in 1900–1904, and manifested itself in the denial of classical order, flowing curvilinear shapes, floral ornaments and expensive artwork. High costs and exterior novelty limited this style to upper-class mansions, retail stores and middle-class apartment blocks. Many upper-class clients, especially in Saint Petersburg, rejected Style Moderne and insisted on traditional, neoclassical designs fitting their image of old gold. Art Nouveau never reached the "universal" status: the Church relied on Russian Revival tradition, while the charities and the majority of homeowners used the economical "red brick" eclecticism. Muscovite Neo-Grec of the 1870s–1880s was nearly forgotten, with the sole exception of Roman Klein's Pushkin Museum (1898–1912). Meanwhile, numerous Empire style cathedrals, public buildings and private mansions of the Alexandrine period that shaped central squares of Russian towns remained a nearly omnipresent, impressive statement of classicism, associated with the glorious age of the Napoleonic Wars and of Russian poetry.

In 1902, two years before Bloody Sunday, when Saint Petersburg was preparing to celebrate its bicentennial anniversary. Alexander Benois, a vocal anti-Modernist activist of the Mir Iskusstva group, defended the classical tradition of Saint Petersburg, rejecting both Art Nouveau and "official" Russian Revival, arguing that the classical city must return to its roots. In the same year, Evgeny Baumgarner specifically criticized Otto Wagner: "In leaning toward the utilitarian, he falls into an obvious absurdity. Proposing that the contemporary architect "come to terms" with the statement nothing that is not practical can be beautiful, he lowers the architectural art, praised with such feeling, to the level of an applied craft... the theory of Professor Wagner proposes aesthetic suicide. The human soul requires architectonic beauty just as human vision requires good illumination."

=== Development ===
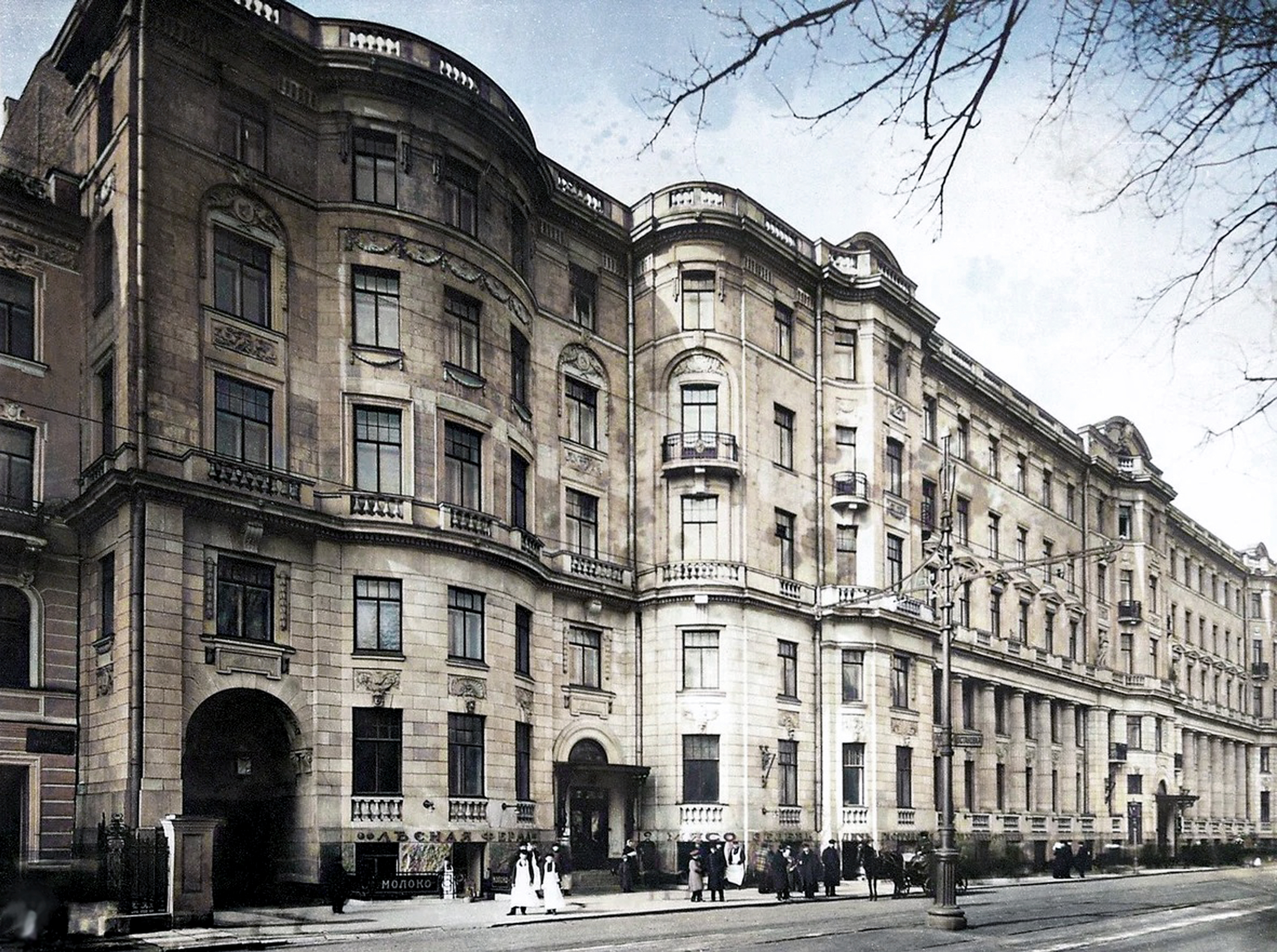
Benois House, Saint Petersburg. The building was erected in 1911–1914. Photo by Karl Bulla, 1912

Practicing architects followed Benois; for example, in 1903 Ivan Fomin, a successful 30-year-old enthusiast of Art Nouveau, switched to purely Neoclassical, Palladian architecture and returned from Moscow to Saint Petersburg to practice neoclassicism on its own territory; his studies of early 19th-century architecture, culminating in a 1911 exhibition of historical architecture, were followed by a wide public interest in classical art in general. The conceptual statement of Neoclassicism – and the term itself – were further developed in 1909 in Apollon magazine by Benois and Sergei Makovsky.

The new style took over specific niches, starting with nostalgic country estates and upper-class downtown apartment buildings. By 1914 it also became the preferred choice for schools and colleges. In Moscow, all new cinemas of the period were built in Neoclassical style, continuing the old theatrical tradition. Neoclassicists celebrated victory: "Classical tendencies in architecture have replaced the sinuously agitated, 'temperamental', and riotously 'dashing' modernistic efforts of architects like Kekushev, as well as the simplified structures faced with brilliant walls of yellow brick of architects like Schechtel." This time, the concept shifted from preservationism toward shaping a new, wholesome art, opposed to all diverse styles of the 19th century. "There was a difference, but not a leap, and here lies the subtlety of understanding the problem of neoclassicism."

=== Denial of Art Nouveau ===
A common concept of Soviet art critics linked Neoclassical Revival to the social shock of the Russian Revolution of 1905; this concept, narrowed to architecture and refined further by W. C. Brumfield, treats Neoclassicism in the architecture of 1905–1914 as a professional reaction against Art Nouveau. Russian society, shaken up by the 1905 revolution "dismissed Art Nouveau as ephemera of fashion" and settled for moderation in architecture. By the end of hostilities, moderate Neoclassicism emerged as an ethically acceptable alternative to extravagance of the past. Prior to 1905, Saint Petersburg architects completed 30 buildings in Neoclassical Revival style (about 5% of extant Neoclassical buildings). Five years, 1905–1910, added 140 new buildings. By 1910, Saint Petersburg reached an equilibrium between Neoclassical Revival and Art Nouveau (in terms of new buildings launched and completed). Ivan Fomin specifically praised the universal, easy-to-reproduce set of classical rules, consolidating the profession: "When the style was being formed, all the masters in the capital and the provinces worked toward the same end, not fearing to imitate one another. And in this is the guarantee of strength."

By 1914, Revivalists had clearly won, but their victory was not universal. A large share of intellectuals despised the Empire style as a symbol of the slavery and militarization of the Alexandrine period. Ilya Repin publicly condemned it as a lust for luxuries of "the filthy Arakcheyev period, and all the harshness of living suffered by millions, which are now free" (Russian: "Он напоминает мне поганое время Аракчеева и всей связанной с этим временем тягости жизни миллионов теперь свободных людей").

=== Alternative to eclecticism ===
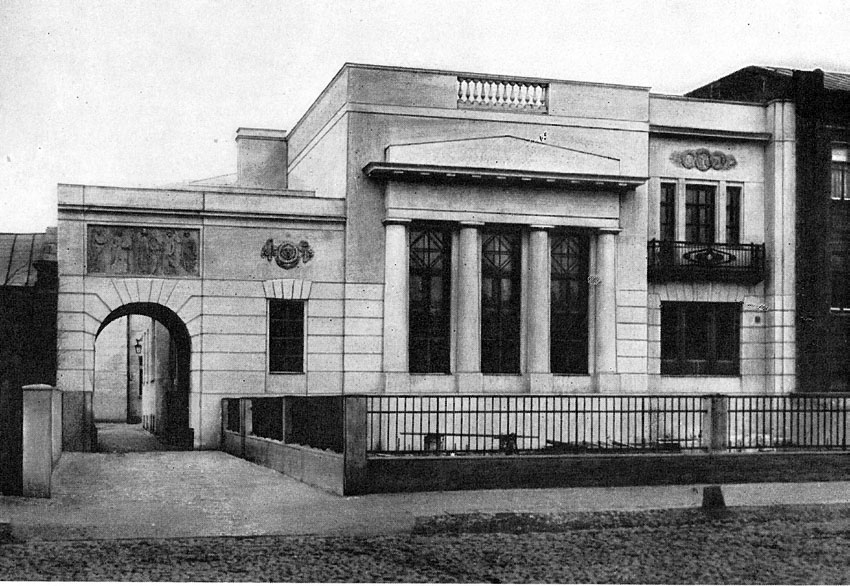
Fyodor Schechtel, probably the most significant figure in Russian Art Nouveau, built his own house in Neoclassical style.

Contemporary domestic authors dismiss the concept outlined above as an oversimplification. Reaction against Art Nouveau did exist, but was only a secondary, tangential factor behind Neoclassical Revival. Statements by Benois in 1902 and 1909 targeted the ideology of eclecticism in general. Neoclassicism of the early 20th century extended far beyond denial of a rival style, pretending to create a wholesome realm of art in all its forms. This viewpoint is indirectly supported by the fact that there was no clear-cut boundary between two styles. Art Nouveau artists, starting with Otto Wagner and Gustav Klimt, relied on Greek heritage. Neoclassical architects followed the same Gesamtkunst approach to interior and exterior finishes, and relied on the work of the same craftsmen and factories. Architects (Fyodor Schechtel) and painters (Mstislav Dobuzhinsky) created pure examples of both styles. Despite the magazine critique, various forms of Art Nouveau persisted until the Russian Revolution of 1917, which halted all construction altogether.

Neoclassical projects in Saint Petersburg emerged when Art Nouveau was still in its infancy, years before the 1902 magazine campaign. The Russian Ethnographic Museum was established in 1900, the Petrovskaya Embankment in 1901, and the Public Library in 1896.

The importance of clients and their tastes, which is emphasized in the traditional conception, is also disputed. Architects were not simple contractors; many were also wealthy property developers, betting their own money (Roman Klein, Nikita Lazarev and Ernst Nirnsee). They were part of a wider movement in arts, led by writers and painters who, unlike architects, were not bound by investors. The artists themselves changed the tastes of general public.

Contemporaries clearly identified revival of the Empire style as a part of a larger trend seeking the way out of the apparently insoluble crisis of the fin de siècle; Art Nouveau and decadence in general were perceived as the least of threats. As Nikolai Berdyaev stated in 1910, "Modern age joins the ranks of Goethe ... a clear reaction against mounting catastrophes – the catastrophe of Nietzsche and his Übermensch, the catastrophe of Marx and his socialist judgement day, and the catastrophe of falling into abyss of decadence."

== Style defined ==
=== Repossession of simplicity ===
Depending on the function of the building, purity of the style varied from refined Palladian legacy in luxury mansions to superficial, shallow decorations of utilitarian apartment blocks. All these buildings share one feature: "Repossession of Simplicity. Geometry of basic shapes, clean surfaces... returned the integrity and monumentality that was lost in second half of 19th century" ("Обретение простоты... геометризация объемов, очищение плоскости возвращали архитектуре черты слитности, монументальности, утраченные во второй половине 19 века").

Pure revival of the Empire style was limited to temporary exhibition projects and suburban and country mansions, where abundant land allowed low but wide symmetrical layouts. Rarely, as in the case of Vtorov's mansion, the same approach was reproduced in downtown residences or in public buildings (Museum of Ethnography in Saint Petersburg). Typical Saint Petersburg construction projects of that period already passed the 5-story mark, unheard of in early 19th century, and needed careful adaptation of Neoclassical spirit to the new scale. Early attempts at mechanical, superfluous attachment of columns and porticos to ordinary apartment blocks failed; by 1912 the problem was resolved, most notably by Vladimir Shchuko. His Markov Apartments suggested two ways of handling the scale: either by use of the giant order, with pilasters running the whole height of the building, or by adaptation of earlier Palladian motifs; both relied on expensive natural stone finishes and modern structural engineering. The result "combined classical elements in a monumental design that is neither historical nor modern. Shchuko developed a style appropriate for contemporary urban architecture, one that provided material evidence of the classical values."

=== Fragmentation of the movement ===
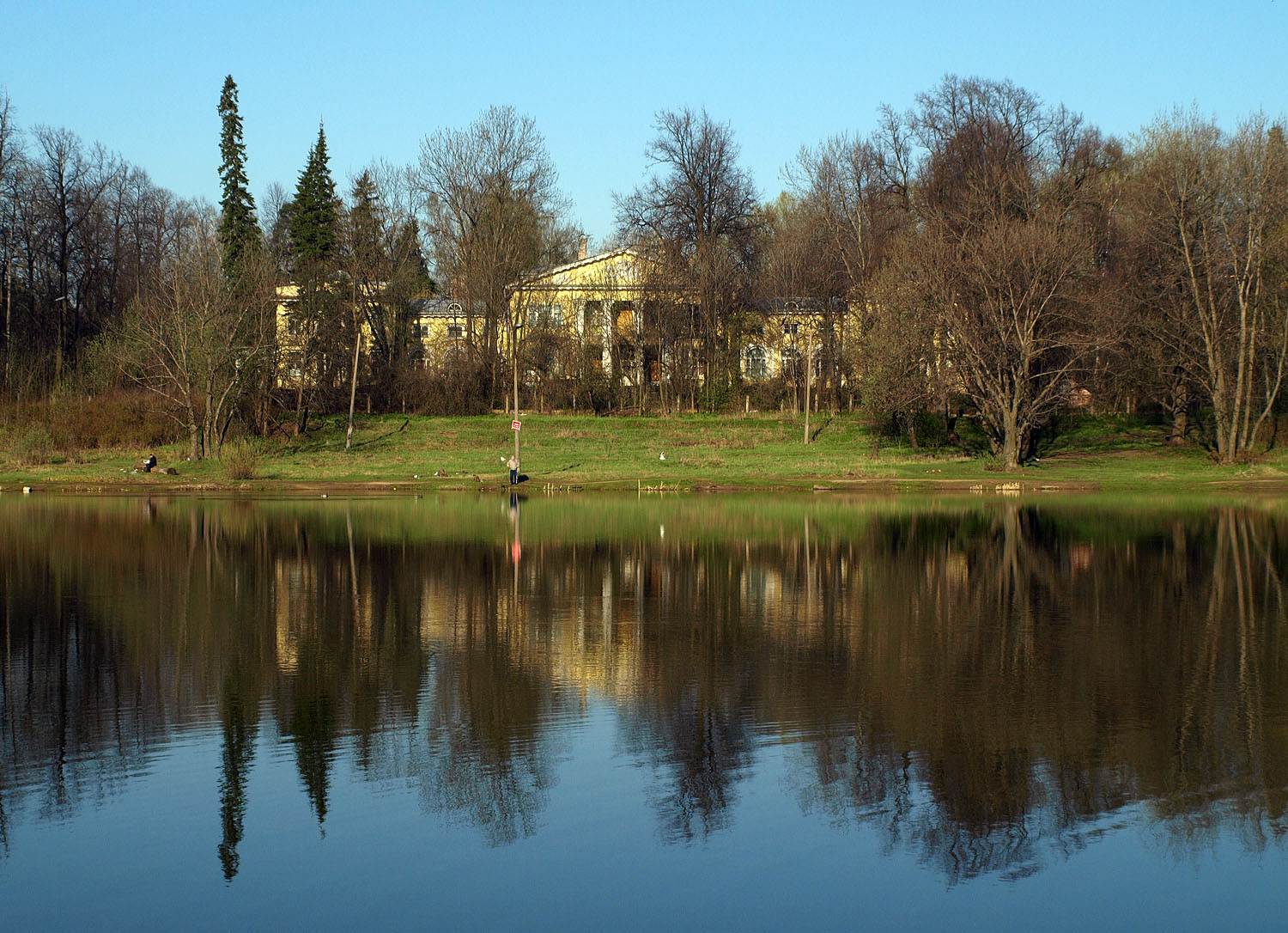
Vinogradovo estate near Moscow by Ivan Zholtovsky, 1911–1914. Zholtovsky, an enthusiast of the Italian Renaissance, complied with the client's wish to recreate an Empire style atmosphere.

The new trend, favored by investors, naturally attracted opportunistic practitioners of other styles; the move was simplified by the fact that all graduates of professional schools had formal classical training (more prominent in the Imperial Academy of Arts and the Moscow School, less so in Byzantine-oriented Institute of Civil Engineering). The growing Neoclassical community spun off separate revivalist groups with their own stylistic codes.

Baroque Revival, the earliest of these schools, was popularized by Mir Iskusstva and flourished in Saint Petersburg, notably in the Peter the Great school building designed by Alexander Dmitriev in collaboration with Alexander Benois and Mir Iskusstva artists. This municipal project began in 1902, and the city specifically requested Baroque style to commemorate its founder; final drafts were approved only in 1908. In the same year the city held an international exhibition, designed in Petrine Baroque. The Baroque trend in graphic arts was popularized by Lev Ilyin and Nikolay Lanceray.

Renaissance Revival was practiced by Ivan Zholtovsky in Moscow and Marian Lyalevich, Marian Peretiatkovich and Vladimir Shchuko in Saint Petersburg. Their first statements of Neo-Renaissance were completed in 1910–1912. Peretiatkovich died prematurely and did not leave a lasting following, while Zholtovsky created his own professional school that persisted from 1918 to his death in 1959. However, in 1905–1914 he completed only a few Neo-Renaissance buildings; the bulk of his work of this period belong to pure Neoclassicism. On the contrary, the number of Neo-Renaissance projects in 1910s Saint Petersburg was great enough for that style to become a lasting trend; the works of Schuko and Lyalevich were instantly copied by lesser-known followers. Alexander Benois and Georgy Lukomsky, now disillusioned by superfluous copying of Empire style motives, welcomed the "stern tastes of Italian architects".

Modernized Neoclassicism, not related to Russian heritage or its Palladian roots, was exemplified in the new building of the German Embassy in Saint Isaac's Square, designed by Peter Behrens in 1911 and completed by Mies van der Rohe in 1912. The red granite building combined heavy-set, simplified shape with 14 giant columns, and was unusually functional, well-lit and ventilated inside. Contemporaries detested its style as "Teutonic architecture", but quarter of a century later it perfectly fitted in the concept of both Stalinist and Nazi architecture. A similar trend, although not as radical, was emerging among Moscow architects.

== War, revolution and post-war development ==
The last examples of Neoclassical Revival were laid down shortly before the outbreak of World War I. Independent developers in Moscow started a number of unconnected large housing projects; the advent of the elevator allowed them to reach the 9-story mark. These buildings, usually called cloudbreakers (Russian: тучерезы), usually appeared outside of the Garden Ring: the city restricted high-rise construction in the historical center, including the ban on Ivan Mashkov's 13-story tower in Tverskaya Square that could become Moscow's first skyscraper. In Saint Petersburg, Ivan Fomin and Fyodor Lidwal started redevelopment of Goloday Island – a residential park spanning over one square kilometer, the largest single project of the period. It materialized only in part; Moscow projects were mostly complete during the war, while some remained unfinished into the 1920s.

After the Russian Revolution of 1917 the movement lost its leaders in literature (Ivan Bunin) and the fine arts (Benois, Dobuzhinsky) to emigration. Some of the architects, especially those based in Saint Petersburg or having foreign citizenship (Fyodor Lidwal, Noy Seligson) emigrated too; some, like Ernst Nirnsee, disappeared in the fog of war. However, the influential architects who shaped the Neoclassical movement (Fomin, Ivan Kuznetsov, Mayat, Schuko, Rerberg, Zholtovsky) remained in Soviet Russia and quickly restored their role as leaders of the profession. Zholtovsky, who was at the helm of VKhuTEMAS architectural school in 1918–1922, temporarily emigrated to Italy after a revolt of modernist students ousted him from his chair; Zholtovsky returned in 1926, and was immediately awarded with a string of new projects – both Renaissance and Constructivist. Other neoclassicists of his generation also had to modernize their art to some extent, and had successful practice in the second half of the 1920s, producing high-profile buildings (Rerberg's Central Telegraph, Fomin's Dinamo Building in Moscow).

Most urban Neoclassical buildings of 1905–1914 survived the Soviet period quite well – they were, in fact, the most recently constructed pre-revolution buildings, and despite inadequate maintenance their initial quality was high enough to stand unaltered for nearly a century. Many have lost original interiors; in the decade following World War II some of Moscow's apartment buildings were built up (adding two or three stories was a common and inexpensive solution to the housing shortage), but their external styling survived. Another wave of reconstruction that started in the 1990s and continues to the present day has resulted in numerous instances of facadist rebuilding. Pure, unaltered examples of the style are nevertheless quite common. Nationalized country estates, on the contrary, did not fare just as well. Their new functions (ranging from almshouses to military headquarters) sooner or later called for alteration and expansion; new owners had no incentive to preserve the original buildings. Frequently they were abandoned and left to decay, especially after World War II depopulated the countryside.

== Gallery ==
=== Private residences, Moscow ===
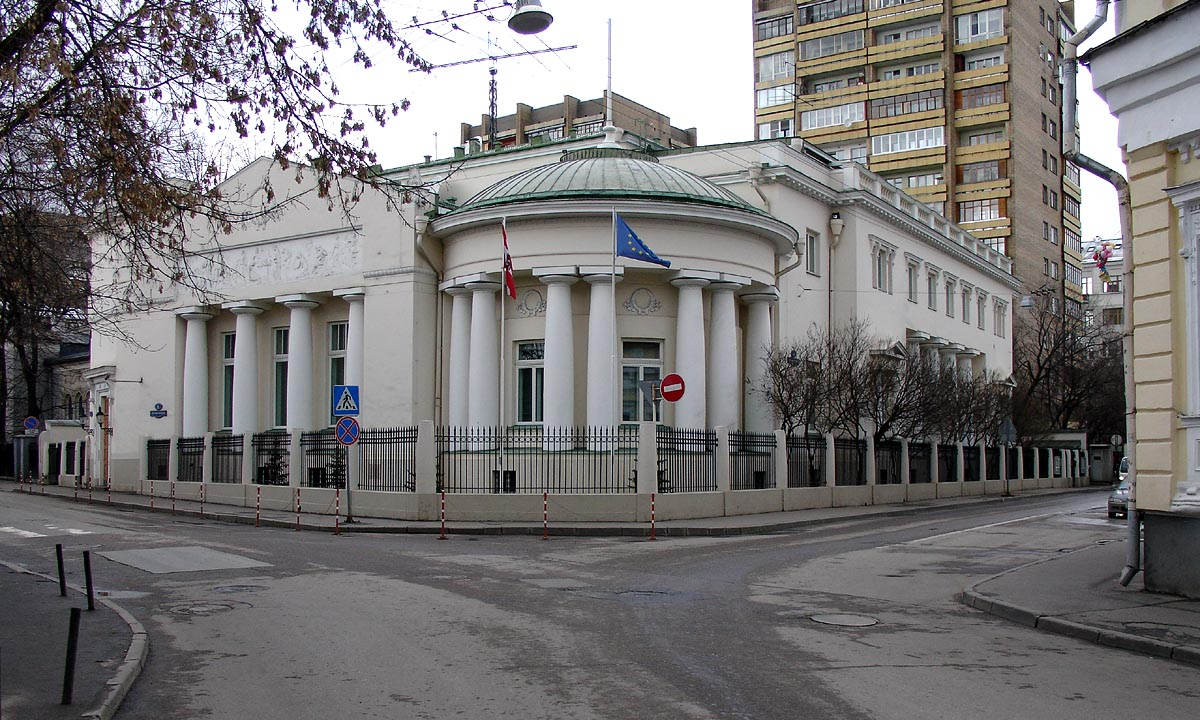
Nikita Lazarev, 1906

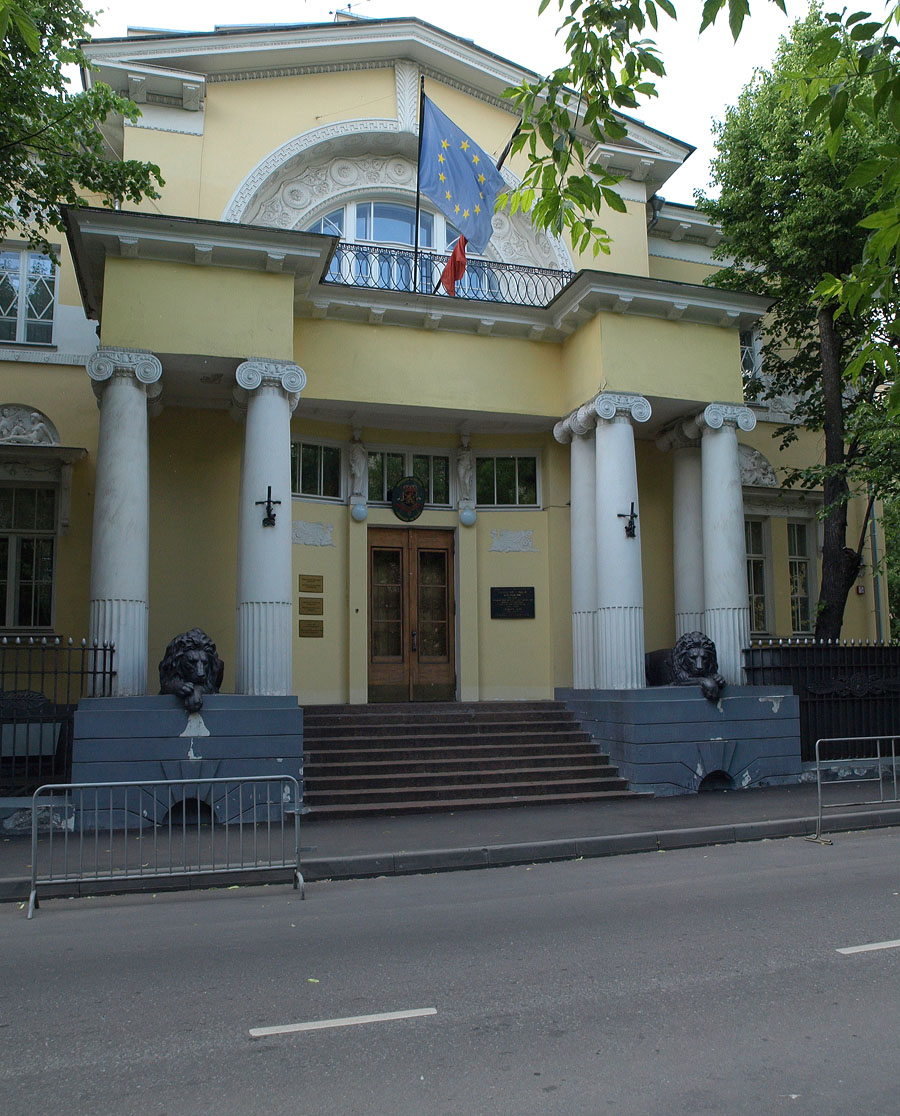
Boris Velikovsky, 1909–1910

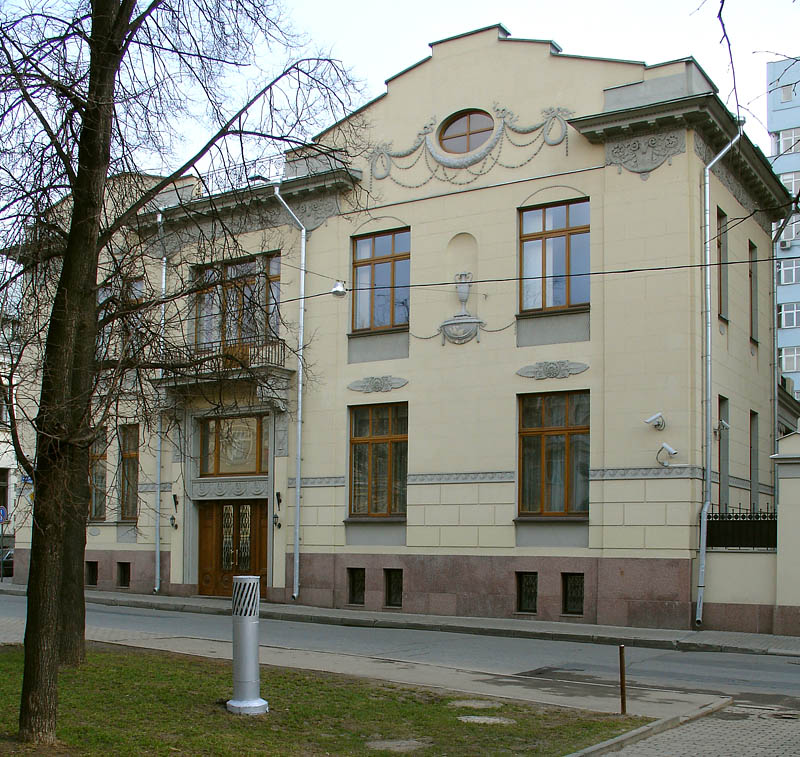
Mikhail Geisler, 1909–1910

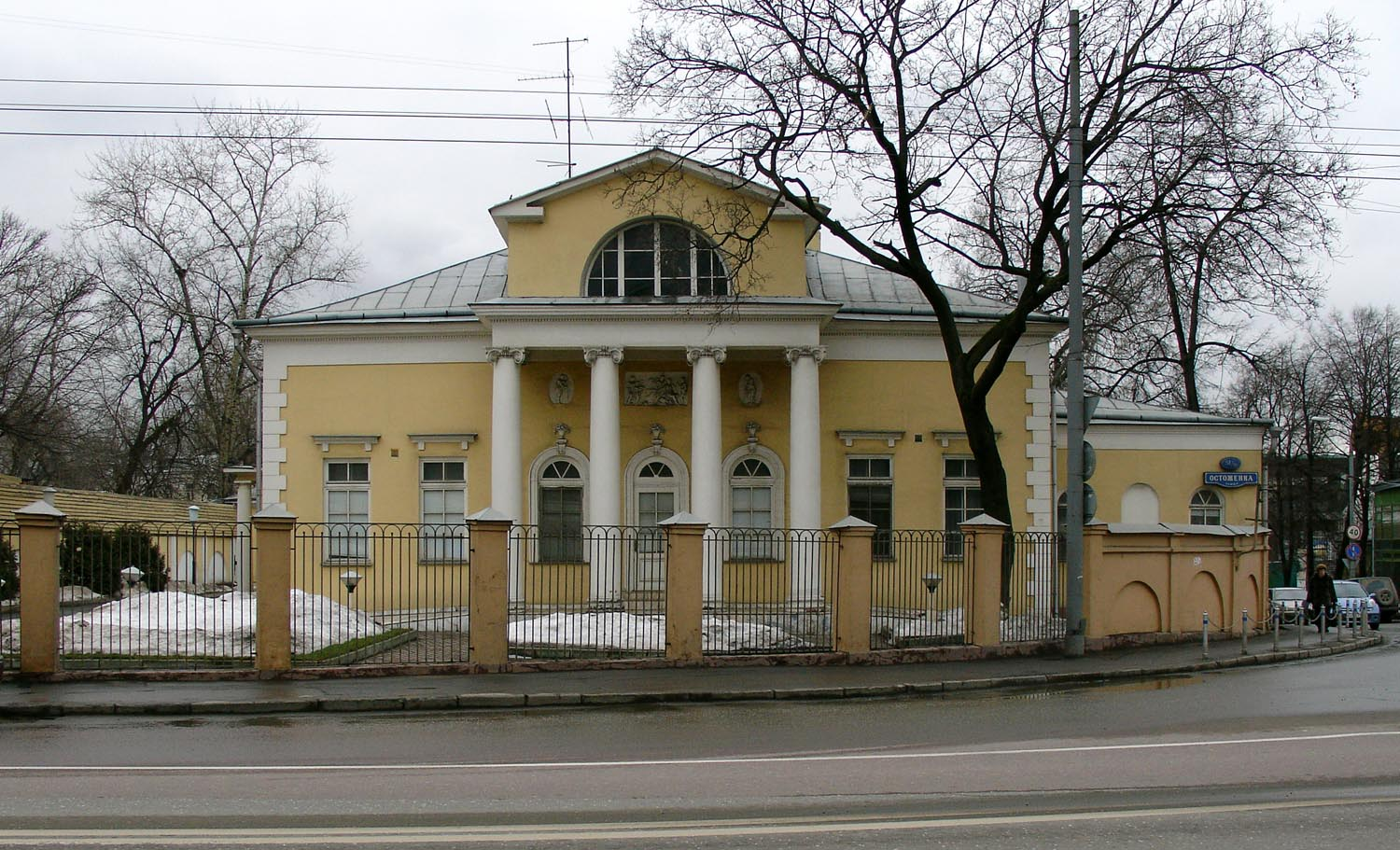
Sergei Chernyshov, 1914–1916

=== Apartment buildings, Moscow ===
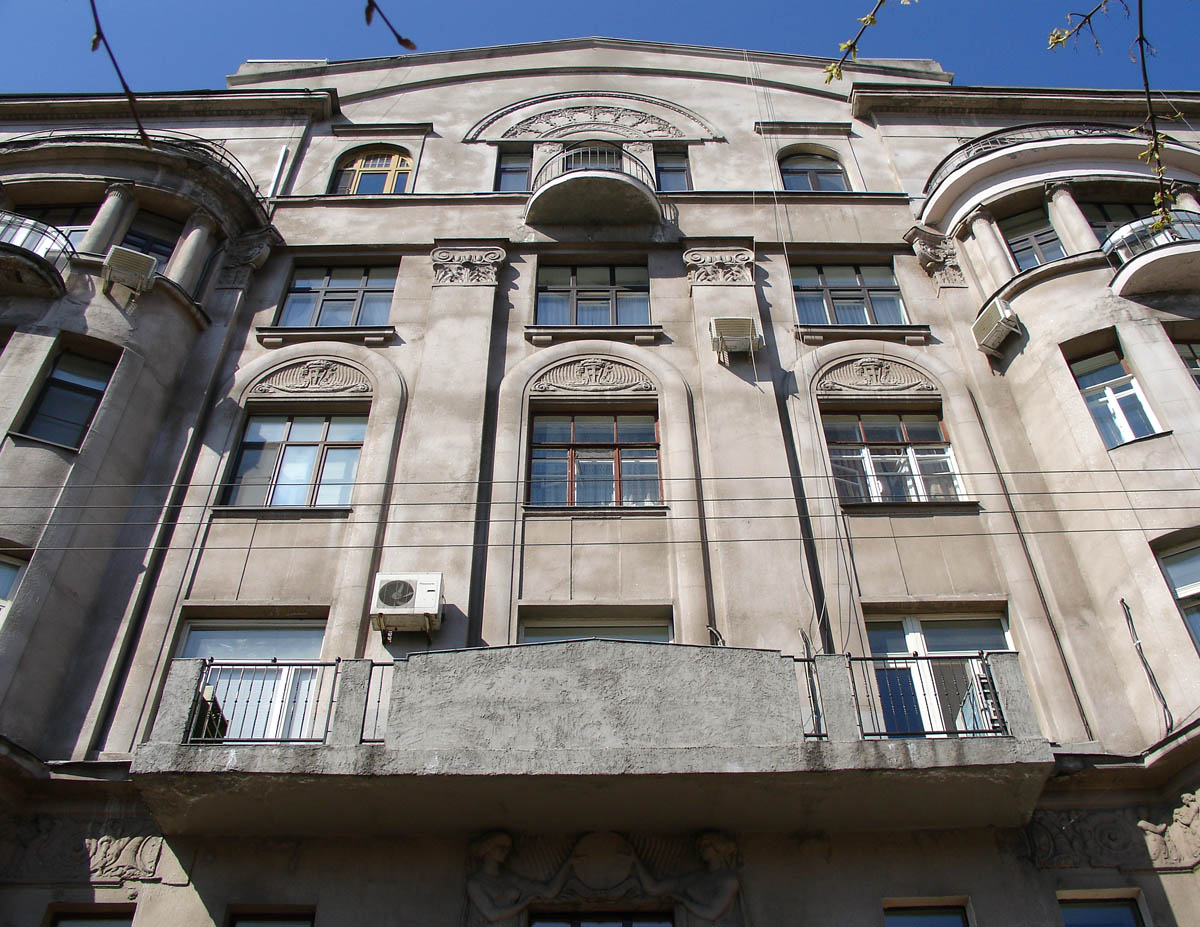
Boris Velikovsky, 1907

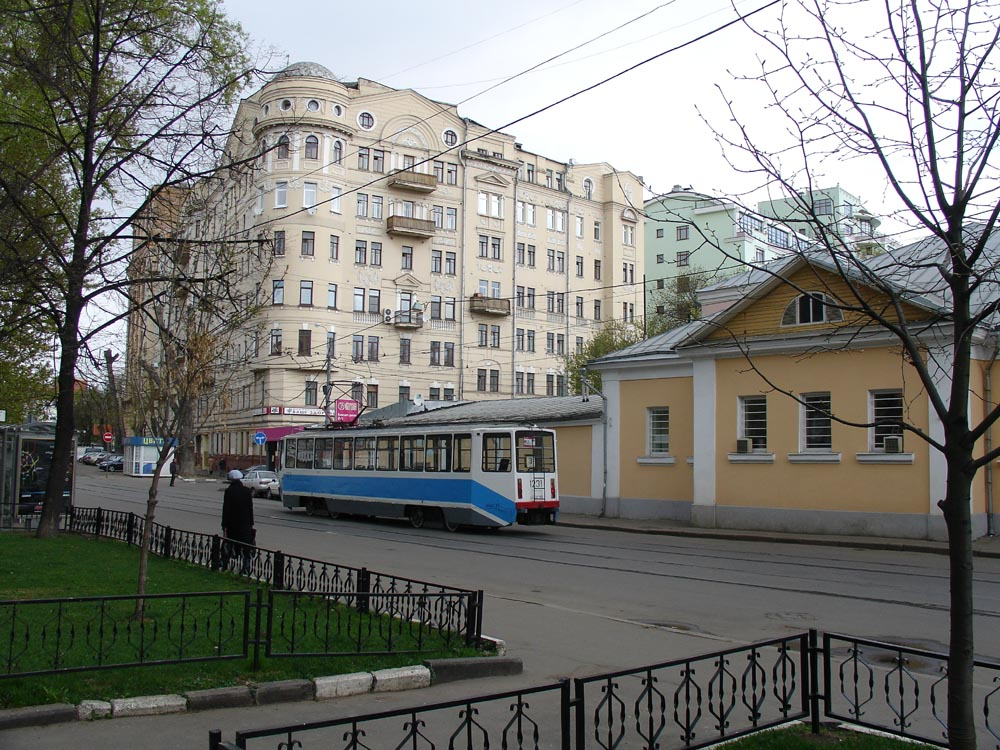
Ernst Nirnsee, 1912–1913

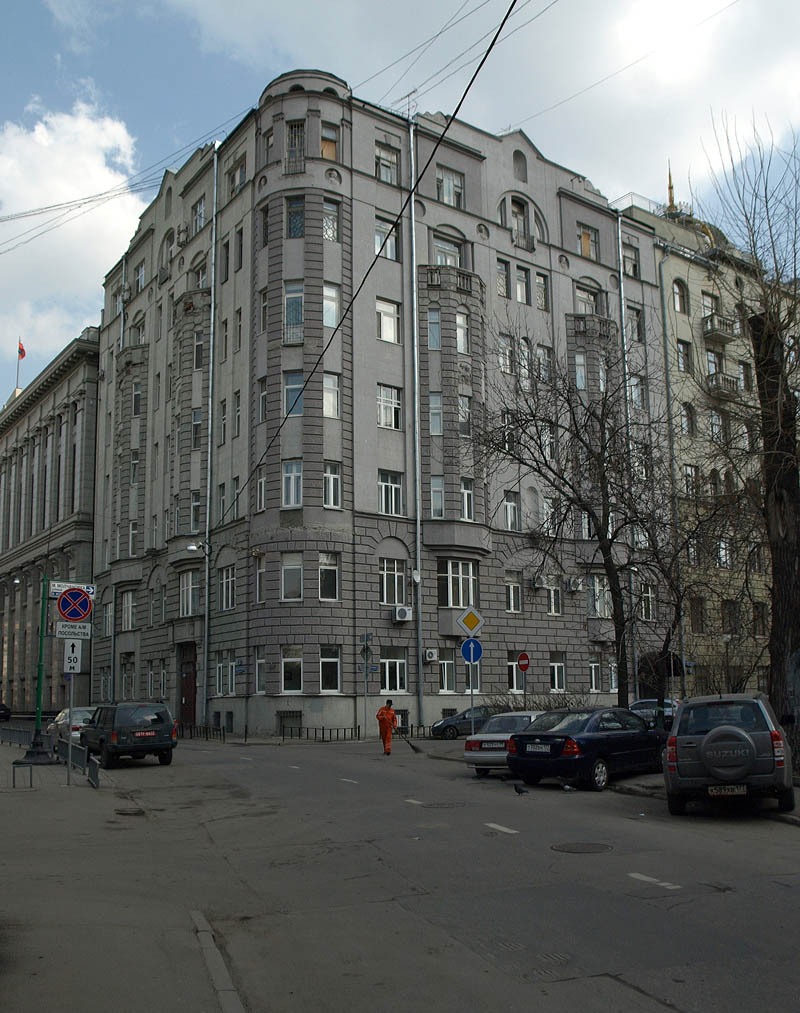
Nikolay Strukov, 1914

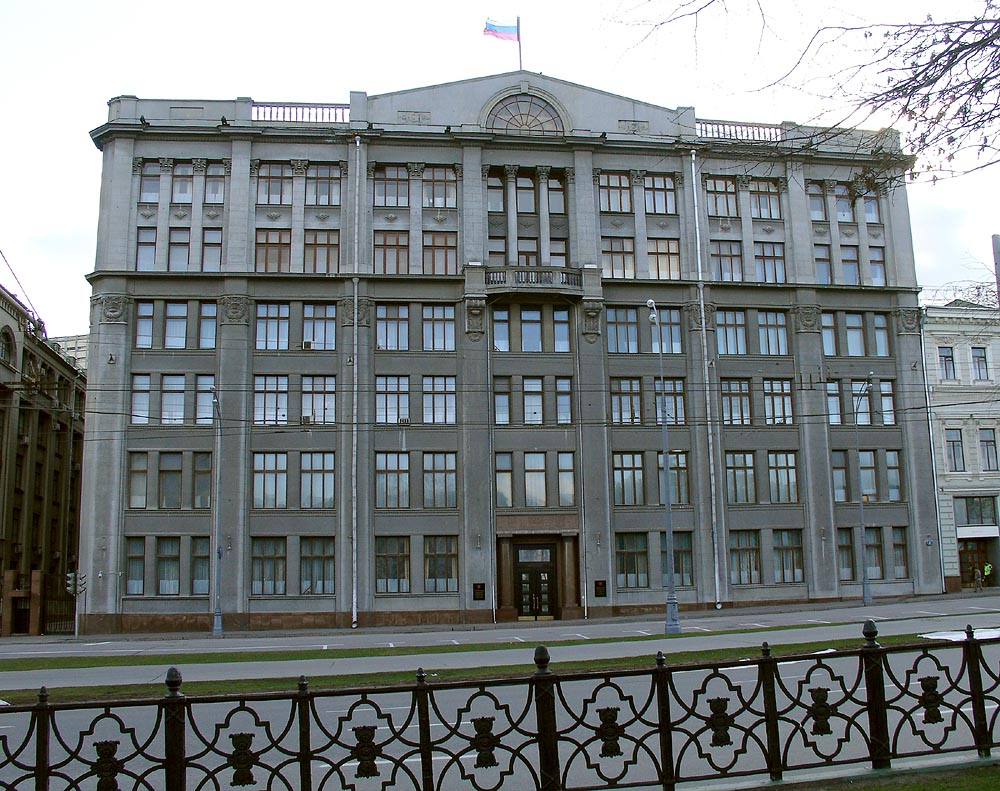
Vladimir Sherwood (Jr.), 1912–1915

=== Public and office buildings ===
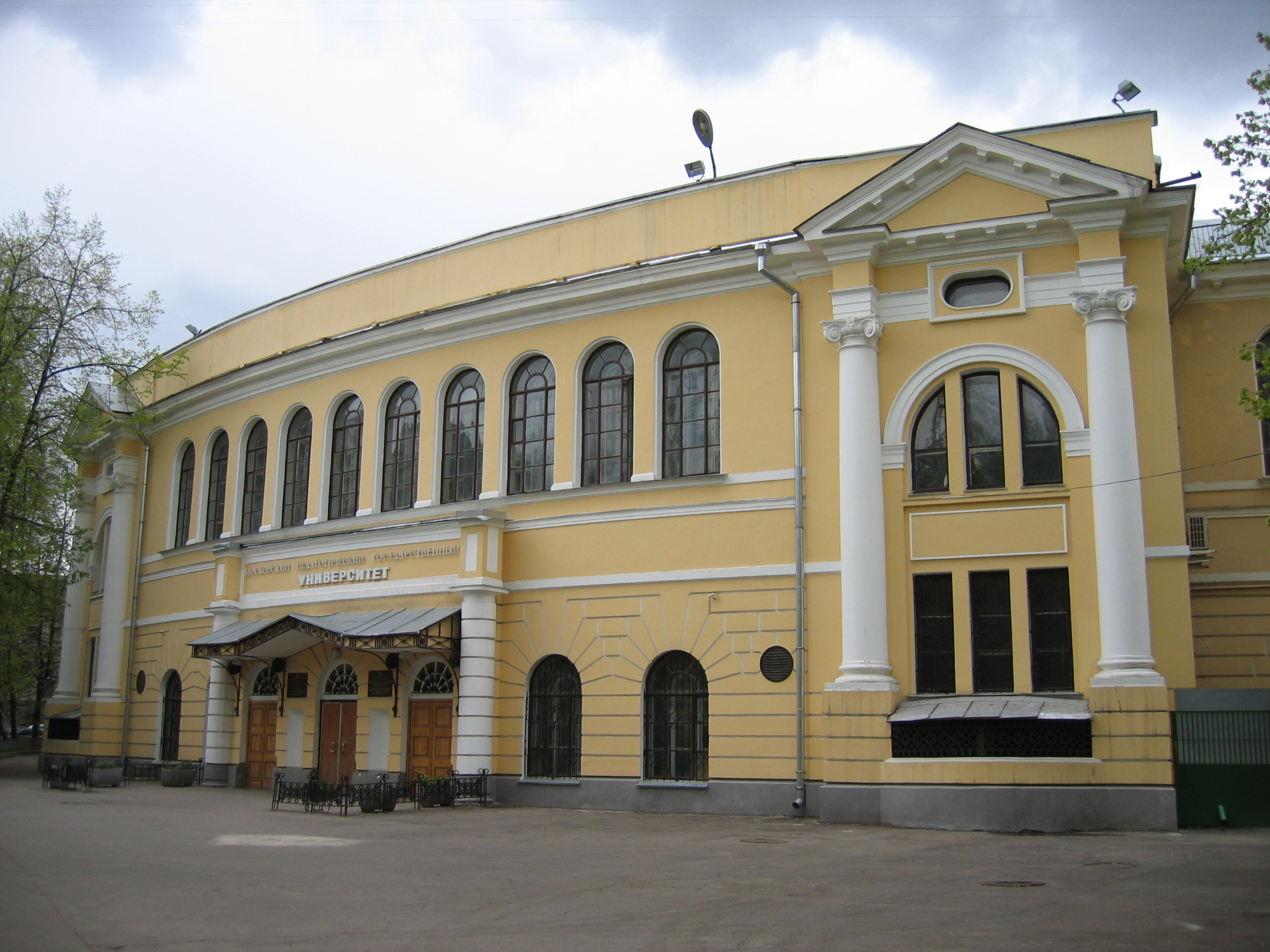
Sergey Solovyov, 1910–1914

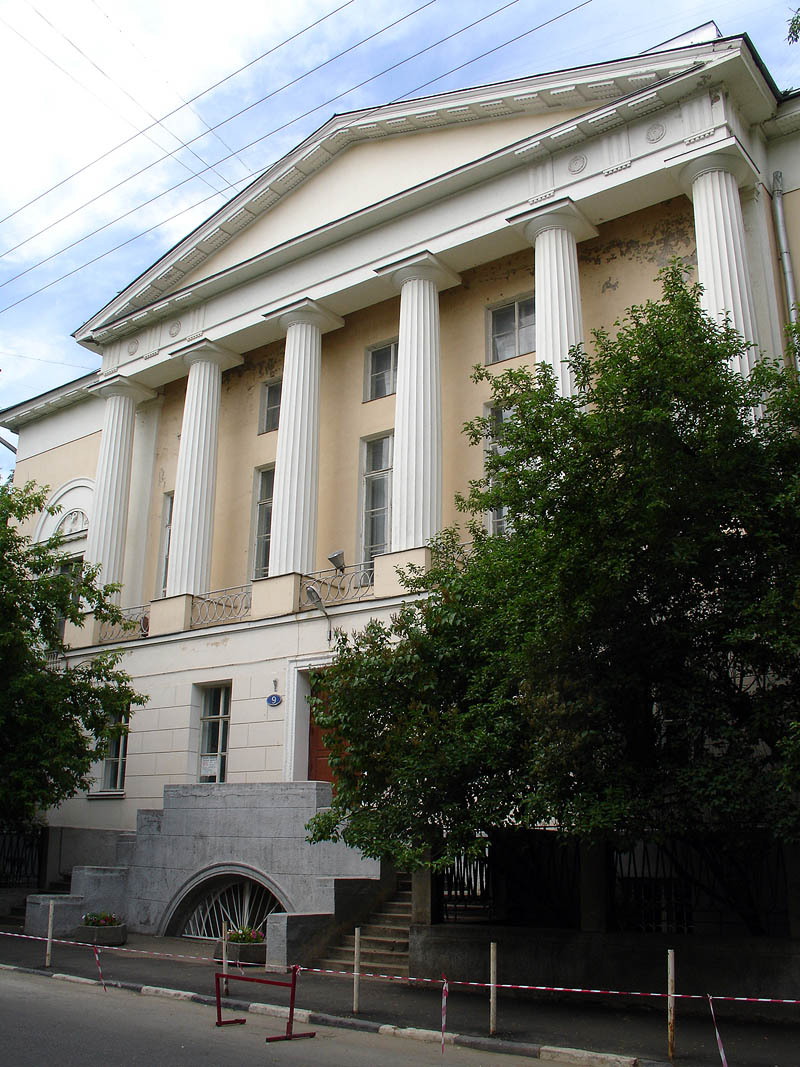
Ivan Rerberg, 1912

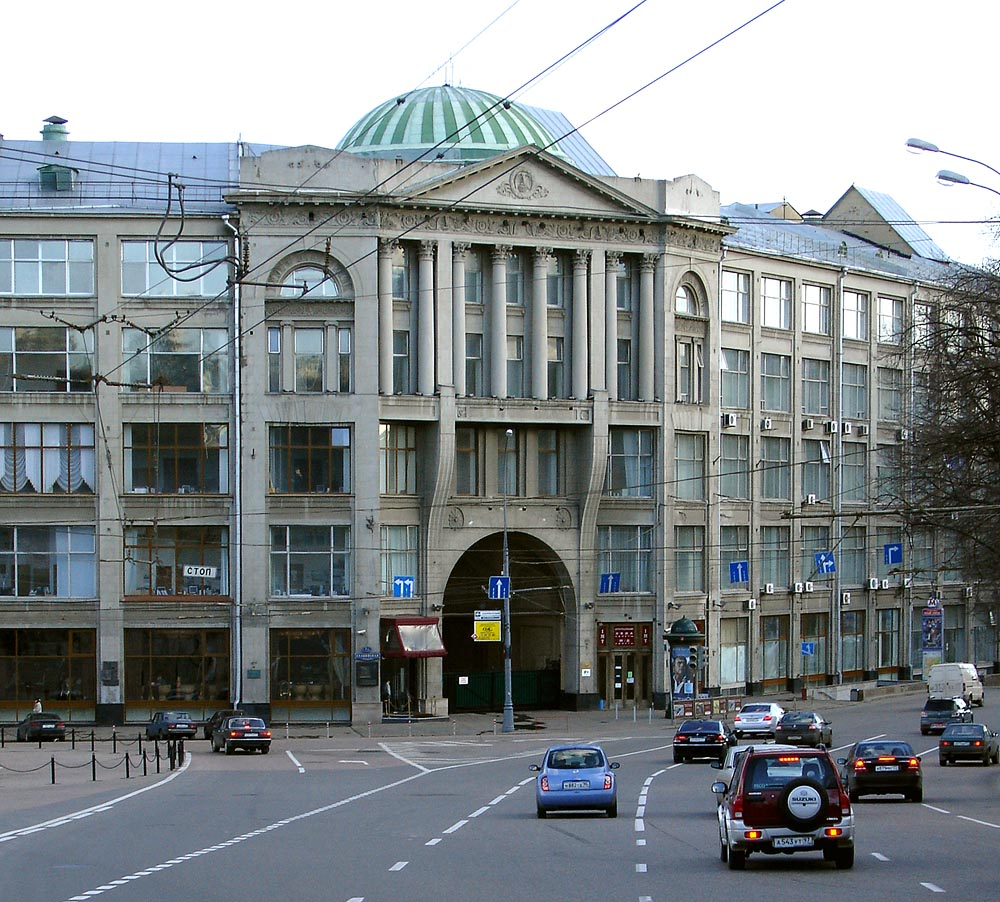
Ivan Kuznetsov, 1911–1913

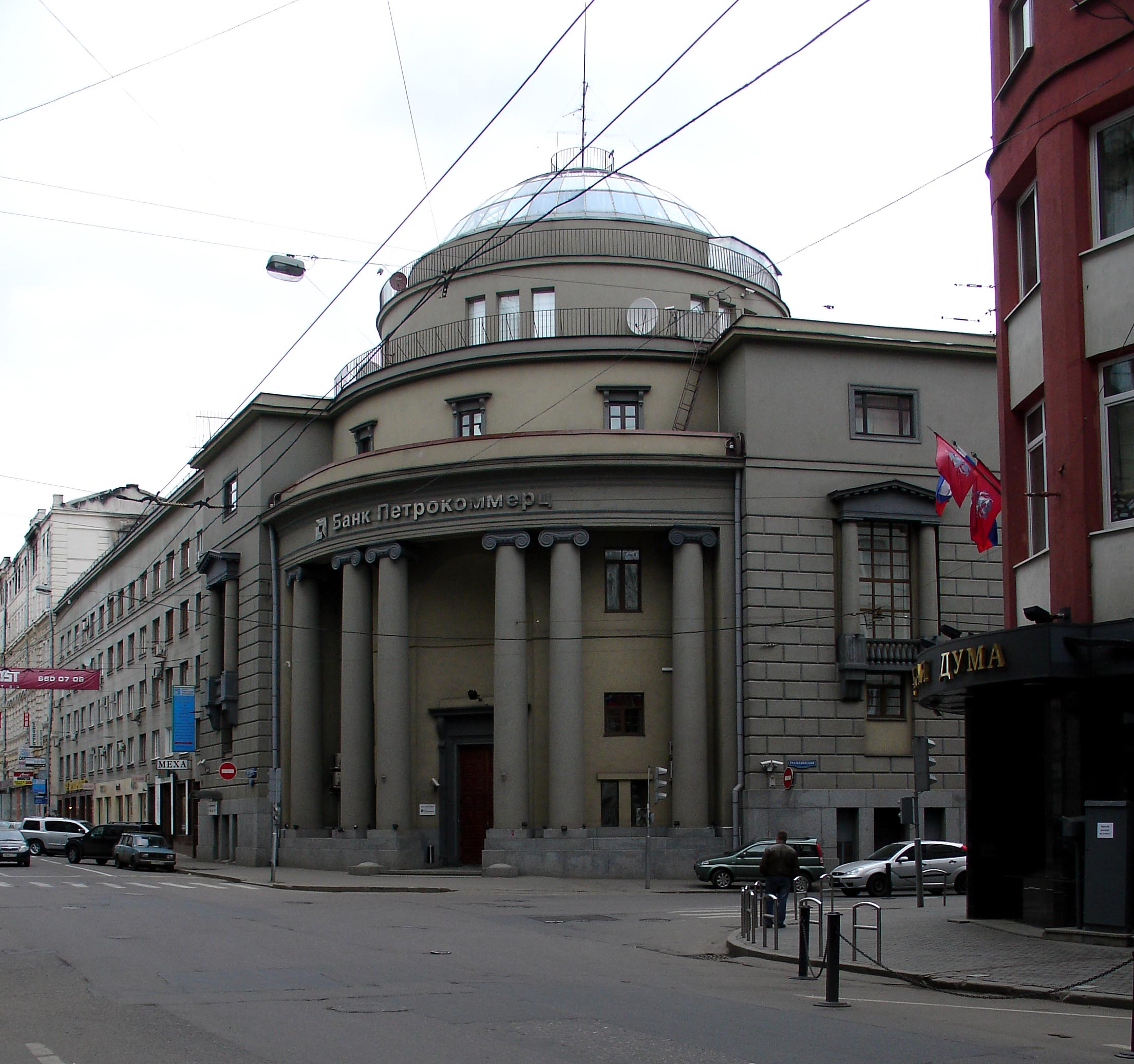
Illarion Ivanov-Schitz, 1914–1920
