= Ivan Kuznetsov (architect) =

Russian architect

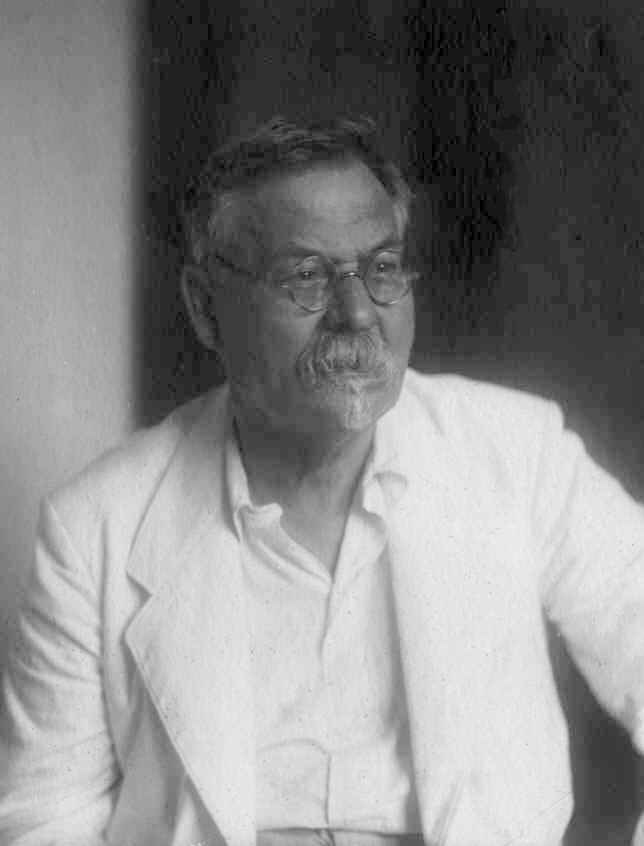
- Born: Ivan Sergeyevich Kuznetsov; 27 May 1867; Poretskoye, Vladimir Oblast
- Died: 3 June 1942 (aged 75); Moscow
- Occupation: Architect
- Buildings: Savvinskoe Podvorie (1905-1907), Red Church (1909), Delovoy Dvor (1911-1913)

Ivan Sergeyevich Kuznetsov (Russian: Иван Серге́евич Кузнецов) (May 27, 1867 – June 3, 1942) was a Russian architect primarily known for his pre-1917 works in Moscow and Vichuga. Born into a working-class family, Kuznetsov independently broke into the elite architecture society of Moscow. He worked in many different styles but was most successful in Neoclassical architecture and Russian Revival. He excelled in industrial architecture and designed more than 600 buildings through the commissions of Nikolay Vtorov. Kuznetsov remained in high demand during the Soviet period.

== Biography ==
Kuznetsov was born on May 27, 1867, the son of a peasant-mason in Porteskoye, a settlement in Vladimir Oblast. In 1884, Kuznetsov was accepted to the Moscow School of Painting, Sculpture and Architecture, and completed his schooling in 1889 with a Big Silver Medal, granting him the right to oversee construction work. From 1887 to 1895, he was assistant to Fyodor Schechtel, and from 1889 he was working for the Department of Empress Maria (charitable branch of the Imperial government). From 1895 to 1900, Kuznetsov continued his studies in the Imperial Academy of Arts. He studied in Europe, and received the degree of an artist-architect.

In the 1890s he designed factories, and civic buildings in the Ivanovo Oblast for the Krasilshikov family in Vichuga. In Moscow, Kuznetsov became close to merchant families Bayev and Medvednikov. Among the major early constructions of Kuznetsov was the Medvednikov grammar school (Russian: Медведниковская гимназия) in Moscow, which became a model for public buildings in the Art Nouveau style. Then, in the first half of the 1900s, Kuznetsov restored the frescoes and decoration in Assumption Cathedral of Joseph-Volokolamsk Monastery, as well as in the Epiphany Cathedral at Elokhovo.

Kuznetsov was a prominent member of the Kadet party and member of Moscow Duma.

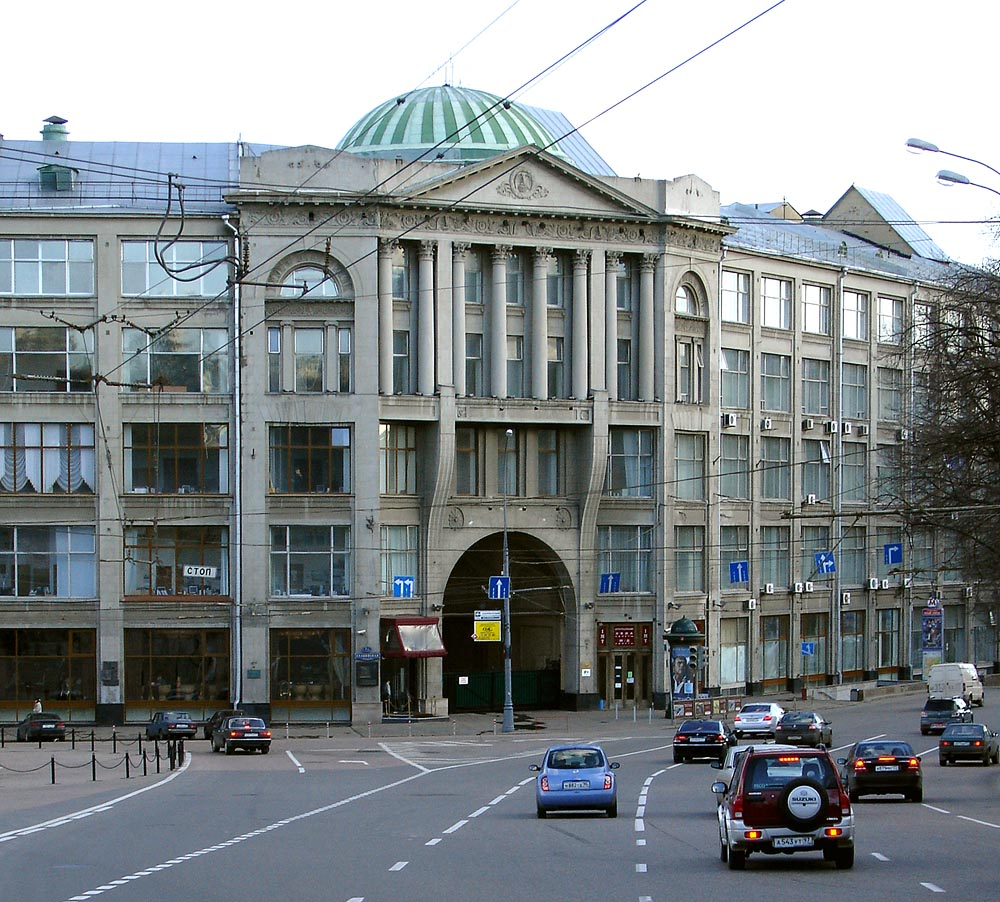
"Delovoy Dvor"

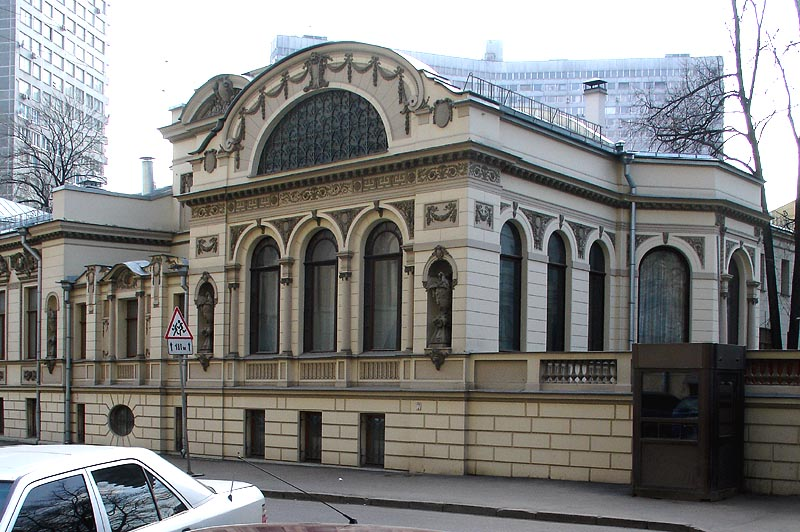
Povarskaya Street, 9

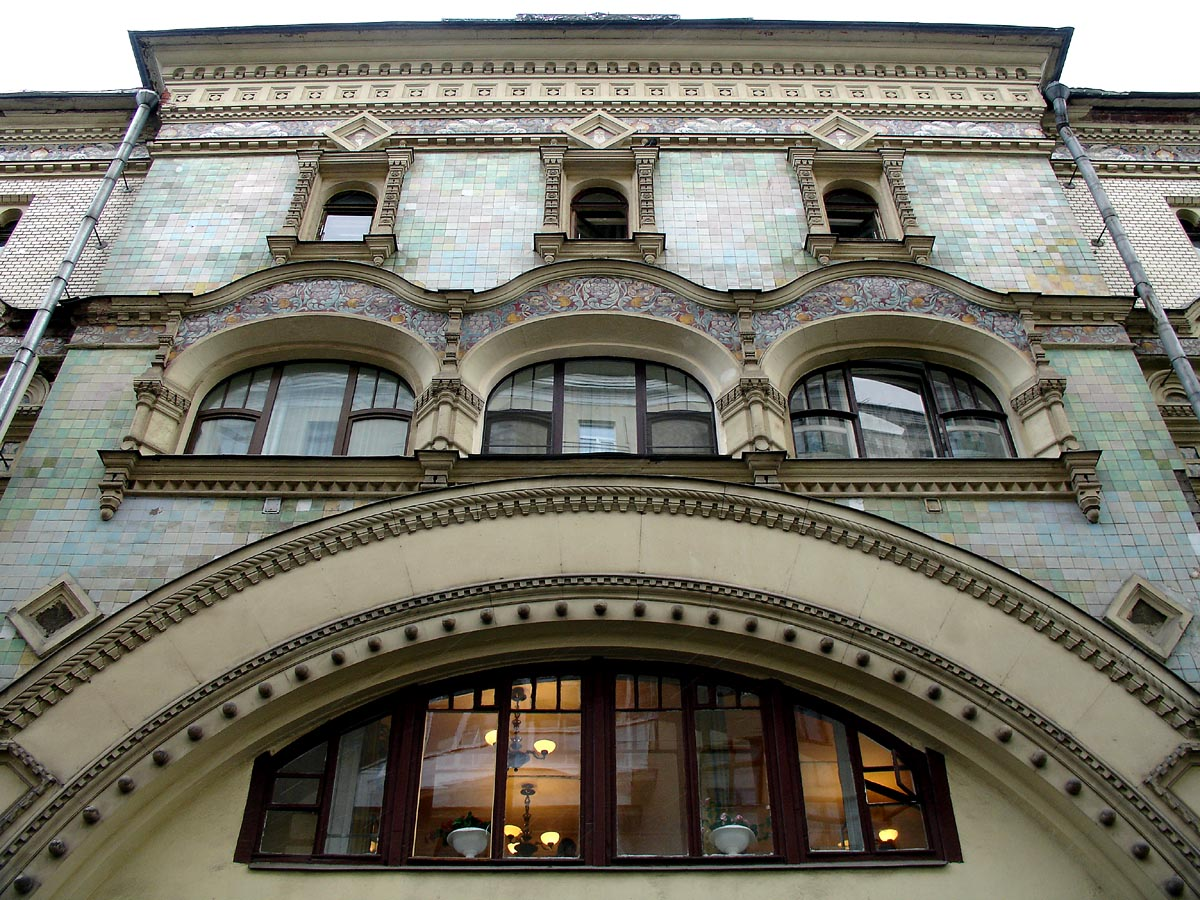
Savvinskoye Podvorie

In 1905-1907, Kuznetsov built his most known building - nowadays hidden behind facades of newer buildings on Tverskaya Street - Savvinskoye Podvorie (Metochion) (Russian: Саввинское подворье). This was his first and very successful work with Abramtsevo maiolica workshop (Russian: Абрамцевская гончарная мануфактура); Abramtsevo's tiles define the entire look of this building. Cooperation with Abramtsevo continued through 1908-1910, when, by the commission of Ivan Kokorev, Kuznetsov built Voznesenski Temple in Tesino near Vichuga, usually called Red Church (Russian: Вознесенский храм - Красная церковь). Kuznetsov also built temples and monastic housing in Joseph-Volokolamsk Monastery. Later in Moscow, by commission from Nikolay Vtorov, Kuznetsov built a large business complex – "Delovoy Dvor" (Russian: Деловой Двор) – in the strict neoclassical style.

In the years of World War I Kuznetsov remained one of the most popular architects working on the defense contracts. He built weapons factories for Vtorov and Mikhelson in Moscow, Serpukhov, Zatishye (Elektrostal), Bogorodsk (Noginsk).

Kuznetsov in Soviet years refrained from political discussions and worked for the Soviet construction industry until his death; with his last position being the chief architect of the Sochi resort (beginning from 1937). He died 3 June 1942, and was buried at the Vvedenskoye Cemetery in Moscow.

== Major Buildings ==
- 1905-1907 Savvinskoye Podvorie (Metochion of Savvino-Storozhevsky monastery in Zvenigorod) Tverskaya Street, 6, Moscow
- 1909 Church of Resurrection (Red Church, Russian: Церковь Воскресения Христова) in Tesino (now Vichuga) on 1st Bibliotechnaya St.
- 1911-1913 Business Court complex ("Delovoy Dvor", Russian: «Деловой двор») Slavyanskaya Square, 2, Moscow
