= 1917 Kronstadt Mutiny =

Beginning on 28 February [O.S.] 1917, an uprising occurred among the sailors stationed at the Kronstadt naval base, in response to the unrest taking place in Petrograd. Almost the entire garrison stationed at the naval base participated in the mutiny, during which many naval officers were either killed or imprisoned by the rebellious sailors, including the commander-in-chief Admiral Wiren.

== Background ==
During the time of the mutiny, the Kronstadt naval base was the principal rear-base of the Baltic Fleet, and protected the city of Petrograd (St Petersburg). The majority of the population of the island of Kronstadt consisted of soldiers and sailors, with the latter being heavily politicised and described as possessing a strong class consciousness.

The Kronstadt naval base had previously been the site of mutinies in 1905 and 1906.

== Mutiny ==
=== Beginning of uprising ===
In the afternoon of 28 February, the commander-in-chief of the Kronstadt naval base, Admiral Wiren held a meeting with other officers of the Baltic Fleet to discuss the unrest which was taking place in Petrograd. During this meeting, most of the officers expressed doubt about the reliability of the sailors to put down the unrest, as it was clear that the sailors would support the revolution.

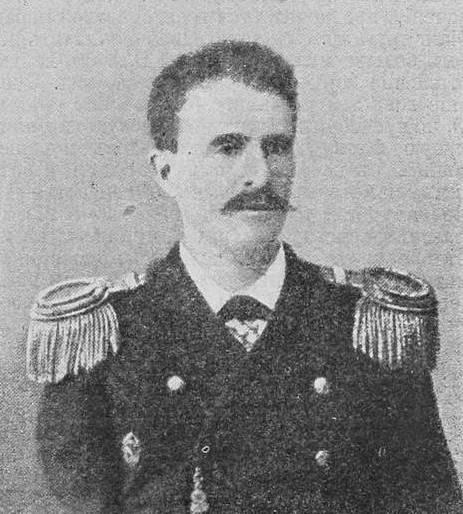
Admiral Wiren was known for his brutality among the sailors of Kronstadt

During the night of 28 February, sailors from the 1st Baltic Fleet Depot came onto the streets and were soon joined by soldiers and sailors from other units.

=== Massacre of officers ===
In the recollection of events given by Bolshevik revolutionary Fyodor Raskolnikov, during the early hours of 1 March a crowd of sailors had gathered outside Admiral Wiren's house and demanded that he come outside. Upon coming outside, Wiren shouted "attention!", which the sailors responded to with laughter. Furthermore, one sailor tore off Wiren's epaulettes. As he was being taken to Anchor Square, Wiren allegedly began confessing his excesses against the sailors and begged them to spare his life before he was shot dead.

Approximately 40 naval and army officers were killed over the course of the uprising, and about 200 others were imprisoned by the mutineers. Raskolnikov claimed that officers who had displayed brutality towards the sailors in the past had been singled out for execution, whereas humane officers were unharmed, stating:

No less well-known throughout Kronstadt, and even far beyond it, as a harsh and inhuman officer, was the commander of the 1st Baltic Fleet Depot, Colonel Stronsky. It was against Wiren and Stronsky first and foremost that the anger of the revolutionary crowd was directed. Their fate was shared by the myrmidons of these satraps of the old regime who, adapting themselves to the course followed by the state, had implemented a policy of stick and knout.

== Portrayals in media ==
- The massacre of naval officers in Kronstadt is portrayed in the film Admiral (2008).
