= Anglo-Russians =

The Anglo-Russians were an English expatriate business community centred in St Petersburg, then also Moscow, from the 1730s until the 1920s. This community was established against the background of Peter I's recruitment of foreign engineers for his new capital, and generally cooperative diplomatic relations between the Russian and British empires. Some of the families were resident in Russia for several generations, though generally retaining UK citizenship and sending their children to be educated in England. Some lived there for so long that their English acquired a distinctive accent peculiar to Anglo-Russians.

== Russian people of English descent ==
Notable Anglo-Russian families were built around the trading houses and businesses of the Cazalet family; this includes the Cazalet-Miller business empire including the Ebsworth family, and Whishaw family. One of the first Anglo-Russian families was established by Noah Cazalet (1757–1800), a silk weaver, settled in St Petersburg and expanded into the burgeoning business of rope manufacture for sailing ships. In 1860, Edward Cazalet married an Elizabeth Marshall, and became connected to the company of William Miller & Co, of Leith in Scotland. The Whishaw family, of Hills and Whishaw Ltd, included James Whishaw, and influential intermediary in development of the Baku oilfields and Stella Zoe Whishaw, later Baroness Meyendorff, an Anglo-Russian actress who wrote a memoir Through terror to freedom - the dramatic story of an Englishwoman's life and adventures in Russia before, during & after the revolution in 1929, and then became a film diva in the 1930s.

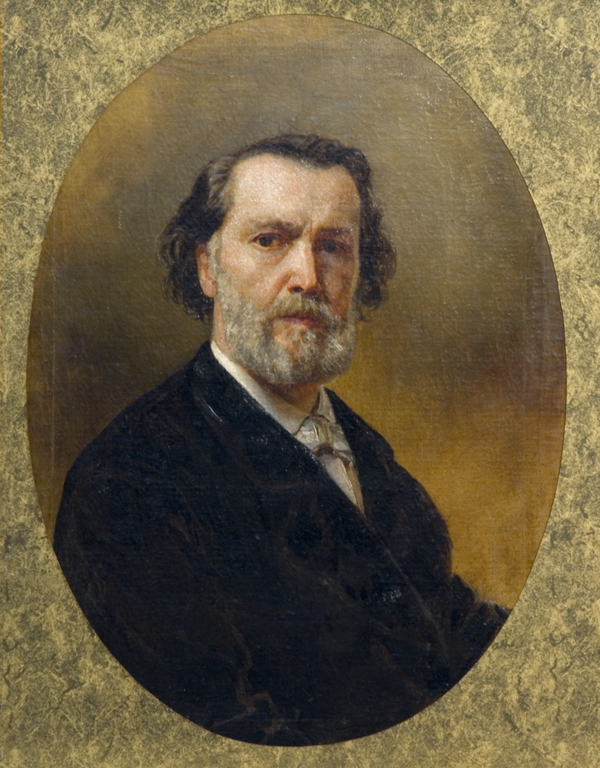
Vladimir Sherwood, a painter and architect of English descent

Nothing is recorded of the children of Joseph Billings (c.1758-1806) an English navigator who joined the Tsar's navy and settled in Russia. More notable are the descendants of William Sherwood, an English cotton machine engineer who came to Russia in 1800. (1798 at the invitation of Tsar Paul I according to family papers (Marcus Sherwood-Jenkins). His sons were John Sherwood, (Ivan Shervud in Russian) an influential lieutenant to Alexander I and Joseph Sherwood, who died in 1832 when his son Vladimir Osipovich Sherwood, later a famous architect (who was responsible for the building of The State Historical Museum on Red Square, Moscow) was five years old. William's descendants include great-grandsons Vladimir Vladimirovich Sherwood, also an architect, and Leonid Sherwood, a sculptor, and great-great-grandson, the artist Vladimir Favorsky. John Sherwood (Ivan Shervud) was responsible for unmasking the Decemberist plot in 1825 and was ennobled by the Tsar for his services and given the honorific Shervud Vernyi (Sherwood the loyal).

In addition, there were the expatriate-born children of British businessmen in Russia, such as conductor Albert Coates, whose father was general manager for a British company in St Petersburg. He was raised from the age of 12 in England. Chess playing sisters Vera Menchik and Olga Menchik were daughters of a Czech father and English mother in Moscow, who moved to Britain in 1921 when the sisters were 15 and 13 years old.

A fictional account of Anglo-Russians is found in Penelope Fitzgerald's The Beginning of Spring (London, 1988).

== See also ==
- Russians in the United Kingdom
- Scottish Russians
- Irish Russians
- Anglo-Russian Convention
- Anglo-Russian invasion of Holland
- Anglo-Russian occupation of Naples
- Anglo-Russian action in Persia
