= Vladimir Lebedev (artist) =

Russian painter

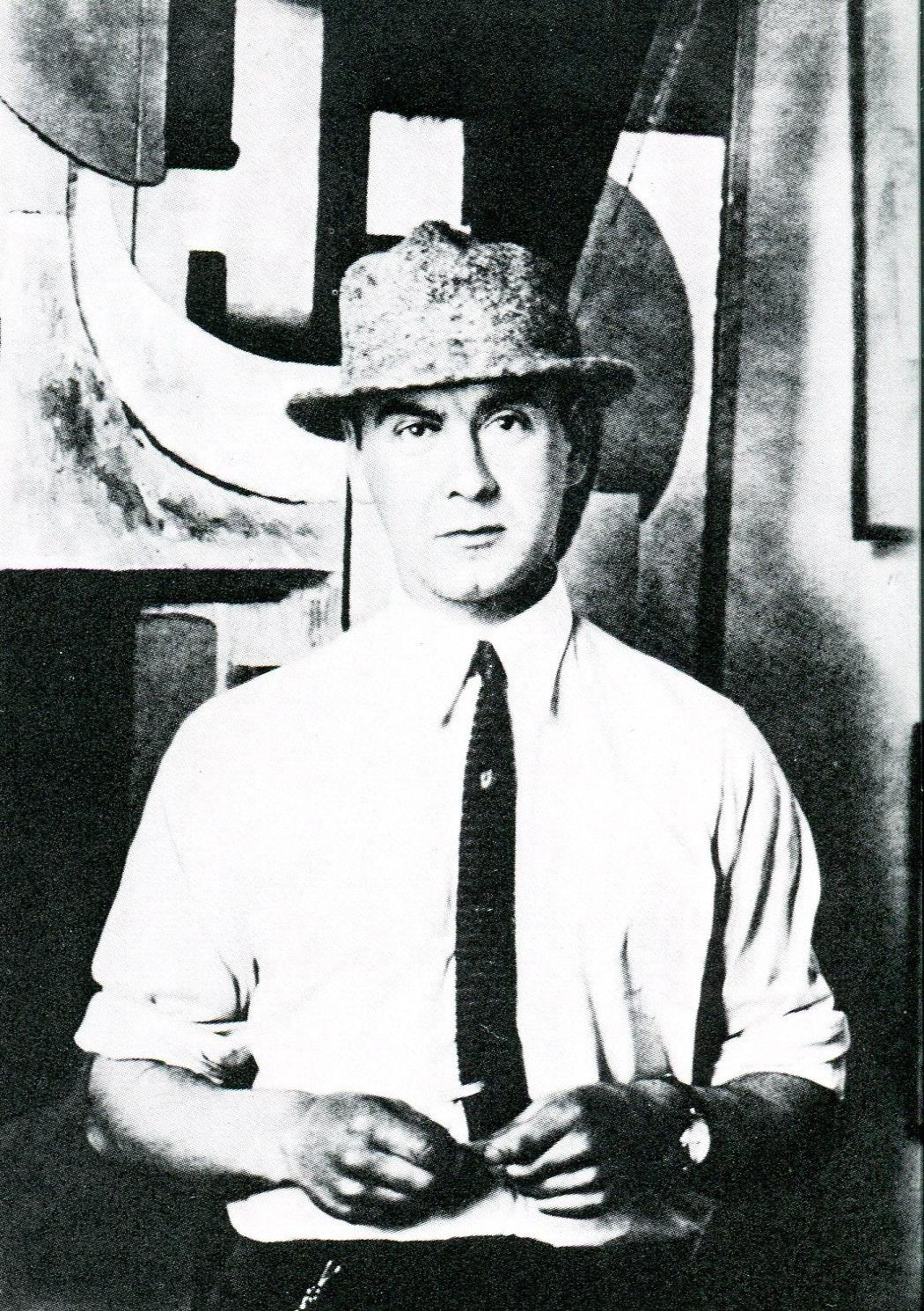
- Photo of artist Vladimir Lebedev, ca. 1920s.
- Born: 14 (26) May 1891; Saint Petersburg
- Died: 21 November 1967; Leningrad
- Education: St. Petersburg Academy of Fine Arts: Alexander Titov, Franz Rubo and Leonid Sherwood; the private studio of Mikhail Bernshtein
- Known for: Children's books illustrator, painter, cartoonist
- Style: Avant garde, Cubist
- Movement: Constructivist, Productivist
- Spouse(s): Sculptor Sarra Lebedeva; ballerina and choreographer Nadezhda Nadezhdina; writer Ada Lazlo

Vladimir Vasilyevich Lebedev (Russian: Влади́мир Васи́льевич Ле́бедев; 26 May 1891 – 21 November 1967) was part of the Russian avant-garde: A painter, a political cartoonist and a poster artist, with an experimental style influenced by Russian folk art, lubki, futurism, constructivism, suprematism, productionism and cubism. A pioneer in the field of children's illustration, he would later acknowledge his role in inventing a new illustrative style, created in the "language of cubism."

Lebedev's most important contributions to children's literature were made in the 1920s, and some of his most ground-breaking work was created in collaboration with the poet Samuil Marshak, whom Maxim Gorky called "the founder of Russia's (Soviet) children's literature." Together, they published more than a dozen picture books, on topics both fanciful: Tale About a Foolish Mouse and instructive: How a Plane Made a Plane. Raduga ("The Rainbow"), a renowned Soviet publishing house published most of them. Founded in 1922 by Lev Kliachko, it was shut down by the government in 1930." He was one of the members of the art association ‘The Four Arts’, which existed in Moscow and Leningrad in 1924-1931.

The demise of Raduga coincided with the state's push toward social realism, which forced Lebedev toward a more naturalistic style. By then, however, his reputation was already made. Nowadays, he is still classified as one of the most important Russian and Soviet children's book illustrators. His collaboration with Marshak is also considered among the most innovative in the history of children's literature.

== Career ==
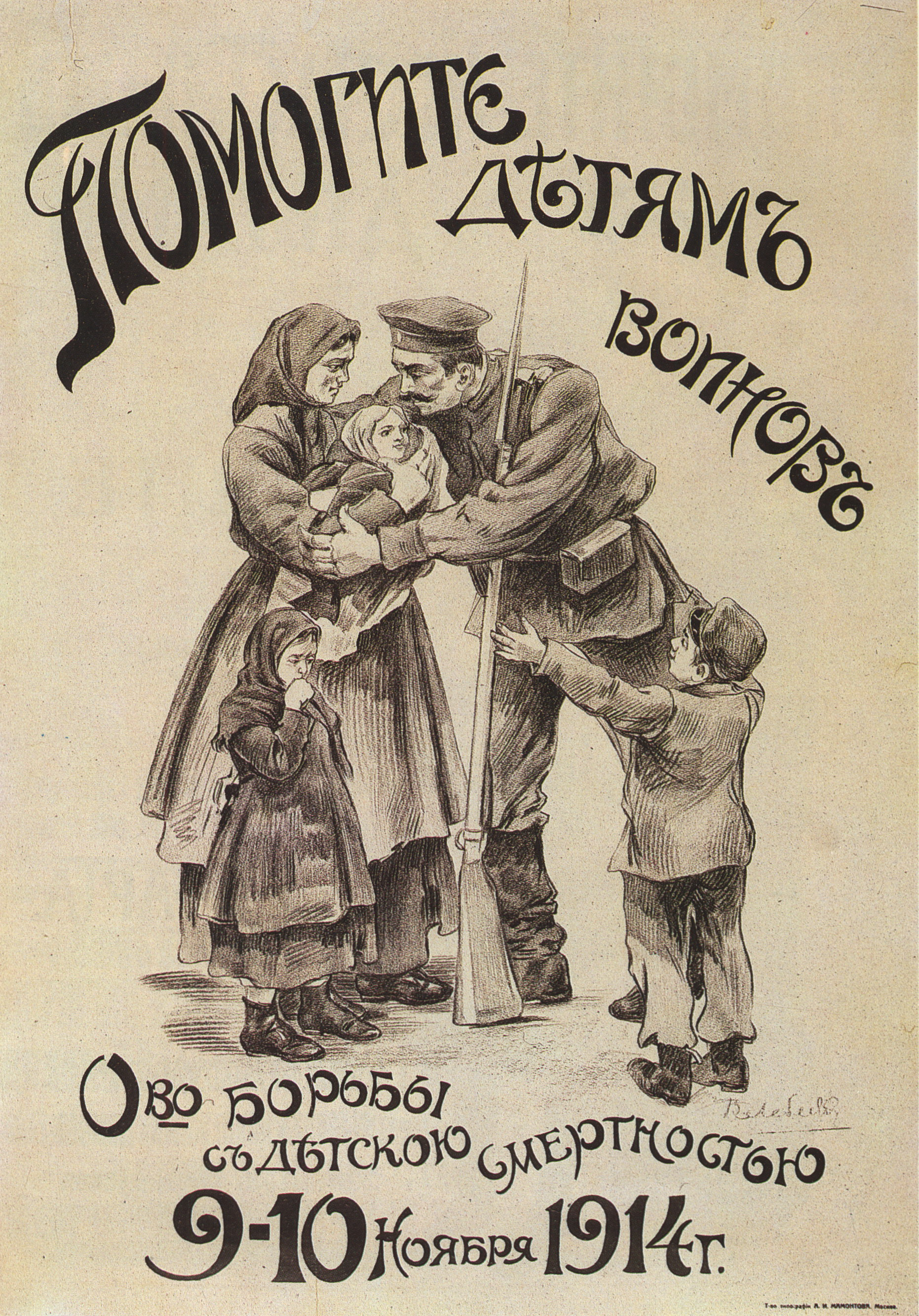
An example of one of Lebedev's early naturalistic propaganda poster of a soldier from the Workers' and Peasants' Red Army embracing peasants in 1914.

Lebedev began his career at age 14, painting postcards sold in a shop in Saint Petersburg. His first exhibit at the Academy of Fine Arts was held five years later.

In 1913, he began working as a political cartoonist for several satirical journals, including the famed Satirikon (Сатирикон). By then, he was already a prolific illustrator for the children's magazines Jackdaw (Галчонок), Blue Journal (Синий Журнал), Everyone's Journal (Журнал для всех), and Argus (Аргус) and, in 1917, he had also illustrated the children's book The Lion and the Bull.

From 1920-1922, only a few years after the Revolution, Lebedev was hired to create more than 500 posters, or placards, for the Russian Telegraph Agency (ROSTA) and the Department for Agitation and Propaganda (Agitprop). The goal in both cases was to promote the solidarity of the working class. Since both newspapers and literacy were limited, the posters were strategically displayed in empty shop windows — known as ROSTA windows — which functioned as a crude form of mass communications. Lebedev's posters were notable for their stark, simplified imagery: a single figure, in bold color, built from spare geometric forms, and engaged in varying kinds of labor.

In the 1910s and 1920s, he kept company with many of the most influential figures in the radical Soviet avant-garde art movement, among them constructivist Vladimir Tatlin, cubo-futurist Ivan Puni, suprematist Kazimir Malevich, futurist Vladimir Mayakovsky and acmeist and formalist literary critic Nikolay Punin. In the mid-1920s, he partnered with poet Samuil Marshak to create both picture books and politically conscious "production books." The latter form, unique to the Soviet Union, told stories that taught children about "the world of workers and how things are made" Their titles included: Circus, Ice Cream, Tale About a Foolish Mouse, Moustached and Striped, Book of Many Colours, Twelve Months and Luggage, as well as The Table, How a Plane Made a Plane, Bread, My Little Book about the Seas and the Lighthouse, the Mail, and On the River.

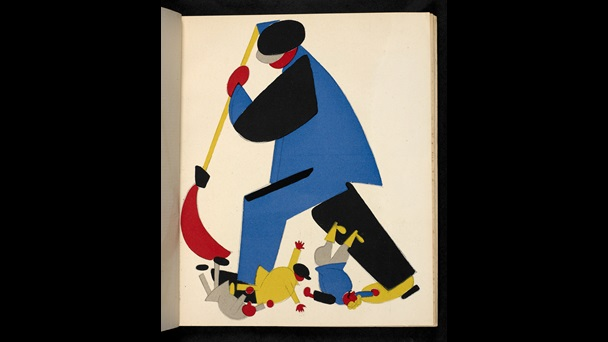
A book illustration reprinting Lebedev's propaganda poster, rendered in his more characteristic style, for "Violence: A Worker Sweeping the Criminals from the Soviet Land," 1923.

The books were well received. Nikolai Punin, who wrote the first monograph on Lebedev, considered him one of the most important illustrators of the era:

After his brilliant experiments with "Circus" and "Ice Cream" ... bookstores burst into color with numerous imitations of his examples, and book illustrations in the receding cultural tradition—all the 'World of Art' illustrations—paled in comparison ... in terms of form, [they] began to seem impotent, overly concerned with aesthetics, and unexpressive.

By the late 1920s and 30s, most of Lebedev's peers had left the Soviet Union, but he remained. As social realism began to dominate arts and letters, and "acquir[ed] the status of state policy in 1934," Lebedev was among the artists who "became victims of frequent attacks." The book Inside the Rainbow - Russian Children's Literature 1920-35: Beautiful Books, Terrible Times published by Pegasus, in Holland, details threats made by Soviet authorities against Lebedev. The book was the subject of reviews in The Guardian and The Financial Times, among other publications. Forced to accommodate Stalinist art diktats, Lebedev's professional experiments ceased. In the late 1940s, his work turned to the naturalistic depiction of “healthy” Soviet children and animals.

== Personal life ==
Lebedev was married three times. His first wife Sarra Lebedeva (Darmolatova) was a sculptor. His second wife was ballerina and choreographer Nadezhda Nadezhdina, whose portrait Lebedev painted several times. His third marriage was to writer Ada Lazlo in 1940.

== Collections ==
- The Art Institute of Chicago: 1940s war propaganda
- Dartmouth Digital Library: Russian Placards, 1917-1922
- Getty Research: Union List of Artists Names
- Library of Congress: 1920s Soviet Production illustrations
- McGill University: Children's book illustration
- Museum of Modern Art (MOMA): Children's book illustration
- Miami University: Walter Havighurst Special Collections & University Archives: Children's books
- University of Washington Libraries: Children's books and Soviet Production books
