= Plevna Chapel =

Russo-Turkish War memorial in Moscow

Coordinates: 55.7567°N 37.6312°E

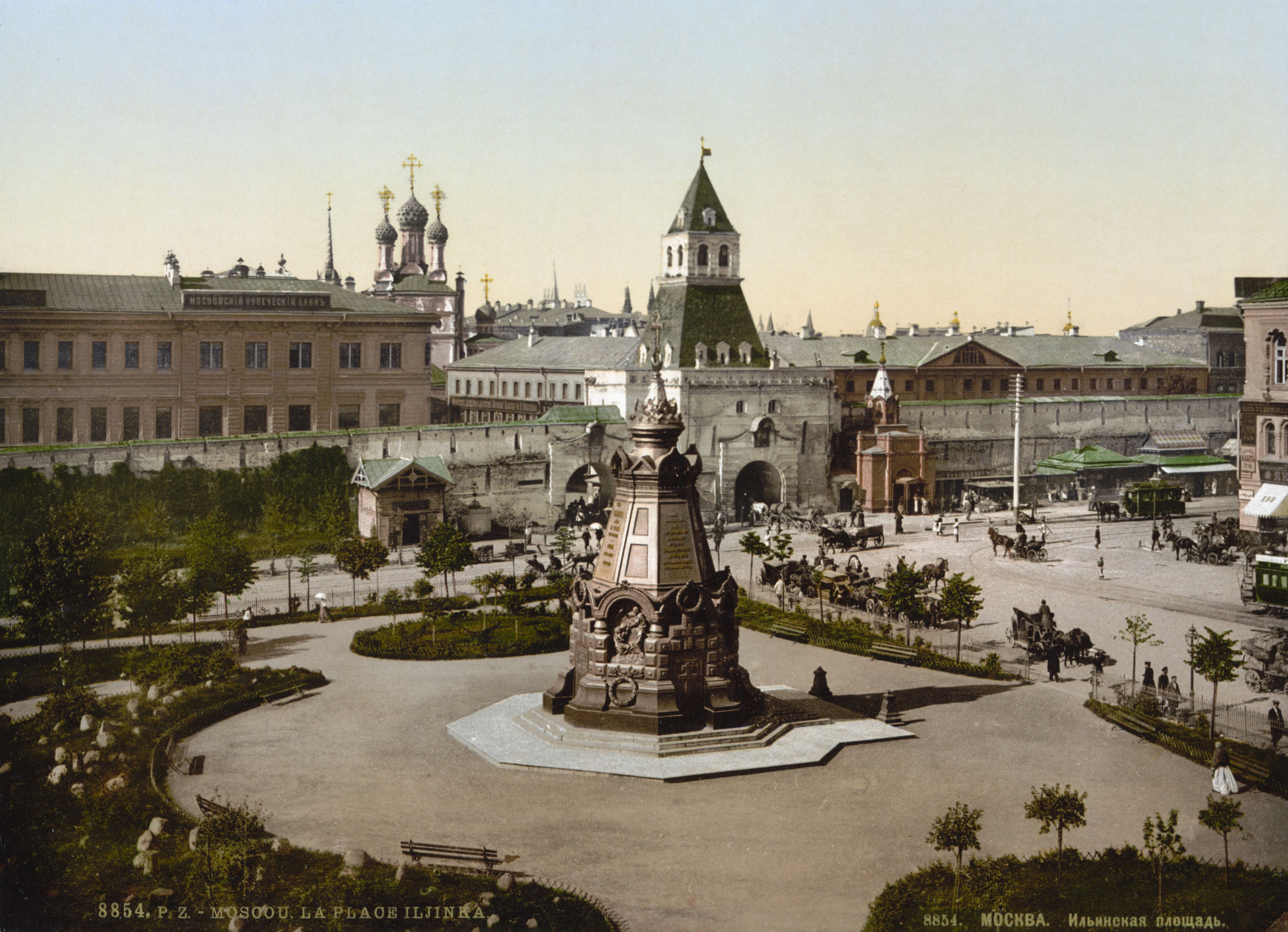
The chapel on a 19th-century photochrom postcard

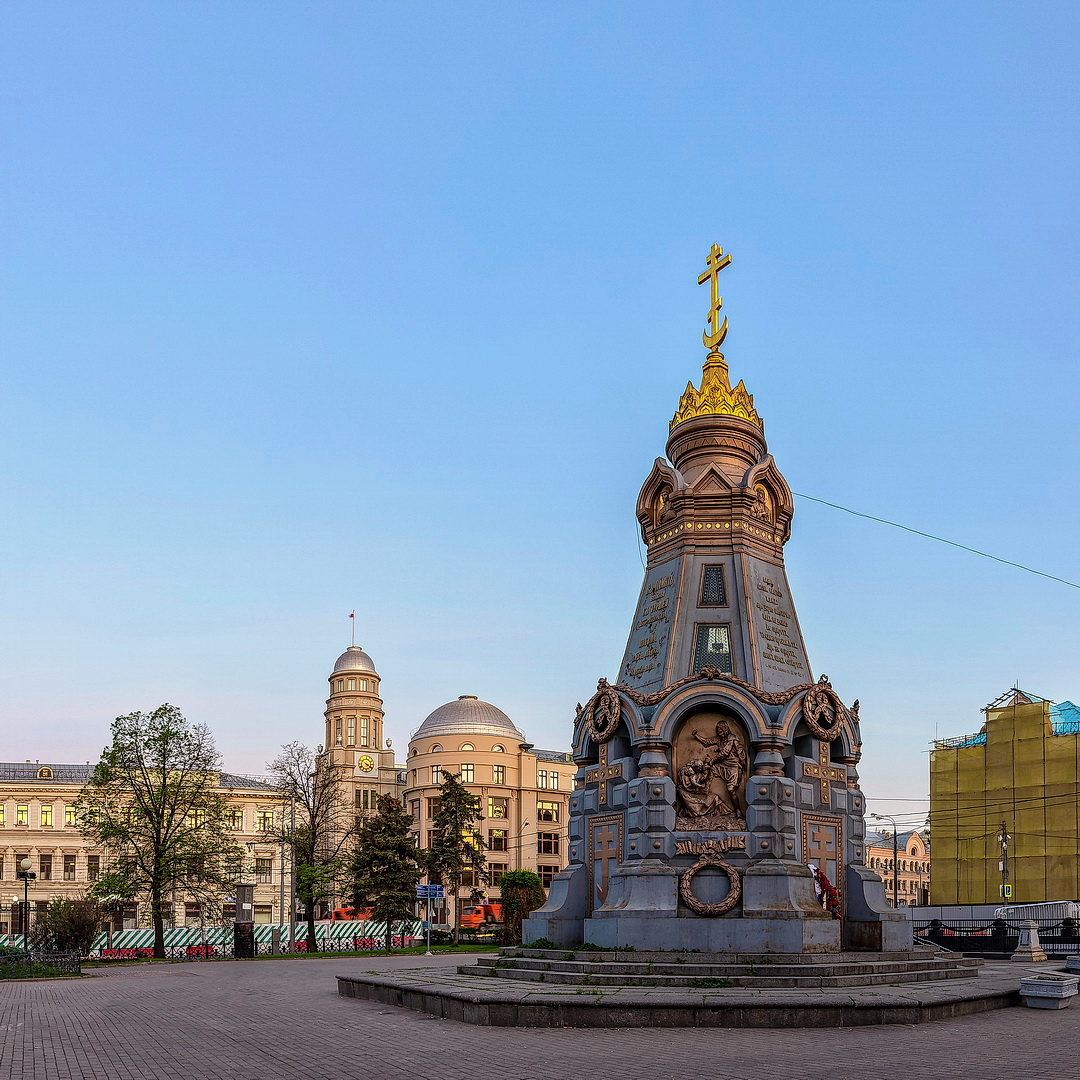
The chapel in 2017

The Plevna Chapel (in Russian Памятник героям Плевны, Pamyatnik geroyam Plevny, The Monument to Plevna heroes) is a public subscription monument to the Russian Grenadiers who died during the Siege of Plevna. It was opened on a square outside the Ilyinka Gate of the Walled City in Moscow on the 10th anniversary of the taking of Pleven (1887), in the presence of Field Marshal Nikolai Nikolayevich. The monument was designed by Vladimir Sherwood. Each side is decorated with a high relief plaque illustrating the exploits of the Grenadiers. The interior, now empty, once housed a set of bronze plaques listing 18 Grenadier officers and 542 soldiers who died at Plevna. An annual memorial service is held in front of the chapel on March 3 (the day of Bulgaria's liberation). In the Perestroika years, the surrounding park used to be notorious as a gay cruising ground.

== Artistic features ==
The cast-iron octagonal tent-chapel on a low pedestal is crowned with the orthodox cross.

The sides of the monument are adorned with four high reliefs: a Russian old peasant who is blessing a grenadier's son; a Turkish infantryman with a dagger, snatching a baby out of its Bulgarian mother's hands; a grenadier taking a Turkish soldier prisoner; a dying Russian warrior tearing a chain from a woman personifying Bulgaria. On the sides of the tent are the following inscriptions: on the northern side – "The Grenadiers to their fellows, fallen in the glorious battle of Plevna on November 28, 1877"; on the southern side – "In memory of the war with Turkey in 1877–1878" and a list of the main battles – "Plevna, Kars, Aladzha, Hadji Valy"; on the eastern and western sides – quotations from the Gospel. In front of the monument, there are cast-iron pedestals with inscriptions "In favour of the crippled grenadiers and their families" (donation cups were placed on them).

In the interior of the chapel, decorated with polychrome tiles, were pictorial images of Alexander Nevsky, John the Warrior, Nicholas the Wonderworker, Cyril and Methodius, seven bronze plates with the names of fallen grenadiers (killed or died from wounds) – 18 officers and 542 soldiers.
