= 1906 Kronstadt Mutiny =

1906 naval mutiny at Kronstadt

During the night of 19 July [O.S.] 1906, a mutiny occurred among the sailors stationed at Kronstadt naval base, in the aftermath of Tsar Nicholas II's dissolution of the First Duma earlier that month. The mutiny was put down by the next day, as the mutineers lacked sufficient weaponry and the refusal of a key infantry regiment to participate in the uprising.

== Background ==
=== United Committee of the Kronstadt Military–Revolutionary Organisation ===
In response to the disorganised nature of the earlier 1905 mutiny, activists from the Socialist Revolutionary (SR) and Bolshevik parties decided to form a secret committee to coordinate any future uprisings among the sailors of Kronstadt. The committee was named the United Committee of the Kronstadt Military–Revolutionary Organisation, and was dominated by the Socialist Revolutionaries.

=== Discussion on officer's fate ===
In the days leading up to the mutiny, the United Committee held a meeting to discuss how officers should be handled during the course of the mutiny. There was disagreement between the sailors and the SR activists on this question, as the SR activists believed that it would be sufficient to simply detain all the officers, while the sailors insisted on killing them. During this meeting, the officers were discussed one by one, and the sailors found none of the officers worthy of any mercy. One sailor later recalled that 'precious hours were wasted' on the question of the officers' fates. Eventually, a compromise was reached to deal with officers depending on the circumstances which arise.

== Uprising ==
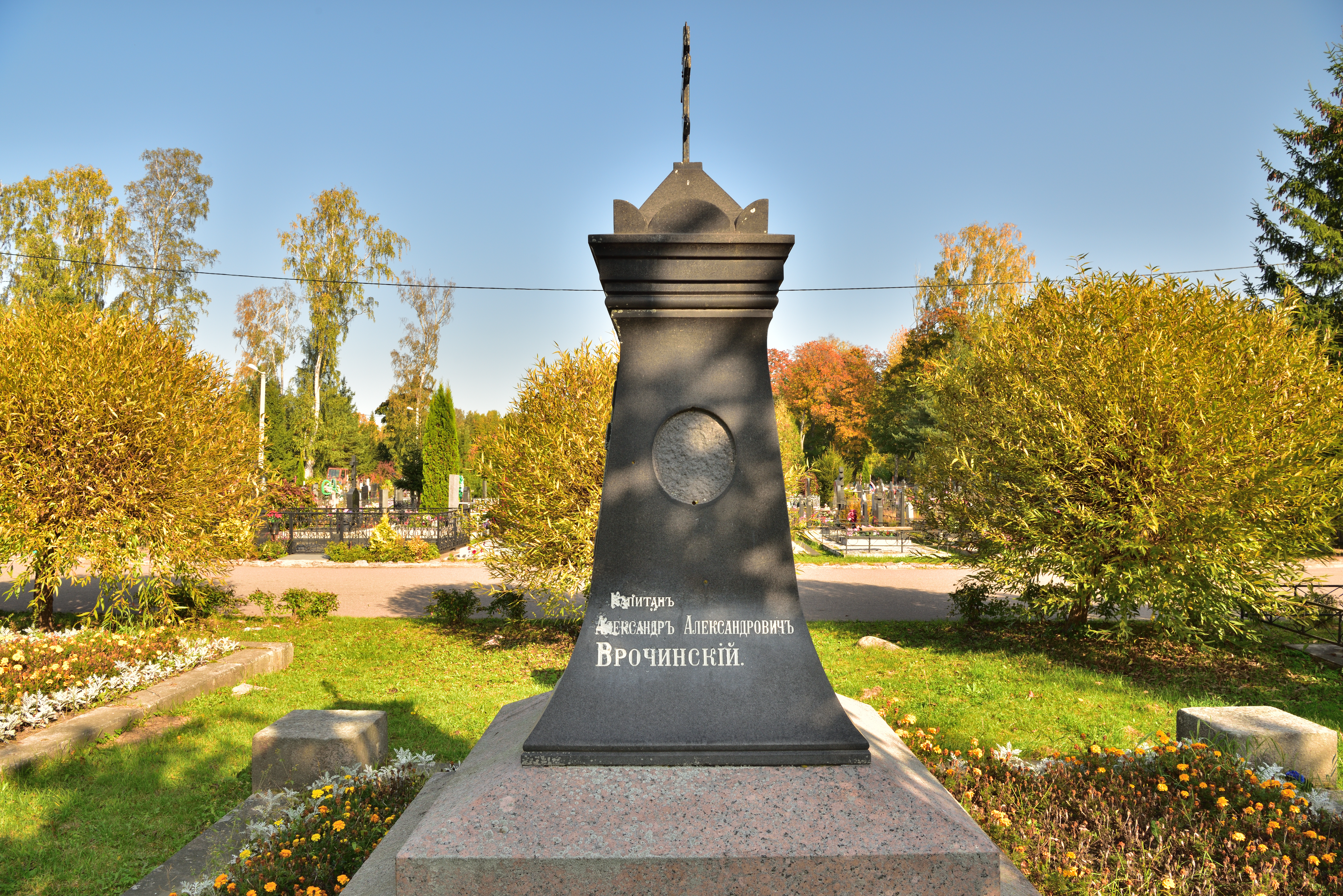
Grave of Captain Vrochinsky and Colonel Alexandrov at Kronstadt

The uprising began at 11 p.m. on 19 July and was put down by the next morning due to a lack of sufficient weaponry among the sailors, who were expecting the Eniseisk Infantry Regiment to join them and provide rifles to the mutineers. However, when the sailors urged the infantry regiment to join the uprising, the troops responded by opening fire on the mutineers, effectively putting an end to the mutiny by the morning of 20 July.

Over the course of the mutiny, four officers were killed, including Captain Vrochinsky and Colonel Alexandrov. In addition, four sailors and one civilian were killed.

== Aftermath ==
After the mutiny was put down, hundreds of sailors were imprisoned and 36 ring leaders were executed, including seven torpedo-men who were accused of the murder of Captain Vrochinsky and Colonel Alexandrov. These torpedo-men were executed on 20 July, and were forced to dig their own graves by Vice-Admiral A. Adlerberg, who mocked the mutineers demands for land and liberty, stating:

Dig lads, dig, here's your "Land" for you! As for your "Liberty", you'll find that in heaven!
