= Sarra Lebedeva =

Russian artist (1892-1967)

- Born: December 11, 1892
- Died: March 7, 1967 (aged 74)
- Resting place: Novodevichy Cemetery
- Education: School of the Society of for the Encouragement of the Arts
- Known for: Sculptor
- Style: Impressionism
- Spouse: Vladimir Lebedev

Sarra Dmitrievna Lebedeva (Russian: Сарра Дмитриевна Лебедева; December 11 (23), 1892 – March 7, 1967) was a Soviet sculptor, mainly of portraits, but also of statuettes, figures for porcelain and delft ware.

== Life ==
Born Sara Darmolatova into a wealthy Saint Petersburg family, Her elder sister was the writer and socialite Anna Radlova. Lebedeva was educated privately in her youth. She studied for a time at the School of the Society of for the Encouragement of the Arts in her native city before entering Mikhail Bernshtein's school in 1910; she became a sculptor two years later, studying with Leonid Sherwood from 1912 until 1914. During this time she also travelled to France, Germany, Austria and Italy, travels which introduced her to the work of the artists of the Italian Renaissance, of whom Donatello was to become a favorite. In 1914 she designed masks and reliefs for the Yusupov Palace while working with the sculptor Vasili Kuznetsov as a pupil and, later, assistant. After this she transitioned mainly to portrait and figure work. In 1915 she married the painter and graphic artist Vladimir Lebedev.

After the Russian Revolution Lebedeva took a position teaching at the Free Art Studios in Petrograd from 1918 to 1920; there she became acquainted with Vladimir Tatlin, Kazimir Malevich, and Nathan Altman, among other artists. She also entered into the local artistic milieu, becoming acquainted with intellectuals such as Maxim Gorky, Alexander Blok, Vladimir Mayakovsky, and Vsevolod Meyerkhold. She designed propaganda, producing a model for a silver ruble coin featuring an anvil and tools in 1918 and producing monuments to Georges Danton, Maximilien de Robespierre, and Alexander Herzen. From 1919 to 1920 she taught at the Stieglitz Institute in Petrograd, and in the 1920s began working in ceramics as well as producing designs for the theater. She moved to Moscow, and in 1925 she visited London. Her career as a portrait sculptor began in earnest in the same year with a portrait bust of Felix Dzerzhinsky. In 1928 she visited Paris and Berlin, and exhibited at the Venice Biennale, showing work at the latter again in 1932. In 1934 she began producing ceramic ware for the Konakovsky Factory, near which she lived, continuing until 1936; she also continued to produce portrait busts, including of Vera Mukhina, Aleksandr Tvardovsky, Aaron Soltz, Leonid Krasin, Vsevolod Ivanov, and Alexander Tsyurupa, among others. Her portrait of the pilot Valery Chkalov in the Tretyakov Gallery is “an extremely characteristic work, displaying “energetic moulding…that makes it living and dynamic.” She also produced portrait sculptures of industrial workers. A handful of figure sculptures exist as well; Lebedeva also executed designs for three monuments, none of which were ever realized.

In 1920 Lebedeva became a member of the Society of Russian Sculptors, exhibiting with them in that year, in 1929, and again in 1931. She was the subject of a personal exhibition at the State Museum of New Western Art in Moscow in 1941; in 1945 she became an Honored Artist of the RSFSR, and in 1958 she was made a Corresponding Member of the Academy of Arts of the USSR. She continued exhibiting in Moscow and Leningrad, becoming a close friend of Tatlin's and donating a large collection of his papers and artwork to the Central State Archive of Art and Literature in the 1960s. She died in Moscow; memorial exhibits were held at the Tretyakov Gallery and at the State Russian Museum. She is buried at the Novodevichy Cemetery in Moscow.

Besides Donatello, Cranach and Rembrandt were among early influences on Lebedeva's work, and pieces from her youth suggest that at the time she had no awareness of trends in the world of modern art. Another early interest was impressionism, traces of which continue to be seen in pieces which she produced throughout her career. Her future husband introduced her to the work of Pablo Picasso, Georges Braque, and Henri Matisse, whose art would go on to influence her a great deal. She preferred to craft using only the tips of her fingers rather than her entire hand to model. Her preferred medium was bronze.

A statue of Seraphim Znamensky by Lebedeva is held by the Russian Museum, as are numerous other works; she is also well-represented in the collection of the State Tretyakov Gallery. She was also responsible for the profile image of Boris Pasternak, a lifelong friend, which graces his grave marker at Peredelkino.

Lebedeva is the namesake of a crater on Venus.
