= Vladimir Osipovich Sherwood =

Russian painter and architect (1832–1897)

- Владимир Осипович Шервуд
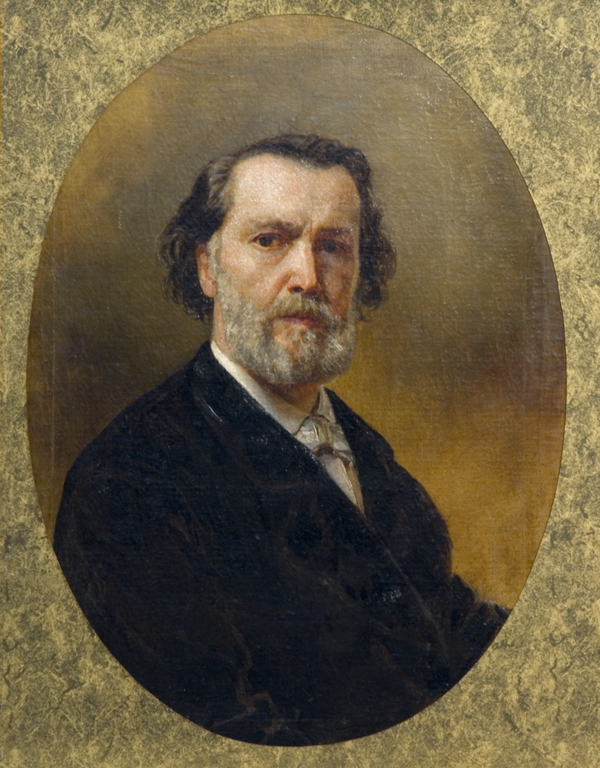
- Self-Portrait, 1876, oil on canvas; State Historical Museum, Moscow
- Born: August 18, 1832; Istleyevo, Tambov Governorate, Russian Empire
- Died: July 27, 1897 (aged 64); Moscow, Moscow Governorate, Russian Empire
- Resting place: Donskoy Monastery, Moscow
- Education: Member Academy of Arts (1872)
- Alma mater: Moscow School of Painting
- Known for: Painting, architecture
- Notable work: Historical Museum Building, 1875–1883
- Spouse: Lidiya Schumacher (m. 1856)
- Children: ten, including Leonid Sherwood
- Relatives: Vladimir Favorsky (maternal grandson)

Vladimir Osipovich Sherwood (Russian: Влади́мир О́сипович Ше́рвуд; August 30, 1832 – July 27, 1897) was a Russian painter and architect who worked in Moscow. He was an Eclectics and Russian Revival practitioner, architect of the State Historical Museum on the Red Square in Moscow.

== Biography ==
He was the son of Joseph Sherwood, an Anglo-Russian engineer whose father was William Sherwood, a Roman Catholic cotton machine engineer who had come to Russia at the invitation of Tsar Paul I on October 11, 1800. Joseph died when Vladimir was five years old. His uncle John Sherwood was an influential lieutenant in Tsar Alexander I's service. In fact John Sherwood (Ivan Sherwood Verny in Russian) was responsible for reporting the Dekabrist Conspiracy in 1825, a service for which he was ennobled and given the honorific Shervud Vernyi - Sherwood the Faithful. Vladimir Osipovich became one of the most visible architects of the Alexander III version of Russian Revival, also noted for his Plevna Chapel and Nikolay Pirogov memorial in Moscow.

His statue of Alexander II erected in Samara in 1889 was in 1927 replaced by one of Lenin mounted on the same plinth.

His paintings include: 'Laying the foundation stone to the cotton exchange', 'Blackburn', 'The Preston by-election of 1862', 'Mr Healey', and 'Mrs Healey'.

He was the father of:

- Vladimir Vladimirovich Sherwood (Владимир Владимирович Шервуд, May 17, 1867 – June 18, 1930), an Art Nouveau and Neoclassical Revival architect;
- Sergei Vladimirovich Sherwood (Сергей Владимирович Шервуд, December 13, 1858 – August 29, 1899), also an architect; and
- Leonid Vladimirovich Sherwood (Леонид Владимирович Шервуд, 1871–1954), a sculptor based in Saint Petersburg, a master of socialist realism.

He was the grandfather of artist Vladimir Favorsky, the son of his daughter Olga Sherwood.

=== Work examples ===
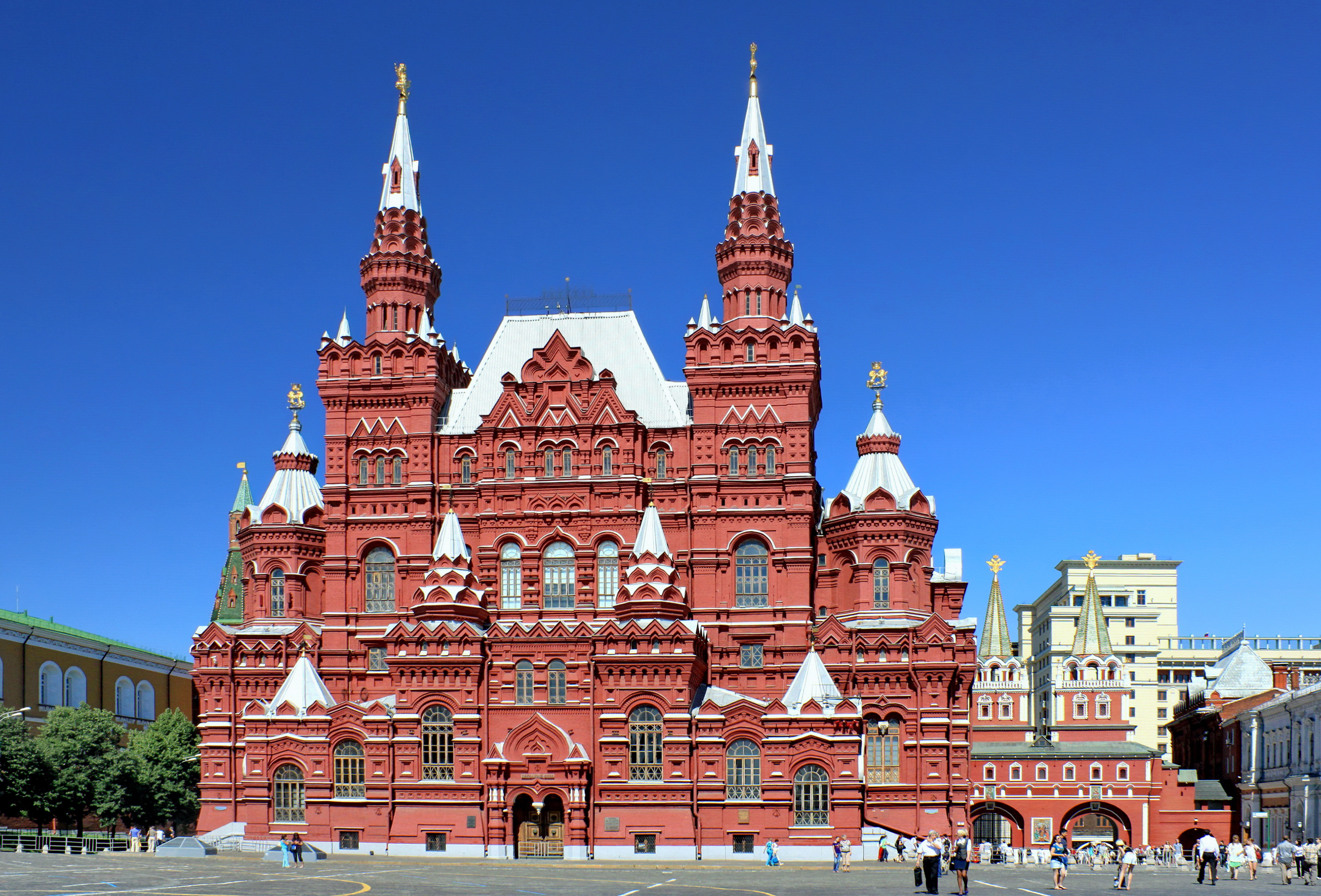
The building of the State Historical Museum (1875—1883)

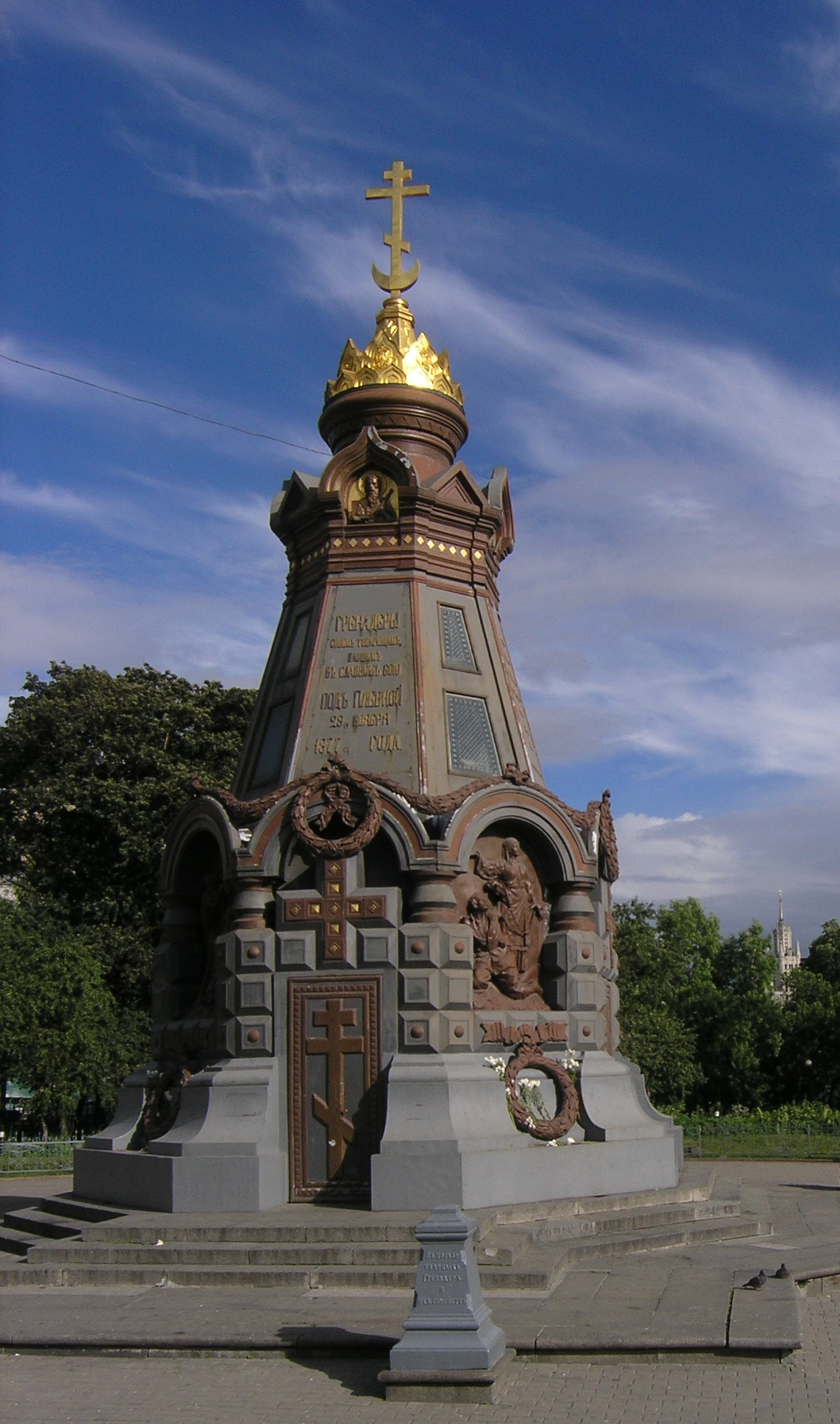
Plevna Chapel (1887)

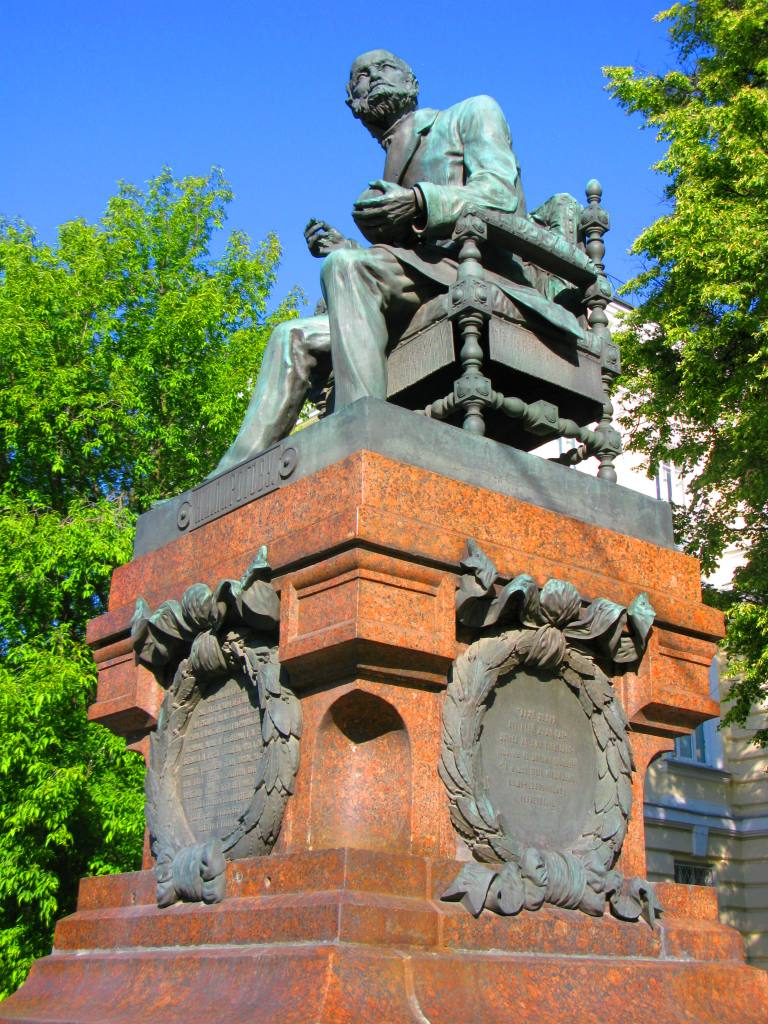
Monument to Nikolay Pirogov (1897)

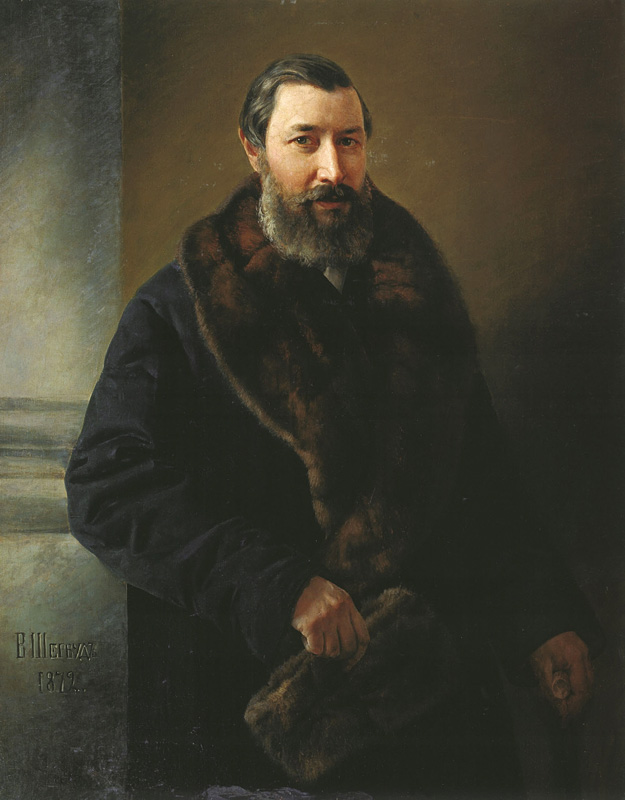
Portrait of Yuri Samarin (1872)

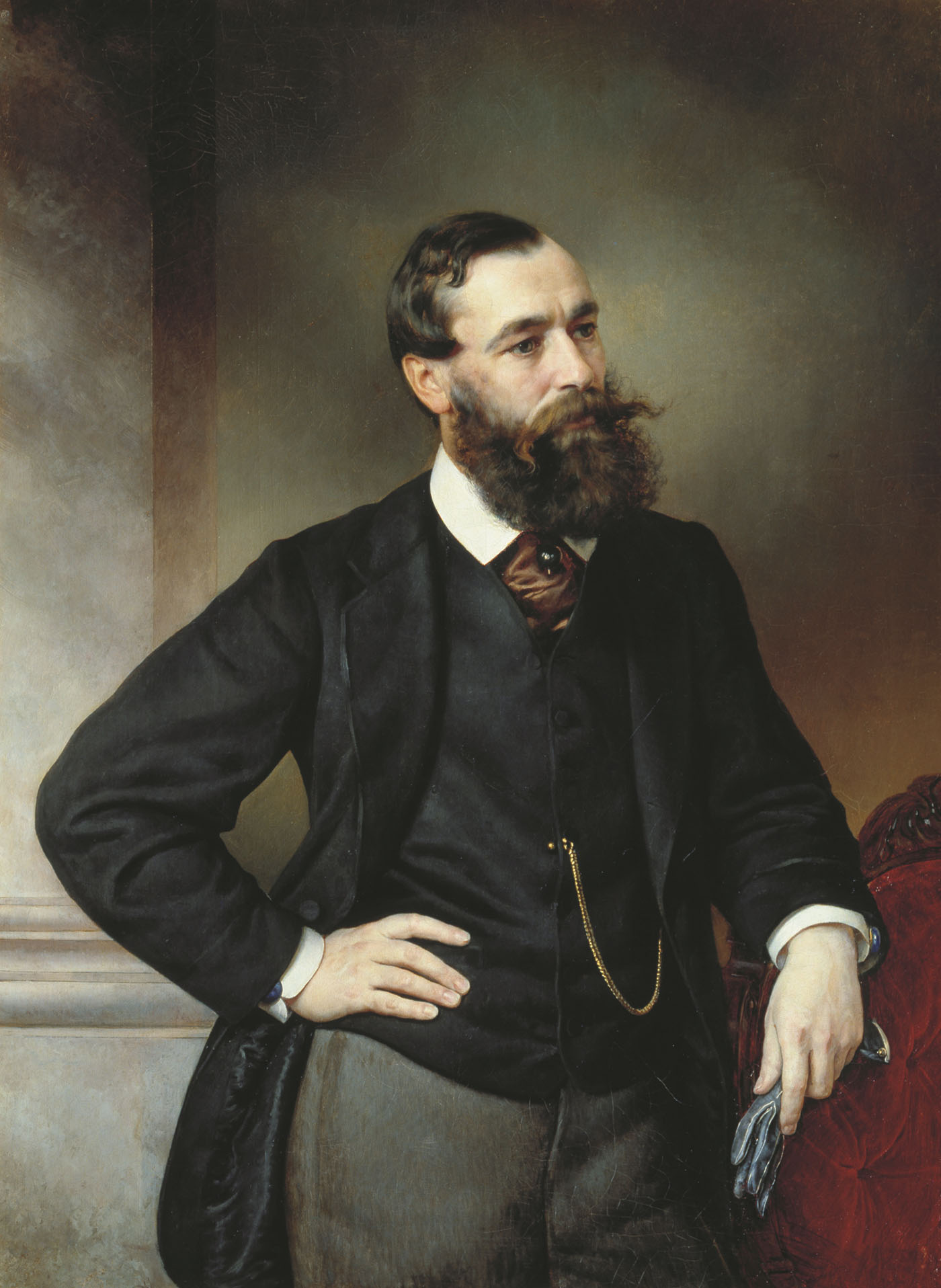
Portrait of Boris Chicherin (circa 1869)
