= Anna Radlova =

Russian and Soviet writer (1891–1949)

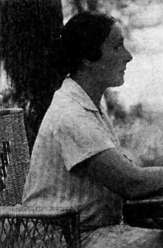
- Born: Anna Dmitrievna Darmolatova; 3 February 1891; Saint Petersburg
- Died: 23 February 1949 (aged 58); Rybinsk
- Education: Bestuzhev Courses
- Spouse: Sergei Ernestovich Radlov
- Relatives: Sarra Lebedeva (sister)

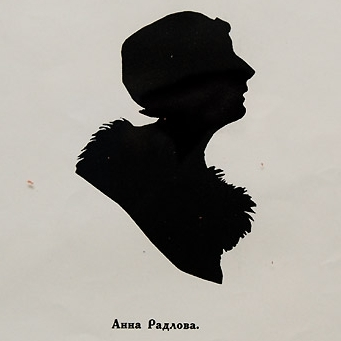
Anna Radlova by Elizaveta Kruglikova, 1922

Anna Dmitriyevna Radlova (Анна Дмитриевна Радлова) (3 February 1891 – 23 February 1949) was a Soviet salon-holder, translator of Shakespeare, and a writer. She was arrested in 1945 and died in a gulag in 1949. She was rehabilitated on 20 December 1957

== Life ==
Radlova was born in Saint Petersburg in 1891. Her younger sister Sarra Lebedeva would become a sculptor. Anna studied at the Bestuzhev Courses. She married Sergei Ernestovich Radlov in 1914. Her husband graduated from St Petersburg university in 1916. She had three volumes of poetry published in 1918, 1920 and 1922 and a play in 1923. Her work was well received and it was championed by fellow poet Mikhail Kuzmin who compared the quality of Radlova's work to the more acclaimed poet Anna Akhmatova.

She worked with her husband too. He was producing and directing Shakespearean plays and Anna was providing the translations into Russian.

Radlova was a poet in the "Petersburg School of Poetry". She was not a fan of the October Revolution and her poetry reflected this. Leon Trotsky publishes criticism of women poets and Radlova concentrated more on her translations which were the basis of her husband's repertoire. At the end of the 1930s she wrote about the "Castratos" who were an unusual Russian sect who removed their genitals to gain godliness.

During the war they ended up in Germany from North Caucasus. They were accused of treason.

She and her husband were arrested in 1945 and sent to a gulag in Rybinsk. Radlova died of a stroke in the camp on 23 February 1949. She was rehabilitated on 20 December 1957. Her original work did not appear in Russian until 1997, except for a short collection of poems published in 1991 by the editorial of the international foundation of history of science, Leningrad. Out of her translations of Shakespeare only "Richard III" has been re-published on numerous occasions.
