= Vladimir Favorsky =

Russian artist (1886-1964)

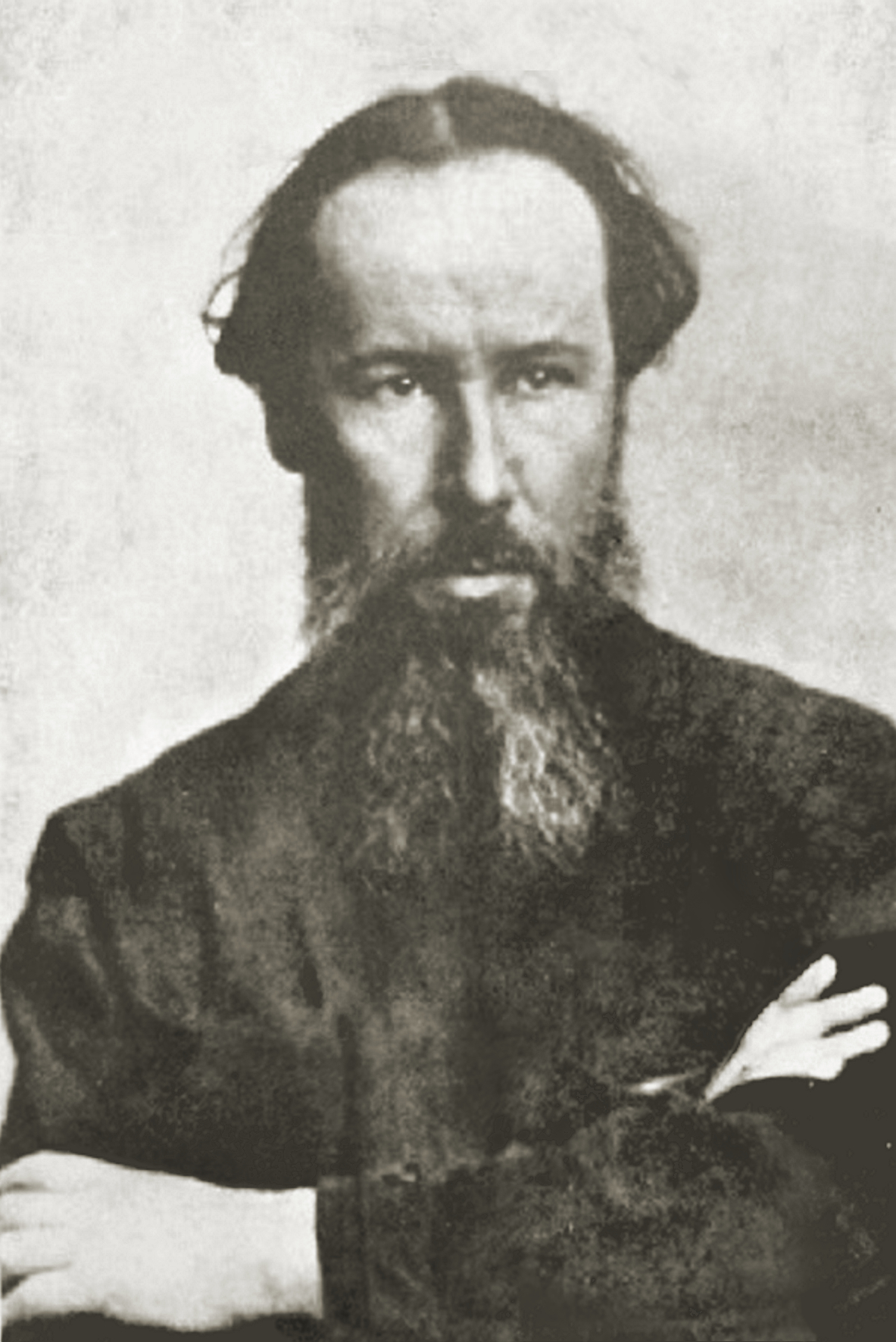
Vladimir Favorsky in the 1920s

Vladimir Andreyevich Favorsky (Russian: Владимир Андреевич Фаворский; March 14, 1886 – December 29, 1964) was a Russian draughtsman and art teacher, active in Moscow from Tsar Nicholas II's reign through Khruschev's rule, best known for his woodcut illustrations. He was a People's Artist of the USSR from 1963 and a full member of Soviet Academy of Arts from 1962, as well as of the Four Arts society.

== Background ==
Favorsky was born on March 14, 1886, in Moscow, Russian Empire. His father, Andrei Evgrafovich Favorsky (1843–1926) was a prominent lawyer and member of the Imperial Russian Duma (Parliament). Favorsky's mother, Olga Vladimirovna Sherwood, was of English-descent, being the daughter of architect Vladimir Osipovich Sherwood, and sister of Vladimir Vladimirovich Sherwood and Leonid Sherwood. The chemist Alexey Favorsky was his uncle.

Among Favorsky's scores are the artwork for The Tale of Igor's Campaign, Dante's La Vita Nuova, Shakespeare's The Twelfth Night and The Sonnets, Pushkin's Boris Godunov and Little Tragedies, 1830, and Anatole France's Les Opinions de Jérôme Coignard. He taught at the Moscow School of Painting, Sculpture and Architecture; one of his notable students was Sattar Bahlulzade.

Favorsky died on December 29, 1964, and is buried at the Novodevichy Cemetery.

== See also ==
- List of Russian artists
