= 1905 Kronstadt Mutiny =

Unrest during Russian Revolution of 1905

- Part of the Russian Revolution of 1905
Date	26–28 October 1905
Location	Kronstadt naval base, Russia 59°59′27″N 29°46′29″E
Result	Mutiny suppressed by government troops

Belligerents
Russian Empire	Mutinous sailors and soldiers of Kronstadt

Commanders and leaders
Vice-Admiral K. P. Nikonov	Unknown; poorly organized with no effective leadership

Strength
Troops brought from St. Petersburg (exact numbers unknown)	Majority of Kronstadt's 13,000 sailors and soldiers participated

Casualties and losses
Unknown	16 sailors and 1 civilian killed; ~75 sailors, 12 soldiers, 17 civilians wounded
- Arrests: 3,000; Trials: 208; Death sentences: 0
- Mutiny followed poor conditions, restrictions on sailors, and arrest of soldiers presenting demands

On 26 October 1905, a mutiny erupted among soldiers and sailors stationed at the Kronstadt naval base, following the arrest of 50 soldiers who tried to present their demands to their regiment commander. The mutineers, who were poorly organised and lacked effective leadership, engaged in arson and looting. On 28 October, troops were brought in from St. Petersburg to suppress the mutiny, which resulted in the deaths of 16 sailors and one civilian.

== Background ==
=== Working conditions ===
During the time of the mutiny, the sailors of Kronstadt were subjected to bad food, restrictions on their recreational activities, and maltreatment by officers. The sailors were forbidden from going to the recreational facilities of Kronstadt, including the town's parks, taverns, and tea-houses. Furthermore, the sailors were subjected to beatings by their officers.

=== Anchor Square meeting (23 October 1905) ===
On 17 October 1905, Tsar Nicholas II put forth the October Manifesto, which pledged to grant some civil liberties. On 23 October a crowd of approximately 5,000 sailors, soldiers, high school students, and civilians gathered in Kronstadt's Anchor Square to hear how the October Manifesto's promised liberties would affect them. During this meeting, the sailors and soldiers adopted a petition in which they made the following demands:

- Freedom of assembly
- The right to use their recreational time as they saw fit
- The right to purchase wine
- The removal of signs from the parks of Kronstadt which barred sailors and soldiers from entering
- A reduction in the seven-year term of naval service
- Better food and uniforms
- Higher wages
- The abolition of estates
- The right of ethnic minorities to be educated in their own language
- The right to speak freely to superiors

The meeting was attended by Bolshevik Party member Iosif Dubrovinsky and Socialist Revolutionary member Pavel Tolmachev, both of whom denounced Tsar Nicholas II's October Manifesto. The meeting dispersed peacefully, though some soldiers vandalised brothels and threw stones at officers.

=== Vice-Admiral Nikonov's tours (24–25 October 1905) ===
On 24 and 25 October 1905, Vice-Admiral K. P. Nikonov visited the sailors and soldiers and asked them about their 'needs and grievances'. During these tours, a sailor named A. Kotlov expressed:

"We are hurt at every step, your Highness. We are treated like beasts. Our officers never have a friendly word for us but always bark; their rudeness cuts us to the quick, for it is as if they set out deliberately to rob us of our human dignity. Some do not content themselves with merely being rude, but slap our faces and, for good measure, pile on exaggerated punishments. The sergeant-majors have been told, 'Beat those sons of bitches, harder and smartly'".

Furthermore, Kotlov informed Nikonov that some sailors had been beaten so severely by their officers that they had to be hospitalised. Upon hearing these grievances, Nikonov responded, "Don't listen to evil-minded persons who incite you to break your oath and engage in disorders." Furthermore, Nikonov ordered reinforcements from St. Petersburg, as he was alarmed by the sailors' demands and grievances.

=== Presentation of demands to Colonel Osipov (26 October 1905) ===
The next day, about fifty soldiers of the Second Kronstadt Infantry Battalion tried to present their demands and grievances to their regiment commander, Colonel Osipov. After Osipov refused to hear their demands, the soldiers began to riot, shouting, "Liberty! All are equal now! We need no officers!". These soldiers were arrested and were being taken to a railway station when they called out to a crowd of sailors, soldiers, and civilians who were looting a wine store. When the crowd tried to help them, the guards opened fire, killing a sailor.

== Mutiny ==
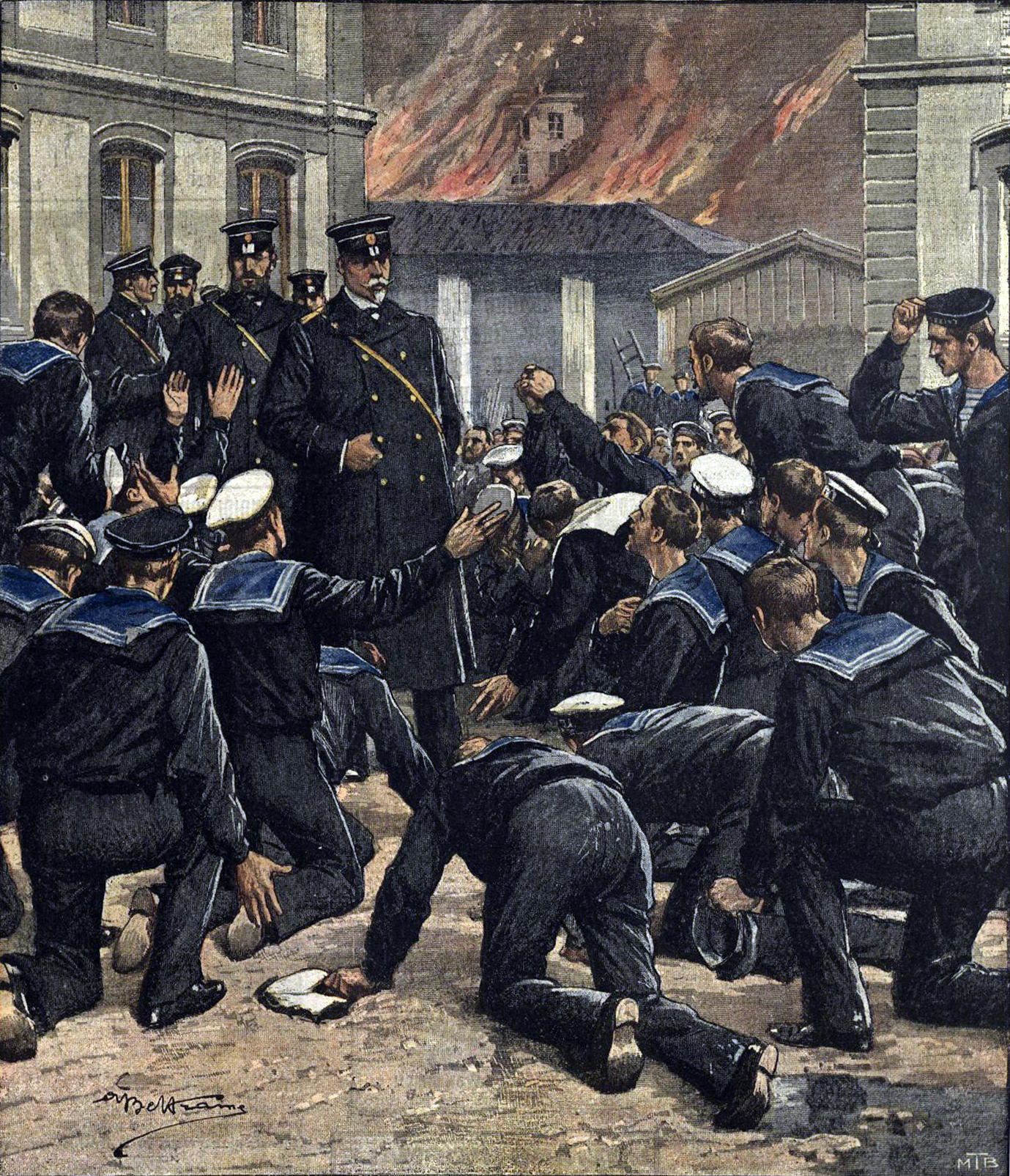
Portrayal of the aftermath of the mutiny

The sailors of Third, Fifth and Tenth Naval Depots and the gunners of the Gunnery Training Detachment armed themselves, following the shooting of the sailor by the guard. The mutineers stormed the streets and faced no resistance from the police or officers, who fled. The mutineers looted officers' homes and wine stores and set fire to buildings. A majority of Kronstadt's 13,000 sailors and soldiers participated in the mutiny.

On 28 October, the troops which Vice-Admiral Nikonov ordered from St. Petersburg arrived and suppressed the mutiny. By the end of the mutiny, 16 sailors and one civilian were killed. A further 75 sailors, 12 soldiers, and 17 civilians were wounded.

== Aftermath ==
Although the majority of Kronstadt's 13,000 sailors and soldiers participated in the mutiny, only 3,000 were arrested, and 208 were brought to trial. Among those put on trial, 84 were acquitted, and only 41 soldiers and sailors were found guilty of mutiny. None were sentenced to death, and only one person was sentenced to hard labour for life.

The lenient response to the 1905 Kronstadt Mutiny was attributed to a desire to depoliticise the soldiers and sailors of Kronstadt.
