= Ivan Sherwood Verny =

Russian Imperial Army officer of English descent

Ivan Vasiyevich Sherwood-Verny
- Иван Васильевич Шервуд-Верный
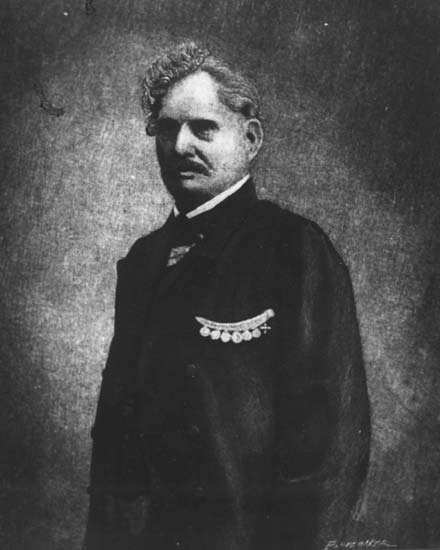
- Born: John Sherwood; 12 March 1798; Hull, Yorkshire, England
- Died: 4 November 1867 (aged 69); Saint Petersburg, Russian Empire
- Occupations: Military officer, Decembrist
- Years active: 1819-1833

Ivan Vasiyevich Sherwood-Verny (Russian: Иван Васильевич Шервуд-Верный) (born John Sherwood; 12 March 1798 – 4 (16) November 1867) was a Russian Imperial Army officer of English descent. He was known for denouncing the Dekabrist revolt and for this act was awarded the surname Shervud Verny or Sherwood the Faithful by Tsar Nicholas I.

== Early life ==
John Sherwood was born in Hull, Yorkshire, England and emigrated to Russia with his parents, engineer William Sherwood and Martha née Feltham in 1800 when his father worked at the Imperial Alexandrov factory in St Petersburg. [Note: He is often wrongly said to have been born in Greenwich or Gravesend - a confusion arising from the fact that the family resided at Greenwich prior to their departure for Russia and took ship at Gravesend). The Sherwood family were a well established Yorkshire family of farmers Cotton Mill engineers, drapers and clockmakers. The family remained in touch despite the distance of separation and John's nephew Vladimir in particular often returned to Yorkshire, Durham and Lancashire to visit his relatives, painting a number of well-known works during these visits (including Laying the Foundation stone at Blackburn Cotton exchange.) [Source: Sherwood family archives] The children were rechristened with Russian versions of their English names, thus John became Ivan and his youngest brother Joseph became Osip. Ossip Sherwood was subsequently the father of architect Vladimir Osipovich Sherwood. Ivan Sherwood was admitted to the Moscow Medical and Surgery Academy in 1815 but left after 3 months and became an English Language teacher.

== Military service ==
Sherwood joined the army initially as a private in the 3rd Ukrainian Ulan Regiment and was rapidly promoted to NCO. By the end of 1823 he became aware of the existence of a conspiracy among a large group of officers. As he later wrote: "I loved the blessed memory of the late Emperor Alexander I, not by one devotion, as to the king, but as to the emperor, who did much good to my father." Sherwood wrote a letter about the plot to Doctor Y. V. Wiley for onward transfer to Tsar Alexander I. In a letter, Sherwood reported on the plans of the conspirators. As a consequence, he was summoned to Aleksey Arakcheyev, to whom he was brought with a courier in Gruzino on 12 July 1825. The next day he was brought to St. Petersburg to see General Kleinmichel, through whom Sherwood was introduced in the Kamennoostrovsky Palace to Alexander I. Sherwood told "that he accidentally learned that in some regiments of the 1st and 2nd armies there is a secret society that is gradually increasing connections in the 4th reserve cavalry corps, and that he is sure that the Ensign of the Nezhinsky Cavalry Regiment, the ensign Vadkovsky, is one of the most important members, and finally ... he hopes to be introduced into this and to discover the secrets and members of it."

Returning to the south, on the instructions of Alexander I, he began to make acquaintance with the officers in different places and "clearly saw from their conversations that the conspiracy must be ubiquitous". Having reported to Arakcheyev everything that was possible to learn about the program, composition and objectives of the Southern Society, Sherwood on 10 November 1825 received an order from I. I. Dibich from Taganrog to act in the most energetic way; on 18 November he sent Dibich a detailed report on the results achieved. At the same time, Alexander I received confirmation of the conspiracy in a letter to Maiboroda.

Sherwood was transferred to a Guards Dragoon Regiment in 1826 after the suppression of the revolt. Nicholas I issued a decree before the Imperial Senate - "in commemoration of our special favor and appreciation for the excellent feat performed against the intruders, who infringed on the tranquility, the welfare of the state and on life itself, the blessed memory of the Emperor Alexander I" and granted Sherwood the title Sherwood Verny (Sherwood the Faithful) and a coat of arms. Sherwood was also promoted to lieutenant but was not popular with his fellow officers being nicknamed Sherwood-Skverny (Sherwood the Nasty).

In 1827 he joined the staff of Alexander von Benckendorff and later joined the guards corps. He took part in the Russo-Turkish War (1828–1829) and was awarded the order of St Anna (3rd degree) for his part in the siege of Varna. In 1831 participating in the suppression of the Polish uprising he distinguished himself and was awarded the Order of St. Vladimir of the 4th degree. Sherwood was promoted to colonel in 1833 and left the military.

== Later life ==
Sherwood was imprisoned in the Shlisselburg Fortress for seven years (1844-1851) following a false denunciation. After his release he was under secret surveillance and lived in his own village in the Smolensk district and was fully pardoned in 1856 after an appeal for clemency.

Sherwood married 3 times

- From 1826 - Ekaterina Alekseevna Ushakova, the daughter of a retired major
  - Konstantin (3 February 1829 - 16 December 1865), a godson of Grand Duke Konstantin Pavlovich is an artist.
  - Nikolai (born 22 July 1830), a godson of Grand Duke Mikhail Pavlovich
  - Sophia (born in 1832)
  - Olga (born 3 April 1834)
- From 1852 - Friederika Kirmisson (divorced Countess of Strutinskaya)
  - Emmanuel-Ivan-Heinrich (born 13 December 1984)
- From 1864 - Elizabeth A. von Parfenok, daughter of a collegiate adviser
  - Evgeniy
  - Mikhail
  - Viktor
