= Leonid Sherwood =

Russian sculptor and architect (1871–1954)

- Леонид Шервуд
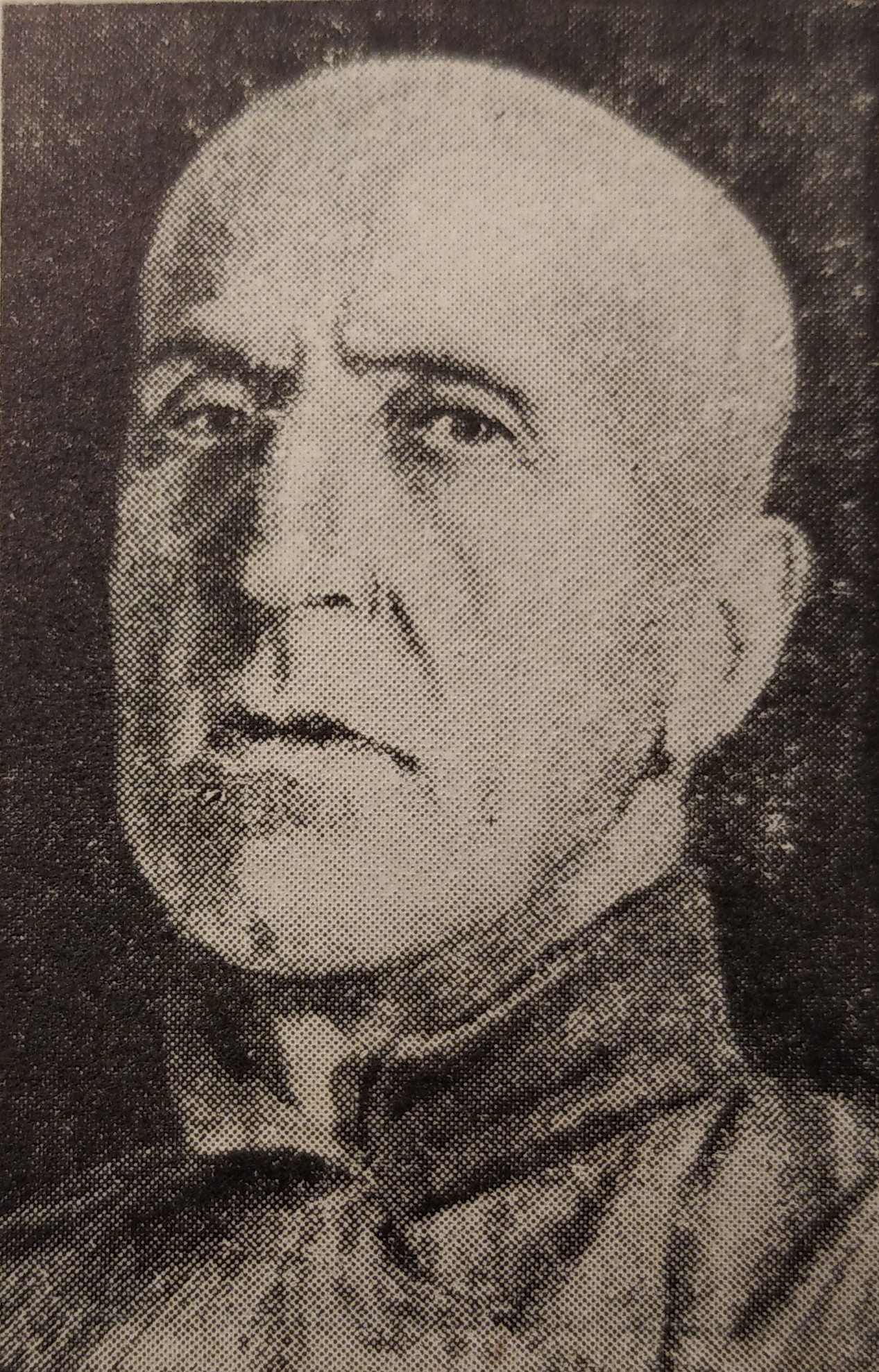
- Sherwood in 1933
- Born: April 28, 1871; Moscow, Russia
- Died: August 28, 1954 (aged 83); Leningrad, Soviet Union
- Resting place: Literatorskiye Mostki, Saint Petersburg
- Education: Moscow School of Painting, Sculpture and Architecture (1891); Imperial Academy of Arts (1898)
- Known for: Sculpture
- Notable work: Monument to Stepan Makarov (1913); The Sentry (1933); Swallow's Nest
- Awards: Order of the Red Banner of Labour; Honoured Artist of the RSFSR

Leonid Vladimirovich Sherwood or Shervud (Russian: Леони́д Влади́мирович Ше́рвуд; 28 April 1871 – 28 August 1954) was a Russian sculptor during the Modernist period.

== Biography ==
Sherwood was born in Moscow. He was of English descent, his grandfather Joseph Sherwood having been an English engineer who emigrated to Russia. His father was the architect Vladimir Osipovich Sherwood and his brother was the architect Vladimir Vladimirovich Sherwood.

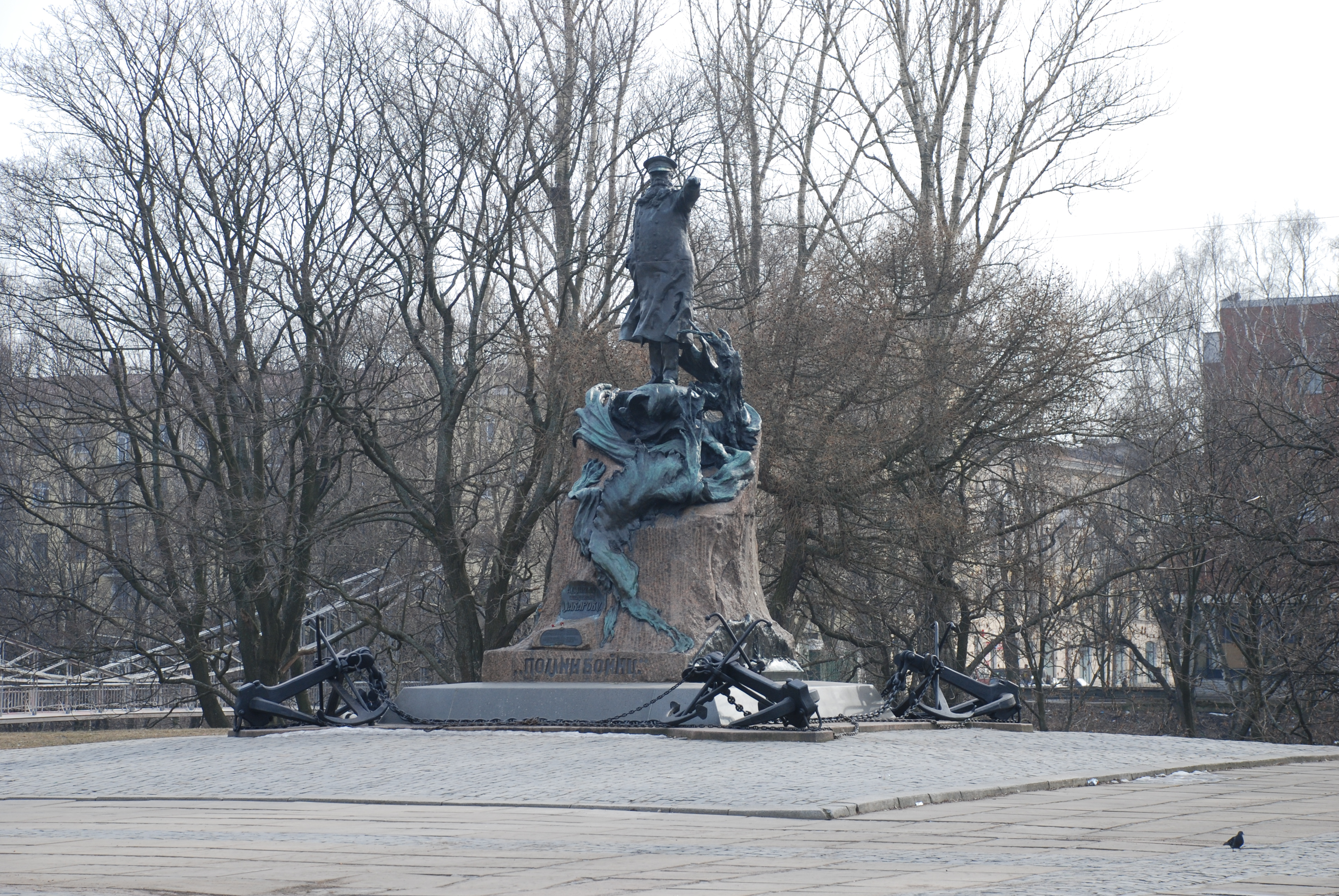
Statue of Admiral Stepan Makarov, created by Leonid Sherwood, on Anchor Square in front of the St. Nicholas Naval Cathedral, Kronstadt

Leonid Sherwood was responsible for the Makarov Monument, a memorial to Admiral Stepan Makarov, killed during the Russo-Japanese War. It was erected in 1913 on Anchor Square in front of the St. Nicholas Naval Cathedral in Kronstadt. Sherwood chose to use as the pedestal a 160-ton granite rock originally cut for a monument to Paul I in front of Kazan Cathedral, which sank in transit to Saint Petersburg. The base of the rock is engraved with the words: "Remember the War".

Sherwood was one of the first sculptors to be involved in monumental Soviet sculpture after the Revolution of 1917 and was responsible for many official busts and monumental statues. He was also the architect of the Swallow's Nest, a decorative castle in the Crimea.

Sherwood was educated at the Moscow School of Painting, Sculpture and Architecture (1886–91) and the Imperial Academy of Arts, St Petersburg (1892–1898), with Vladimir Beklemishev and Hugo Salemann being his formal professors. He was an exchange student in Paris in 1899–1900, where he became a pupil of Rodin. Returning to Russia, he lived in Petrograd and was employed by Vladimir Lenin for monumental sculpture. He taught sculpture at the Academy of Arts in Petrograd. Among his pupils was Sarra Lebedeva.

Sherwood was awarded the Order of the Red Banner of Labour and received the title of Honoured Artist of the RSFSR. He died in Leningrad, aged 83.

== Publications ==
- Sherwood, Leonid V. (1937). Путь скульптора [The Path of the Sculptor] (in Russian). Leningrad, Moscow: Iskusstvo. OCLC 1246547078.
- Sherwood, Leonid V.; et al. (2021). Sherwood, Viktoriya L. (ed.). Леонид Шервуд. Путь скульптора (in Russian). Saint Petersburg: St. Petersburg Union of Writers. ISBN 978-5-4311-0238-7. OCLC 1288456521.
