= Anchor Square =

City square in Kronstadt, Russia

Coordinates: 59.9919°N 29.7757°E

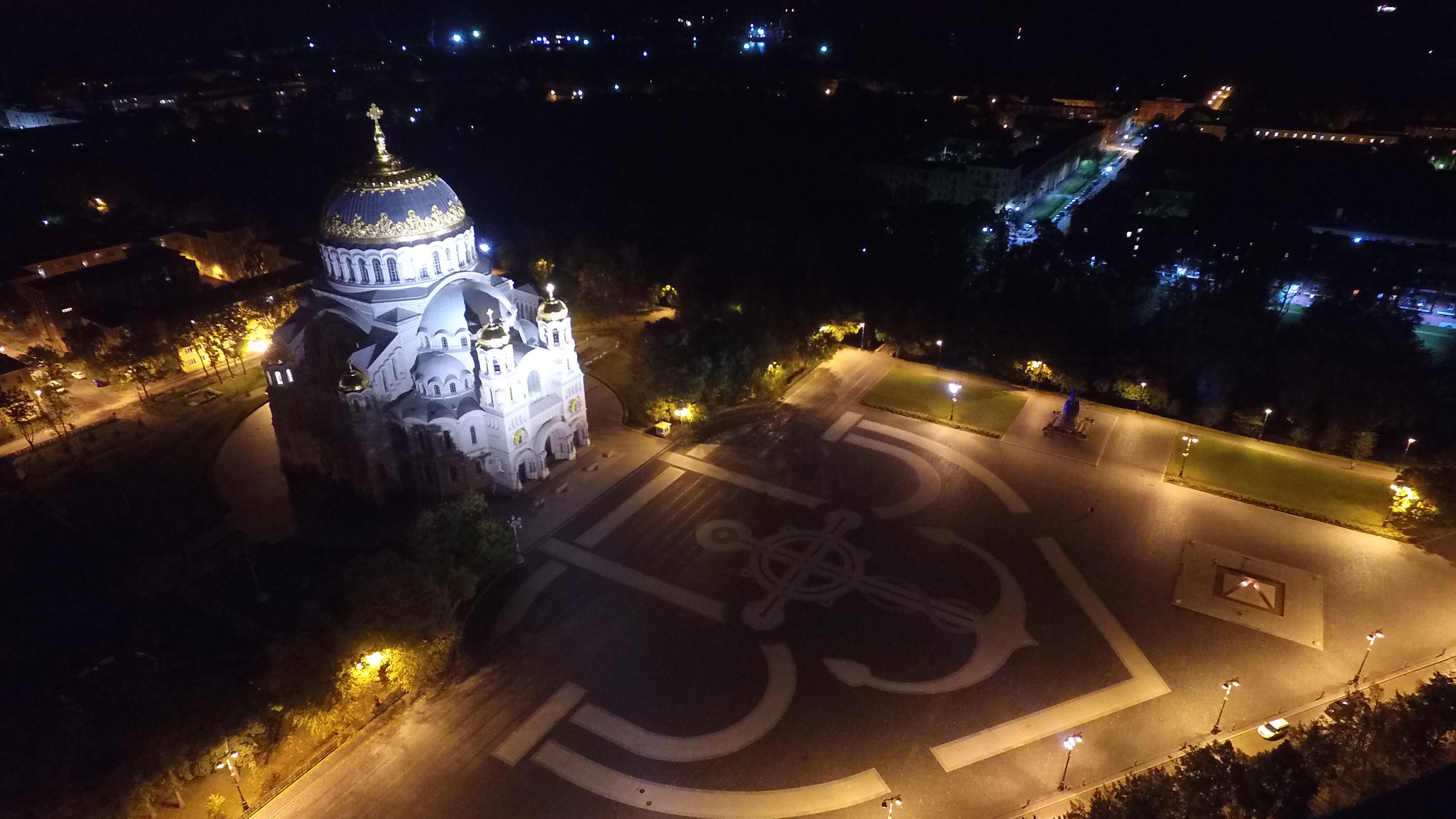
The square, as seen from above

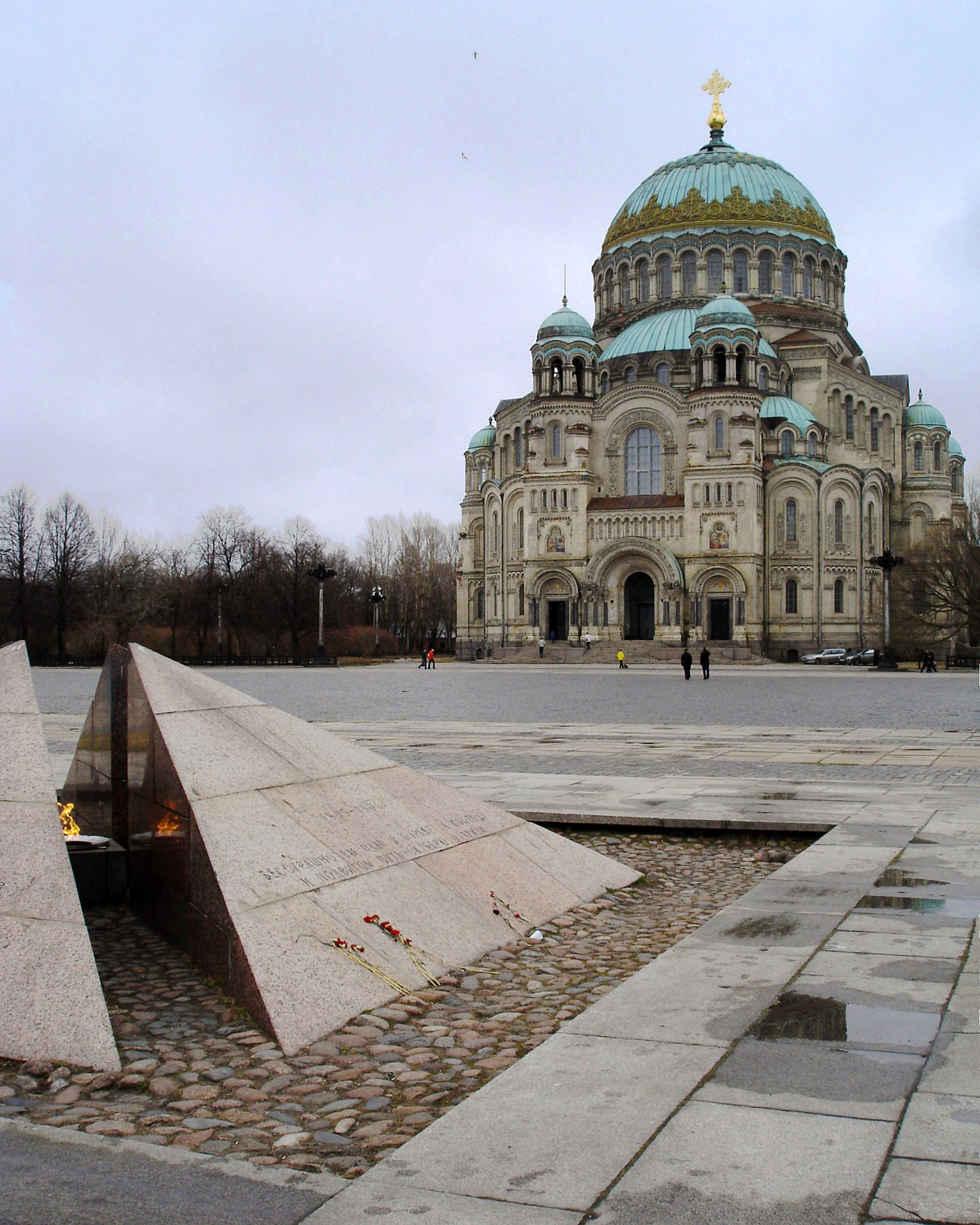
View of the Naval Cathedral and Eternal Flame monument on the Square

Anchor Square (Russian: Якорная площадь) is the central square in the city of Kronstadt, outside Saint Peterburg.
