= Russians in Nepal =

Regions with significant populations
- Kathmandu

Languages
- Nepali · Russian

Religion
- Russian Orthodox · Hinduism · Buddhism

Related ethnic groups
- Russians in India

Russians in Nepal from a tiny community consisting of expatriates from Russia as well as Nepalese people of Russian descent.

== Migration history ==
Russian expatriates, began trickling into Nepal at the end of the 1960s. Nepalese men, who went to pursue their university education in the Soviet Union, began returning home, bringing their Russian wives with them whom they married while they were studying abroad. That trend continued, bringing more Russian women to Nepal, as the number of Nepali students on scholarships at Soviet universities continued to rise through the 1970s and 1980s and by the 1990s there were 24 families of Nepalis with Russian spouses settled in Nepal, the vast majority in Kathmandu.

As more Nepalis returned home in the wake of the collapse of the Soviet Union, that number swelled, reaching 58 at its peak in the early 2000s. Today, with immigration drawing increasing numbers of educated Nepalis abroad, many of the younger families have left, currently leaving roughly 25 Russian women settled in Kathmandu.

== Culture ==
Among the main concerns of the Russian women living in Nepal was ensuring that their children grew up with a sense of the Russian language and culture. These needs soon gave rise to the Russian Culture Center. Established in 1979, the center organizes Russian holiday celebrations and film screenings for the Russian community.

== See also ==
- Nepalis in Russia
- Nepal–Russia relations
