= Protests against the Russo-Ukrainian war (2022–present) =

Protests against the Russian invasion of Ukraine
- Part of the 2022 Russian invasion of Ukraine and Russian opposition protest rallies
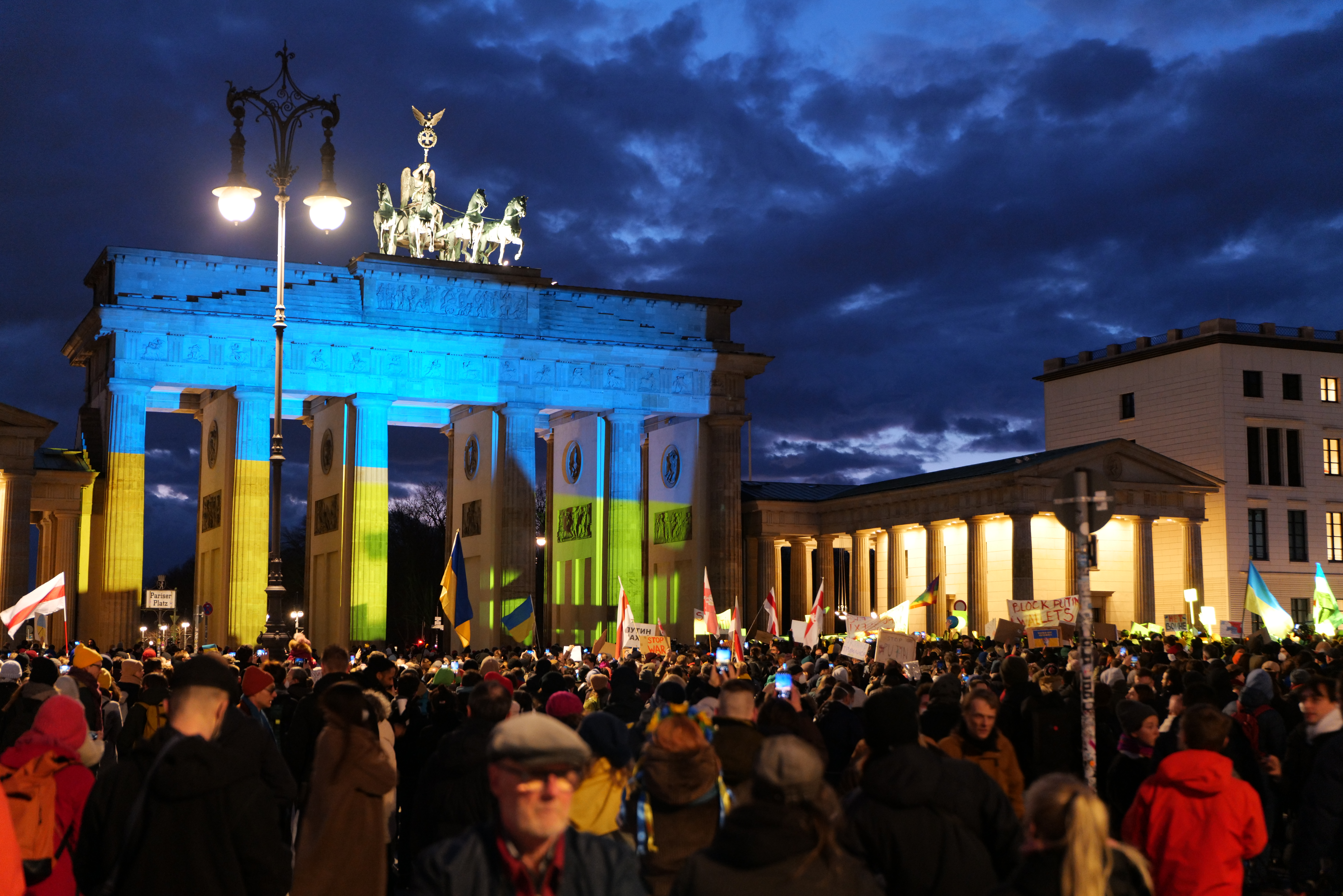
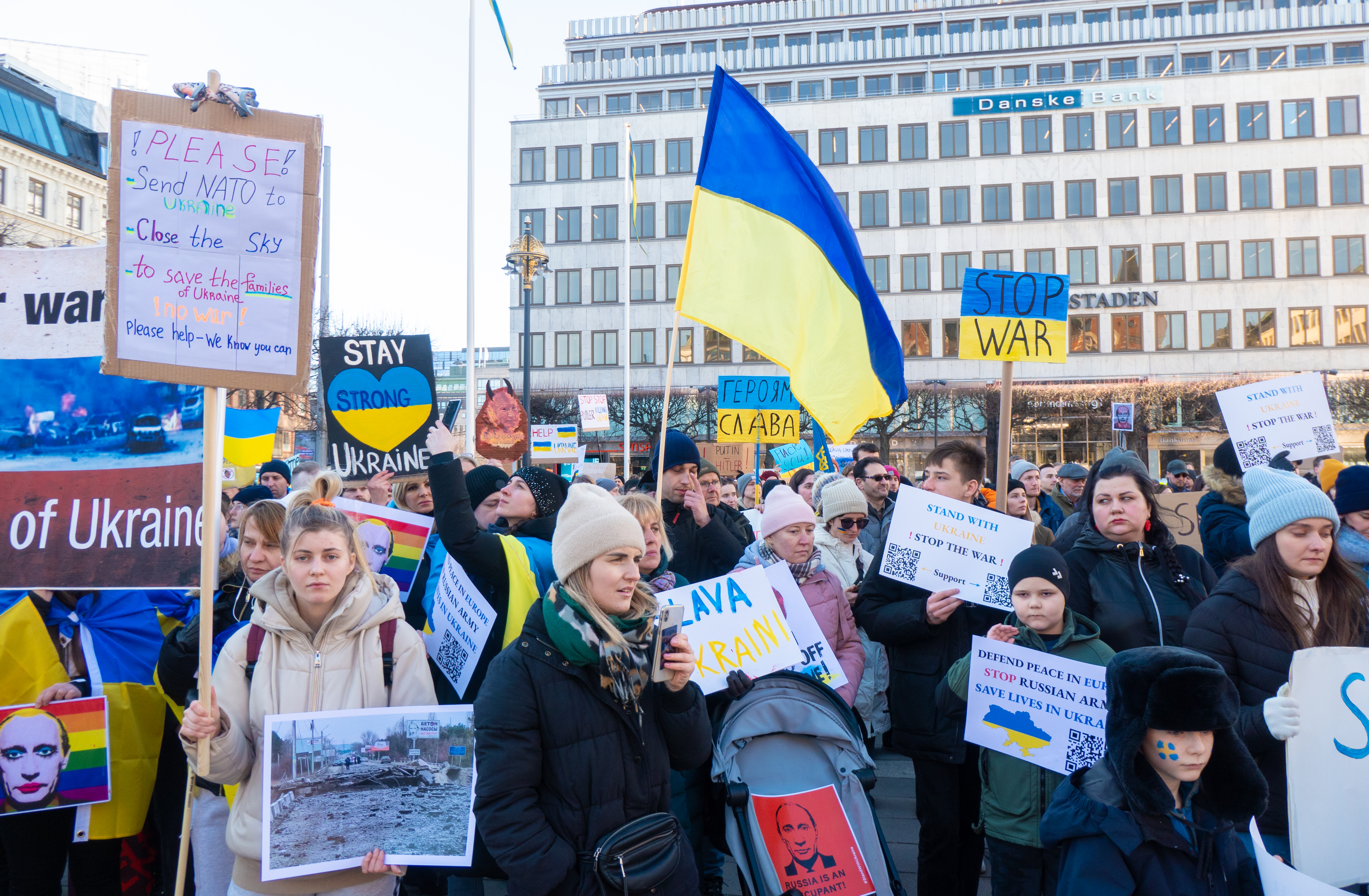
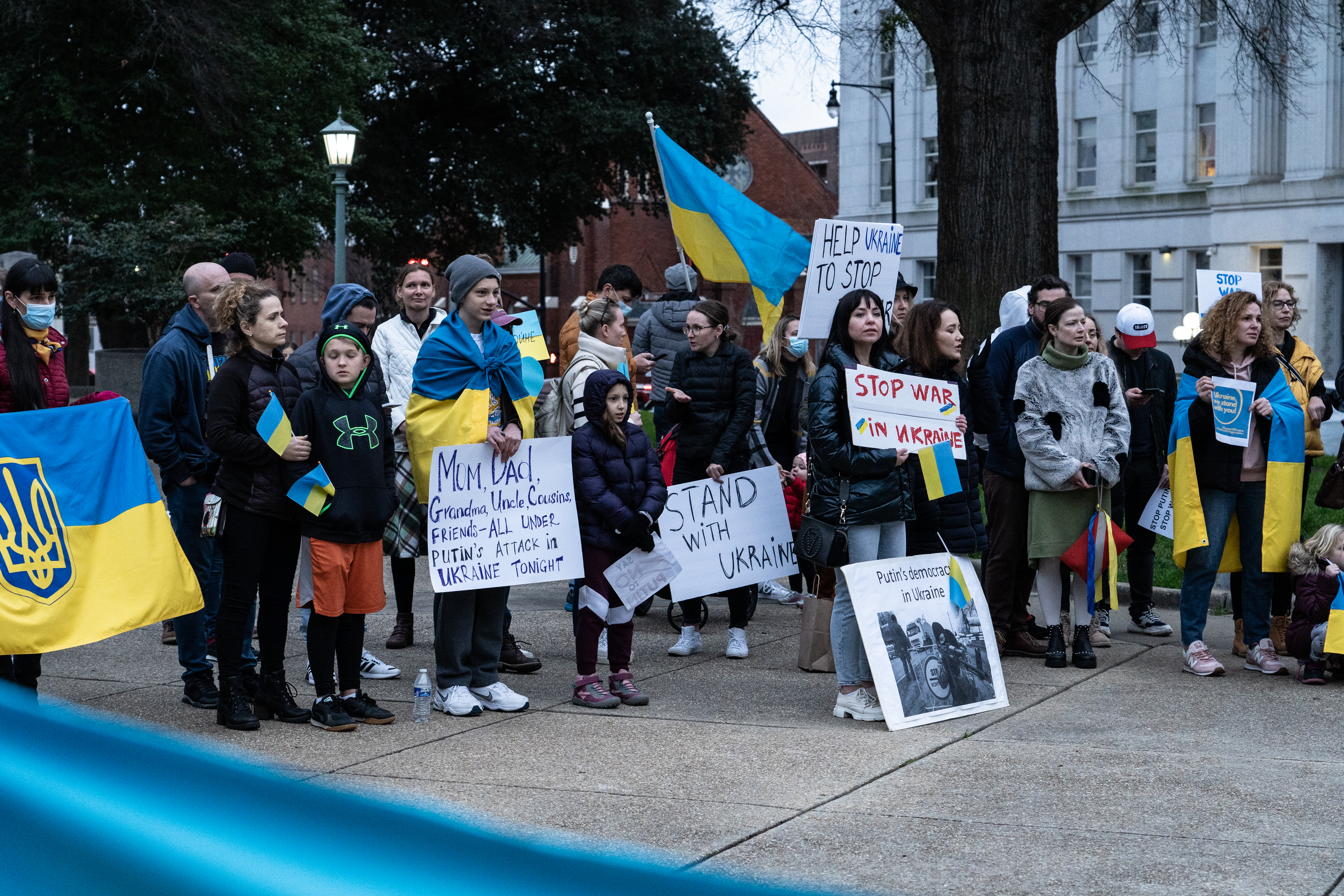
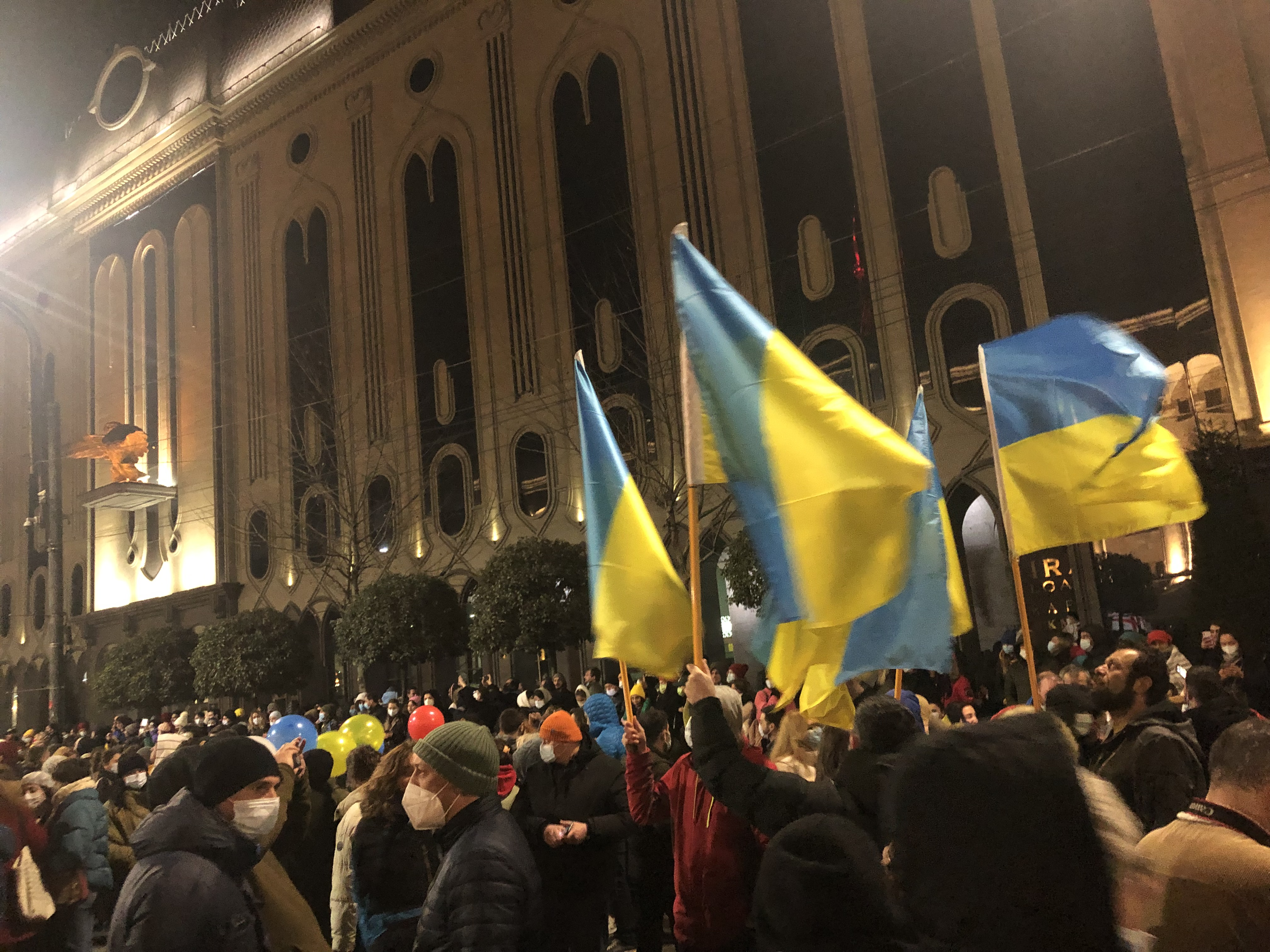
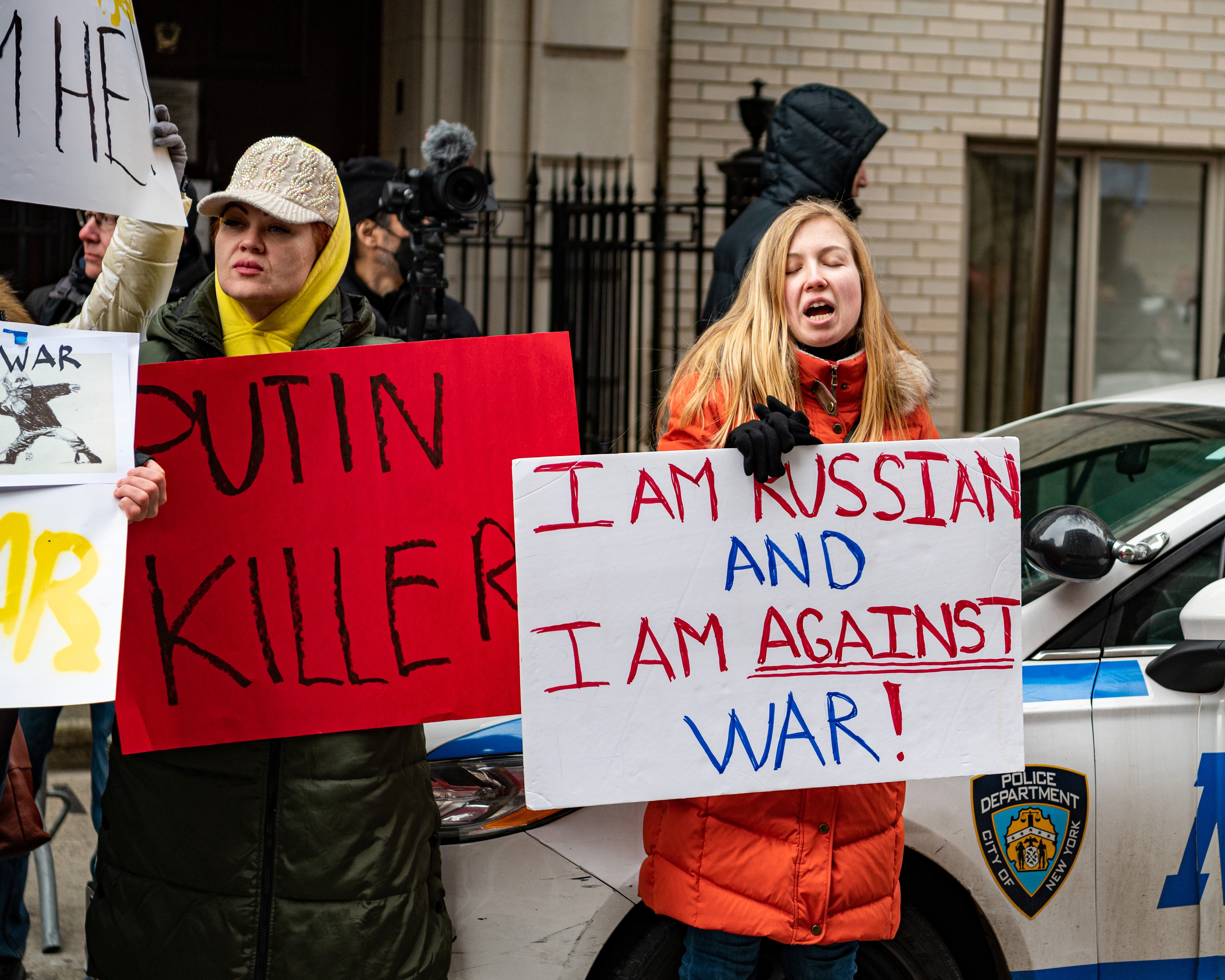
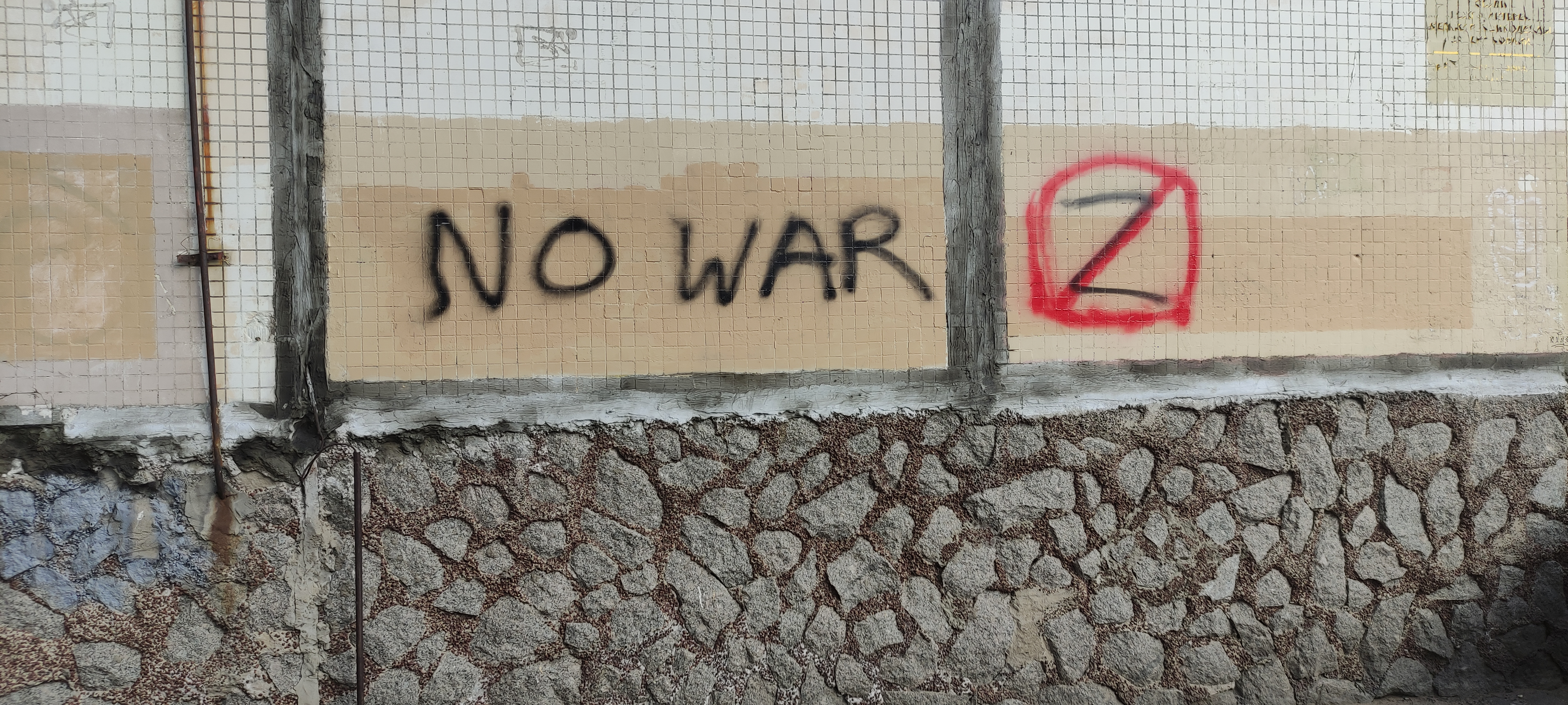
- Protesters at the Brandenburg Gate in Berlin, Germany Marina Ovsyannikova protesting during a news report, 14 March 2022 Protesters in Stockholm Pro-Ukraine rally in Raleigh Scott Memorial in Cardiff illuminated in support of Ukraine Ukraine solidarity protests in Tbilisi Anti-war protests in New York City Anti-war inscription in Saint Petersburg
- Date: 24 February 2022 − ongoing (4 years, 8 months, 2 weeks and 5 days)
- Location: Multiple countries worldwide Albania, Andorra, Argentina, Armenia, Austria, Australia, Azerbaijan, Belarus, Belgium, Bolivia, Bosnia and Herzegovina, Brazil, Bulgaria, Canada, Chile, Colombia, Costa Rica, Croatia, Cyprus, Czech Republic, Denmark, Estonia, Ecuador, Finland, France, Georgia, Germany, Greece, Hungary, Hong Kong, Iceland, India, Indonesia, Iran, Ireland, Israel, Italy, Japan, Kazakhstan, Kosovo, Kyrgyzstan, Latvia, Lebanon, Lithuania, Luxembourg, Malaysia, Malta, Mexico, Moldova, Mongolia, Montenegro, Nepal, Netherlands, New Zealand, North Macedonia, Norway, Pakistan, Panama, Peru, Philippines, Poland, Portugal, Romania, Russia, Serbia, Slovakia, South Africa, South Korea, Spain, Sri Lanka, Sweden, Switzerland, Taiwan, Thailand, Turkey, United Kingdom, United States, Uruguay, Venezuela
- Caused by: Opposition to the Russo-Ukrainian War; Opposition to the authority of Vladimir Putin
- Goals: Military withdrawal of Russia from Ukraine; Resignation of Vladimir Putin; Resignation of Mikhail Mishustin; Release of Alexei Navalny
- Methods: Demonstrations; Internet activism; Strike action; Boycott movement

Parties
In Russia and Belarus: Russian opposition: Feminist Anti-War Resistance; Vesna; Belarusian opposition Worldwide: (Ukraine) Ukrainian diaspora Anti-war Russian expats Anti-war Belarusian expats Supported by: Ukraine	Government of Russia: Ministry of Internal Affairs; Police; National Guard; National Guard Forces Command; OMON; SOBR; Ministry of Defence; Government of Belarus: Ministry of Internal Affairs; Internal Troops; Militsiya

Lead figures
	(Russia) Vladimir Putin; Mikhail Mishustin; Alexander Lukashenko

Casualties
- Arrested: 24 February: 1,745; 25 February: 437; 26 February: 413

Protests against the Russian invasion of Ukraine occurred simultaneously in many places worldwide, including in Russia and in Russian-occupied Ukraine.

== In Russia ==
In the seven days from 24 February to 2 March, over 6,500 people in 53 cities across Russia have been detained by police for protesting against the invasion. Since the start of the war until 6 March nearly 13,000 have been detained.

On 24 February, over 60 Russian activists and journalists have been arrested.

In violation of the Russian Constitution and international human rights law, Putin has made peaceful public protest without permission of the authorities illegal.

This background information is necessary to understand the extreme intimidation caused by the large number of arrests and by the seemingly reasonable warning of the authorities to not take part in "unsanctioned" protests. Russian authorities warned Russians of legal repercussions for joining anti-war protests.

On 27 February, another 2,063 people were detained at street protests against the war.

On 27 February, a van with markings that read "People, wake up!", "This is war", "Putin is scum!" crashed and caught fire in Pushkinskaya Square.

More than 30,000 technology workers, 6,000 medical workers, 3,400 architects, more than 4,300 teachers, more than 17,000 artists, 5,000 scientists, and 2,000 actors, directors, and other creative figures signed open letters calling for Putin's government to stop the war. Some Russians who signed petitions against Russia's war in Ukraine have already lost their jobs.

Over 281,000 Russians signed a petition to impeach Putin.

On 9 March, an unnamed person burned down a military comissariat in Lukhovitsy (Moscow Oblast) with the intent of destroying the personal files of conscripts to prevent them from being sent to war.

=== Academics ===
Troitsky variant (also known as TrV-Nauka), an independent Russian popular science newspaper, published an open letter against war signed by more than 7400 Russian scientists including many famous academics and members of the Russian Academy of Sciences. Oleg Anisimov, a scientist delegate from Russia, apologized to his colleague from Ukraine at the UN climate conference. Mikhail Gelfand, bioinformatician and a member of the Academia Europaea, also made a statement against war.

1,200 students, faculty and staff of the Moscow State Institute of International Relations, affiliated with the Ministry of Foreign Affairs, signed an open letter stating that they "consider it morally unacceptable to stay on the sidelines and keep silent when people are dying in a neighboring state. They are dying through the fault of those who preferred weapons instead of peaceful diplomacy. .... Many generations of future diplomats will have to rebuild the trust in Russia and the good relations with our neighbors that have been lost." Students, graduate students, teachers, staff and graduates of the oldest university in Russia, Moscow State University named after M.V. Lomonosov – 7500 people in total – also signed an open letter against the "special military operation".

=== Activists ===
On 24 February, human rights activist Lev Ponomaryov started a petition to protest the invasion, which gathered more than 1,5 million signatures by 3 March.

=== Businesspeople and oligarchs ===
A number of Russian entrepreneurs, businesspeople and billionaires, including Oleg Deripaska, Mikhail Fridman, Oleg Tinkov, Mikhail Khodorkovsky, Nikolay Storonsky of Revolut, Vladimir Lisin, Alexei Mordashov and Andrei Melnichenko, have spoken out against the invasion, and called on for the Russian military forces to be withdrawn from Ukraine.

On 3 March, Lukoil, the second-largest Russian energy company after Gazprom, called for a ceasefire and diplomatic means to solve the conflict.

=== Celebrities ===
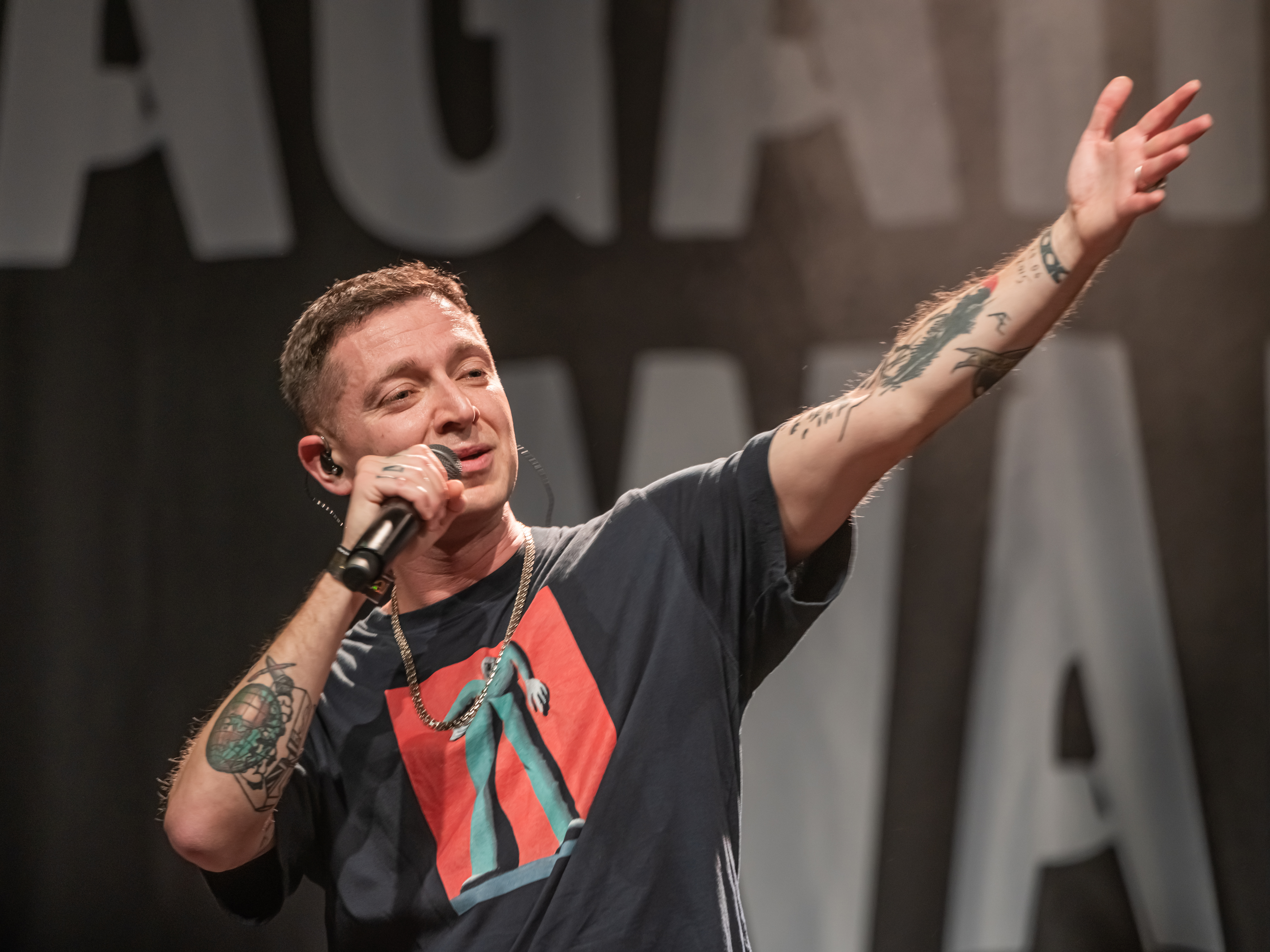
Russian rapper Oxxxymiron announced a series of benefit concerts outside Russia, titled "Russians Against War", the proceeds from which would be donated to NGOs helping Ukrainian refugees.

The invasion was condemned by television presenter Ksenia Sobchak, pop star Valery Meladze, writer Dmitry Glukhovsky, journalist and YouTuber Yury Dud, film director Roman Volobuev, rapper Noize MC, Dynamo Moscow striker Fyodor Smolov, actress Chulpan Khamatova, actor Danila Kozlovsky and the television host Ivan Urgant. Urgant's late-night show subsequently disappeared from the scheduled programs on the state-owned TV station Channel One. Dozens of other Russian artists, TV presenters and other celebrities spoke out on social networks against Russia's military actions in Ukraine.

Russian rapper Oxxxymiron cancelled six sold-out concerts in Moscow and St. Petersburg, stating, "I cannot entertain you when Russian missiles are falling on Ukraine. When residents of Kyiv are forced to hide in basements and in the metro, while people are dying." He went on to announce a series of benefit concerts in other countries, entitled "Russians Against War", the proceeds from which would be donated to NGOs helping Ukrainian refugees. The first of these concerts was held in Istanbul, which has a large Russian diaspora consisting of people who left the country in protest of the invasion.

In September 2022, Russian pop legend Alla Pugacheva spoke out against the invasion, writing that Russians were dying in Ukraine for "illusory goals", and that the invasion was "turning our country into a pariah and worsening the lives of our citizens." Russian authorities began investigating Pugacheva for "discrediting" the military.

Russian comedian and singer Maxim Galkin has been openly critical about the Russian invasion of Ukraine. He accused the Russian authorities of hypocrisy and lies with respect to war crimes that Russia has committed in firing rockets at the Ukrainian city of Odesa, its destruction of Mariupol and its atrocities in Bucha.

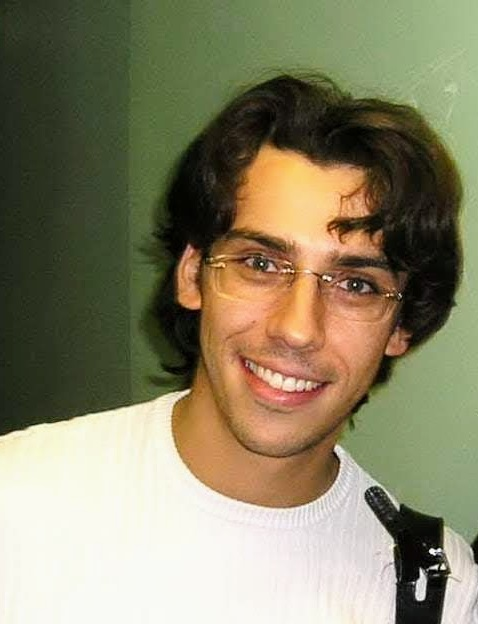
Maxim Galkin publicly condemned the invasion

In October 2022, Russian actor Artur Smolyaninov was charged for "discrediting" the Russian army – that was after his anti-war-statements and after he had left Russia. In an interview in early January 2023, he stated that he would fight for Ukraine, not Russia, if he had to take part in the Russo-Ukrainian War.

=== Sports ===
NHL hockey player Alexander Ovechkin criticized Russia's invasion of Ukraine. Tennis players Daniil Medvedev, Andrey Rublev and Yevgeny Kafelnikov and other Russian sportsmen also made statements against the war.

Figure skater Evgenia Medvedeva spoke out on her Instagram account, writing "I hope this all ends as soon as possible, like a bad dream."

Dutch motorsports racer Max Verstappen refused to race in Russia and said “When a country is at war, it is not correct to race there.”

=== Military ===
A commander of Russia's 74th Guards Motor Rifle Brigade was reportedly quoted as saying; "We were not going to fight – we were collecting information" after the entire platoon was reportedly captured in Chernihiv. These comments were frequently shown in videos published by the Ukrainian military, of captured Russian soldiers that were potentially made under duress. The soldiers in the video's made comments such as; "I didn't know we were going to Ukraine, I was tricked." and "We were deceived and used like a meat shield." Others were reportedly refusing to carry out orders or sabotaging their own equipment in order to avoid combat, while suffering from lack of resources and low morale.

=== Organizations ===
The founders of the "Immortal Regiment" commemoration movement, in which ordinary Russians carry photographs of veteran family members in marches around Russia held annually to mark WWII Victory Day on 9 May, called on the Putin "to cease fire", describing the use of force as "inhuman".

Olga Larkina, the director of Russia's Committee of Soldiers' Mothers, raised concerns to Russian investigative news outlet Meduza that many of the soldiers in Ukraine had been forcibly sent to Ukraine. Larkina alleged that Russian conscripts had been pressured or forced into signing contracts to become soldiers, sent to Ukraine and family members have lost contact with them.

=== Politicians and government officials ===
Novosibirsk city councilor Helga Pirogova wearing the Ukrainian vyshyvanka and a wreath of sunflowers to protest the invasion

Jailed Russian opposition leader Alexei Navalny condemned Russia's attack on Ukraine and called those who launched the war "bandits and thieves." He also called for more anti-war protests as well as protests against Putin. Russian opposition activist and politician Marina Litvinovich called for anti-war protests in Russian cities. She was detained by Russian police as she left her house.

State Duma deputy Mikhail Matveev voted in favor of the recognition of the Donetsk and Luhansk People's Republics but later denounced the 2022 Russian invasion of Ukraine, stating "I voted for peace, not for war. I wanted Russia to become a shield so that Donbas would not be bombed, not for Kyiv to be bombed." State Duma deputy Oleg Smolin said he was "shocked" by the invasion. Liza Peskova, daughter of Putin's spokesman Dmitry Peskov, shared an image with the "No to war" hashtag on Instagram.

More than 100 Russian municipal deputies signed a letter against the war with Ukraine. One of the deputies, Alexander Budberg, sent a request to State Duma for the impeachment of Vladimir Putin.

On 27 February, Russian politician Lyudmila Narusova, a member of the Federation Council, stated in a television interview: "I do not identify myself with those representatives of the state that speak out in favor of the war. I think they themselves do not know what they are doing. They are following orders without thinking."

Arkady Dvorkovich, who served as Russia's Deputy Prime Minister from 2012 to 2018, also condemned the invasion.

On 16 March, the member of Novosibirsk city council Helga Pirogova called on to immediately withdraw the Russian troops from Ukrainian territory, and attended the city council meeting wearing a blue vyshyvanka and a wreath of sunflowers (both of which are traditional symbols of Ukraine) to protest the invasion.

On 23 March, Putin's longtime advisor and Russian climate envoy Anatoly Chubais resigned from his position and left Russia due to his opposition to the war.

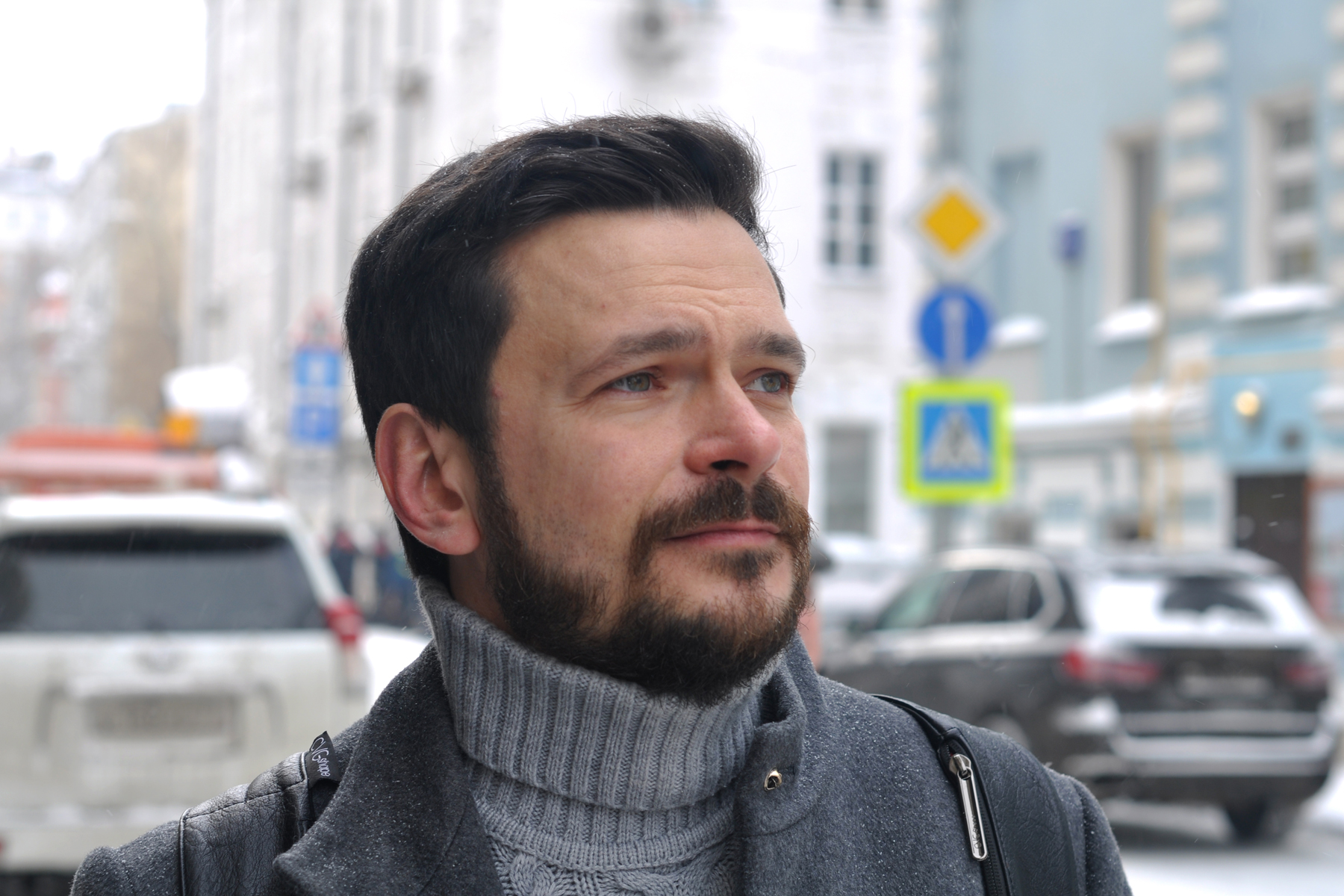
Ilya Yashin was sentenced to eight-and-a-half years in prison for his anti-war statements

On 23 May 2022, Boris Bondarev, a senior career diplomat, announced that he had resigned from his position in protest over the Russian invasion of Ukraine, referring to the invasion as an "aggressive war".

In July 2022, Alexei Gorinov, a member of the Krasnoselsky district council in Moscow, was sentenced to seven years in prison after making anti-war comments at a council meeting in March, including stating that "our country has aggressively attacked a neighbouring country" and "kids in Ukraine are dying each day". Lawyer Pavel Chikov said that this was the first jail term under the new Russian 2022 war censorship laws.

In August 2022, opposition politician Yevgeny Roizman was detained for his use of the word "invasion" for Russia's invasion of Ukraine.

In December 2022, Russian opposition politician Ilya Yashin was sentenced to 8 1/2 years in prison. Yashin condemned the killings in Bucha and said that Russian forces in Ukraine were responsible for the massacre.

=== Press ===
Russian Nobel Peace Prize winner Dmitry Muratov announced that the Novaya Gazeta newspaper would publish its next edition in both Ukrainian and Russian. Muratov, journalist Mikhail Zygar, director Vladimir Mirzoyev, and others signed a document stating that Ukraine was not a threat to Russia and calling for Russian citizens "to say no to this war." Elena Chernenko, a journalist at Kommersant, circulated a critical open letter that was signed by 170 journalists and academics.

=== State television pundits ===
A digital recreation of Marina Ovsyannikova's anti-war poster as seen on a live broadcast of Channel One Russia.

On 10 March, during a broadcast on Russia-1, the filmmaker and pundit Karen Shakhnazarov, who initially supported the invasion, called for an end to it, saying that the situation was at risk of becoming "an absolute humanitarian disaster", and that there is no realistic possibility for the Russian forces to seize Kyiv and other major Ukrainian cities.

During the broadcast of Sunday Evening with Vladimir Solovyov, the State Duma member Semyon Bagdasarov described the situation with Ukraine as "another Afghanistan, but even worse". He added that on the Ukrainian side, "there are more people and they're more advanced in their weapon handling [than the Russians]", and concluded: "We don't need that. Enough already".

On 14 March, a live broadcast of Channel One Russia was interrupted by news editor Marina Ovsyannikova holding a poster stating "No War. Stop the war, don't believe the propaganda, here you are being lied to. Russians against war." and shouting "Stop the war. No to war." before she was arrested. Following Ovsyannikova's protest, an anonymous source working at the All-Russia State Television and Radio Broadcasting Company stated that the majority of Russian state TV employees oppose the invasion, and Ovsyannikova merely voiced out loud the general sentiment of her colleagues. This information was independently confirmed by Elena Afanasyeva, the former head of creative planning at Channel One, who said that many state TV employees disagree with the channel's coverage of the war, and by another anonymous source close to Channel One who asserted that all of the channel's employees acknowledge that they're spreading lies about the war, and are dissatisfied with this state of affairs. Ever since 24 February, a number of employees, including Lilia Gildeeva, Zhanna Agalakova, Maria Baronova and several other RT reporters, resigned from state TV in protest of the invasion; some of them subsequently left the country.

=== Universities ===
At the beginning of March, the community of Moscow State University issued a joint statement condemning the invasion and calling on withdraw the Russian troops from Ukraine. On April 17, a similar statement was issued by the community of Novosibirsk State University.

=== Other professional communities ===
Open letters against the war were also published by professional associations of doctors and healthcare workers, NGO workers, lawyers, psychologists and psychiatrists, teachers, students, economists, employees of IT companies, workers of culture and art, comedians, workers in the beauty and fashion industry, film makers, advertising and gaming industries, designers, animators, and architects.

=== Arrests ===
By March 6, reports regarding citizens arrested for protesting reached over 4000; an estimated 4888 protestors became the victim of the arrest in 69 cities. About 2319 people were detained in Moscow as of March 7, and more reports suggested that police might retain more people than the issued list.

St. Petersburg continually witnessed the proliferation of mass detentions, with 750 detained among 1500 participants. In other locations, 1061 people were arrested among 1200 people who participated in the demonstration.

Putin introduced prison sentences of up to 15 years for publishing "fake news" about Russian military operations. More than 2,000 people were charged by May 2022 under the laws prohibiting "fake" information about the military. As of December 2022, more than 4,000 people were prosecuted for criticizing the war in Ukraine.

== Outside Russia ==
=== Media ===
On 25 February, the Slovak tabloid Nový čas published Putin's photo edited to look like Hitler with the term 'Putler' on its cover. Similar photos were also published by the British tabloid Daily Star (which called Putin "bloody Vlad") and by the Italian newspaper La Ragione.

=== Protests ===
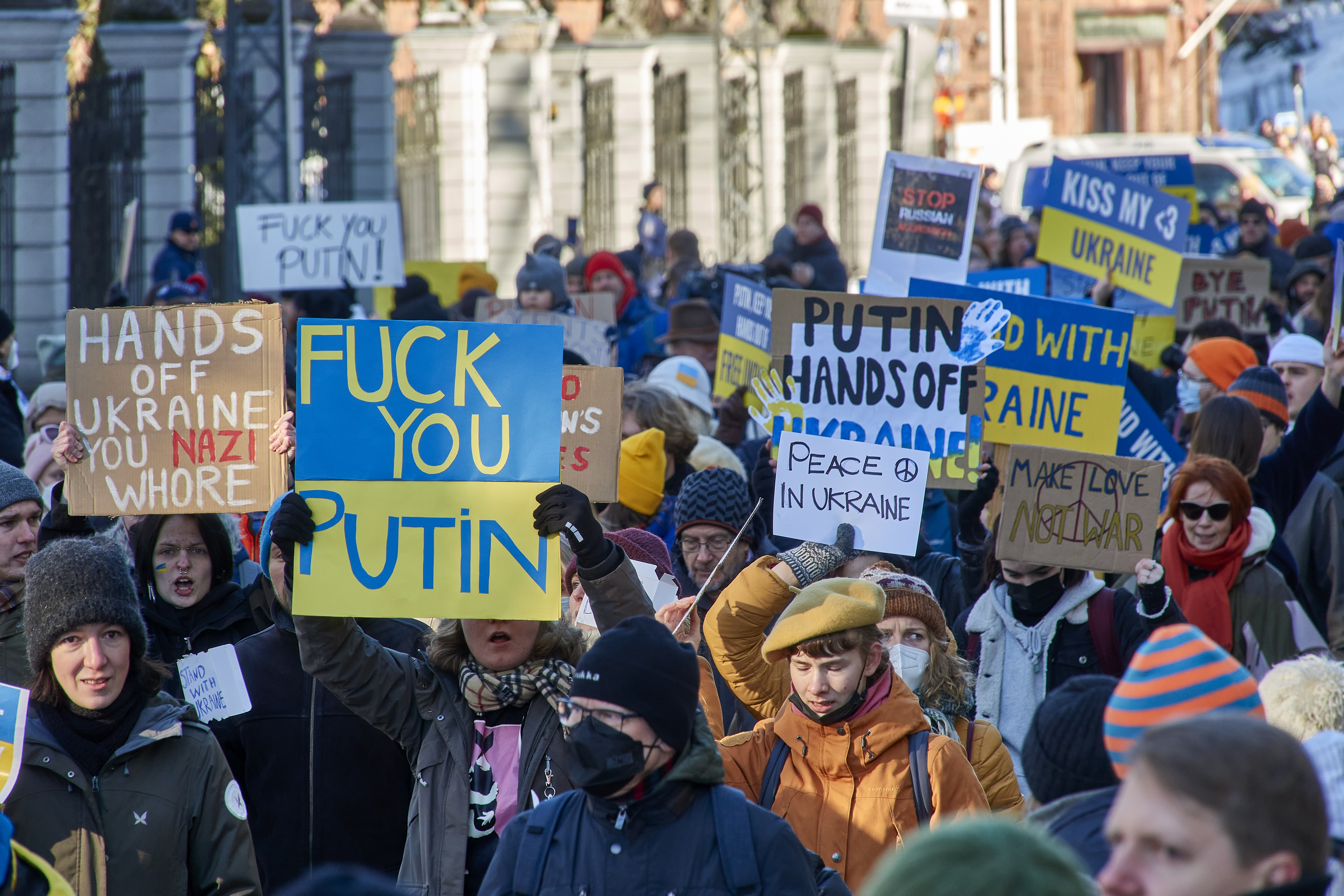
Anti-war protest in Helsinki, Finland, 26 February 2022

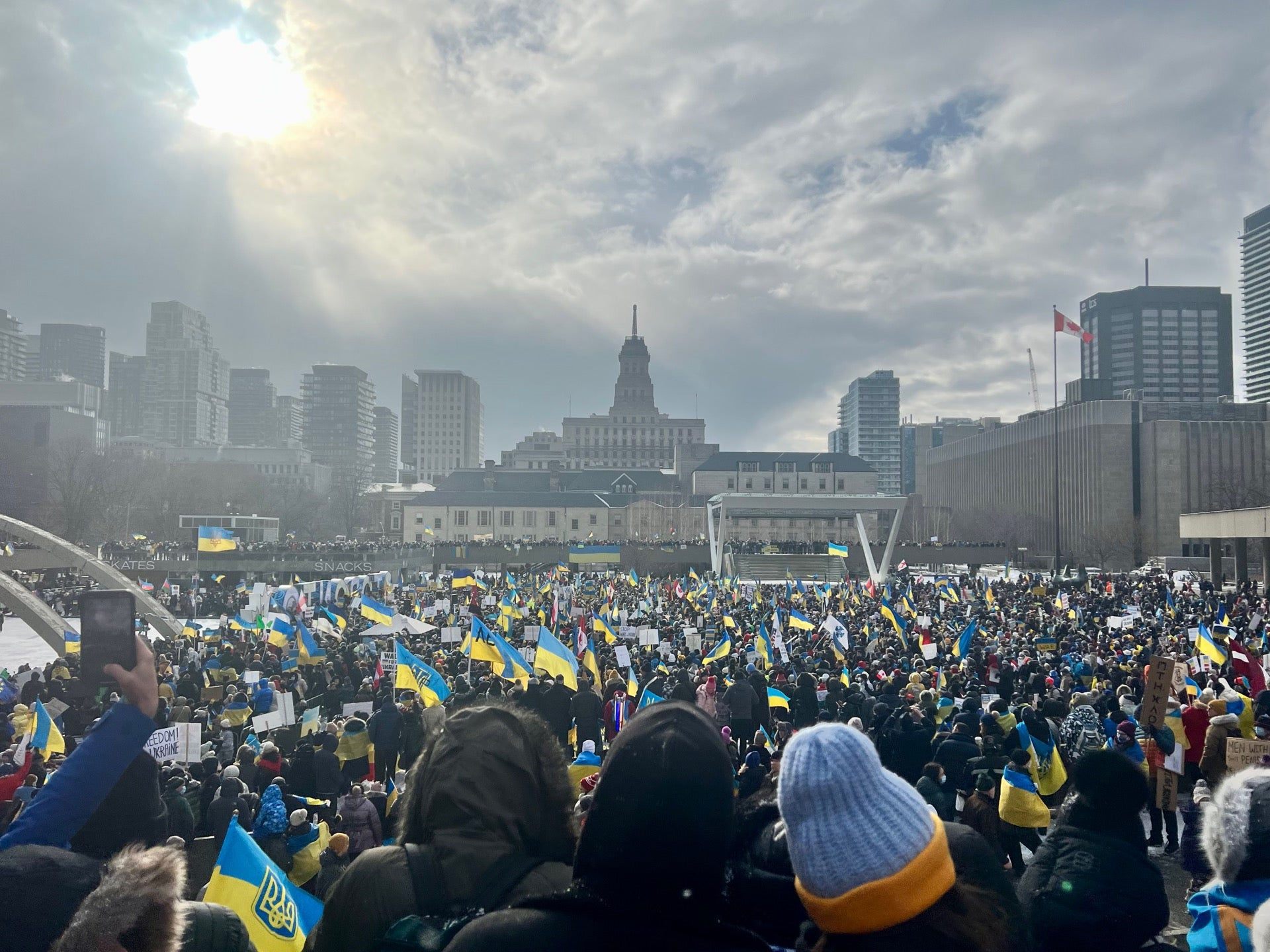
Anti-war protest in Toronto, Canada, 27 February 2022

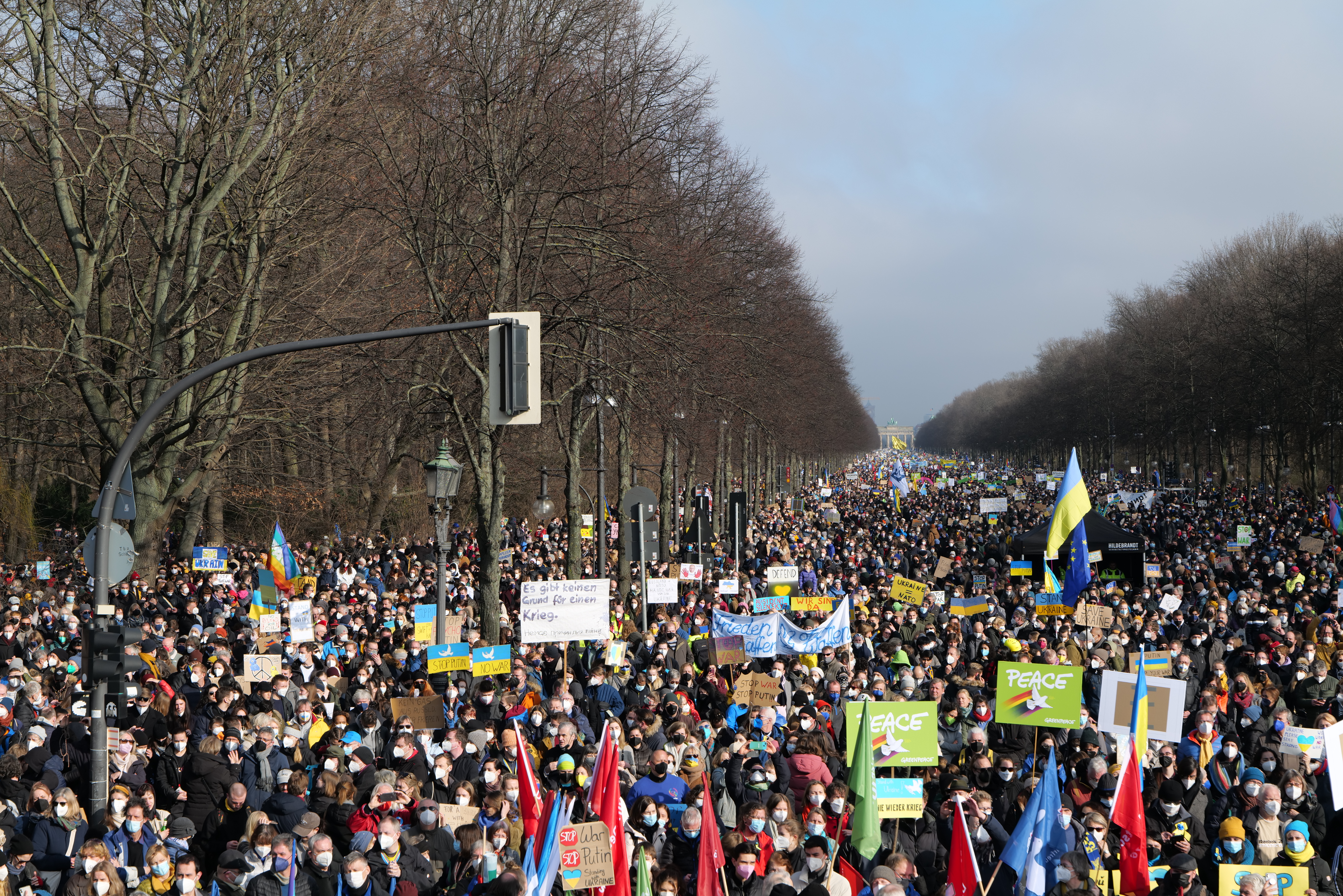
Anti-war protest in Berlin, Germany, 27 February 2022

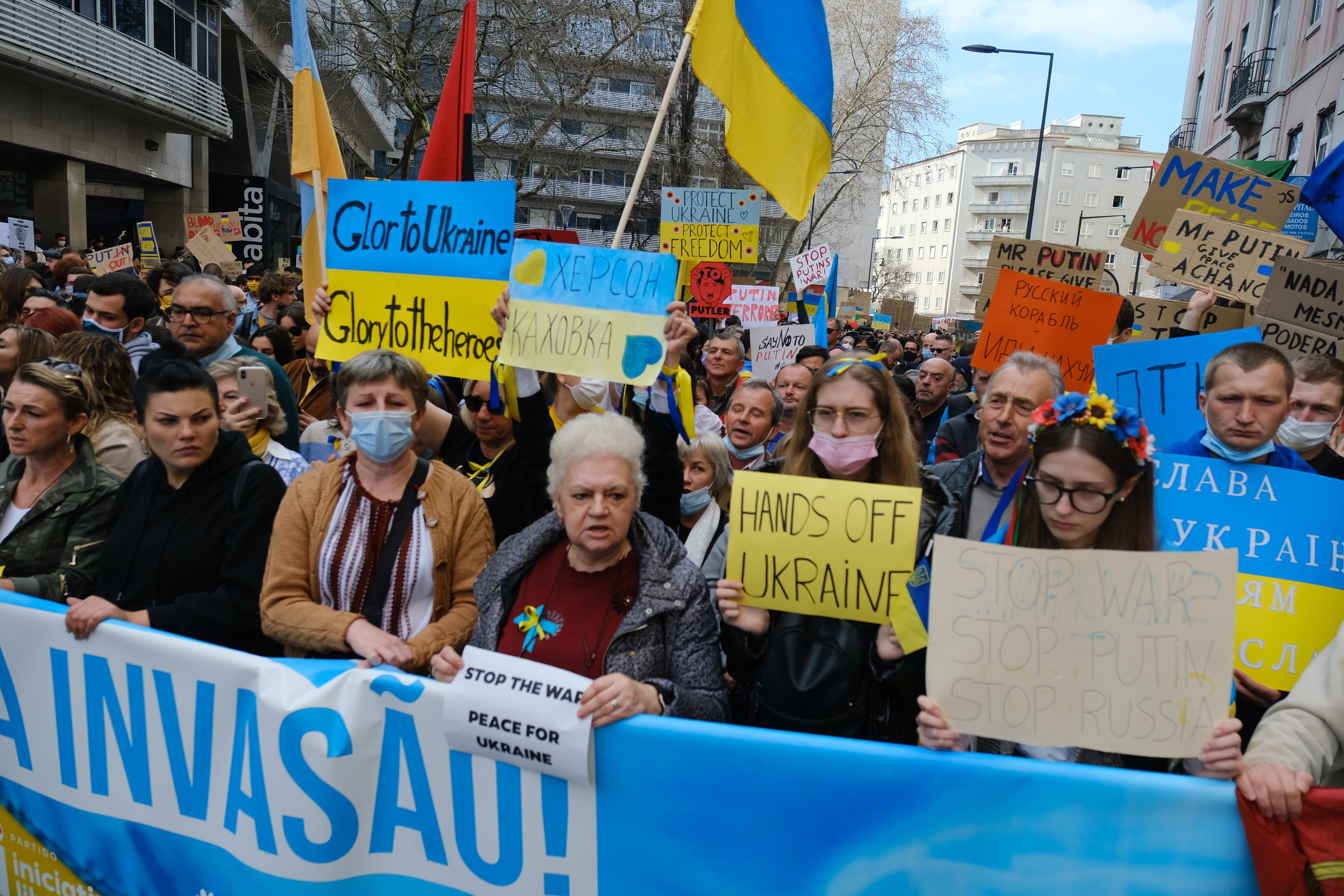
Anti-war protest in Lisbon, Portugal, 27 February 2022

Pro-Ukrainian protests have occurred at several of Russia's embassies and consulates abroad, including those in:

- Albania
- Andorra
- Argentina
- Armenia
- Azerbaijan
- Bangladesh
- Belarus
- Belgium
- Bolivia
- Bosnia and Herzegovina
- Brazil
- Bulgaria
- Canada
- Chile
- Colombia
- Costa Rica
- Croatia
- Czech Republic
- Denmark
- Ecuador
- Estonia
- Finland
- France
- Georgia
- Greece
- Hungary
- Iceland
- India
- Indonesia
- Iran
- Ireland
- Israel
- Italy
- Japan
- Kazakhstan
- Kosovo
- Kyrgyzstan
- Latvia
- Lebanon
- Lithuania
- Malaysia
- Malta
- Mexico
- Moldova
- Mongolia
- Montenegro
- Nepal
- Netherlands
- New Zealand
- North Macedonia
- Norway
- Pakistan
- Panama
- Peru
- Philippines
- Poland
- Portugal
- Romania
- Serbia
- Slovakia
- Slovenia
- South Africa
- South Korea
- Spain
- Sri Lanka
- Sweden
- Taiwan
- Thailand
- Turkey
- United Kingdom
- United States
- Uruguay
- Venezuela

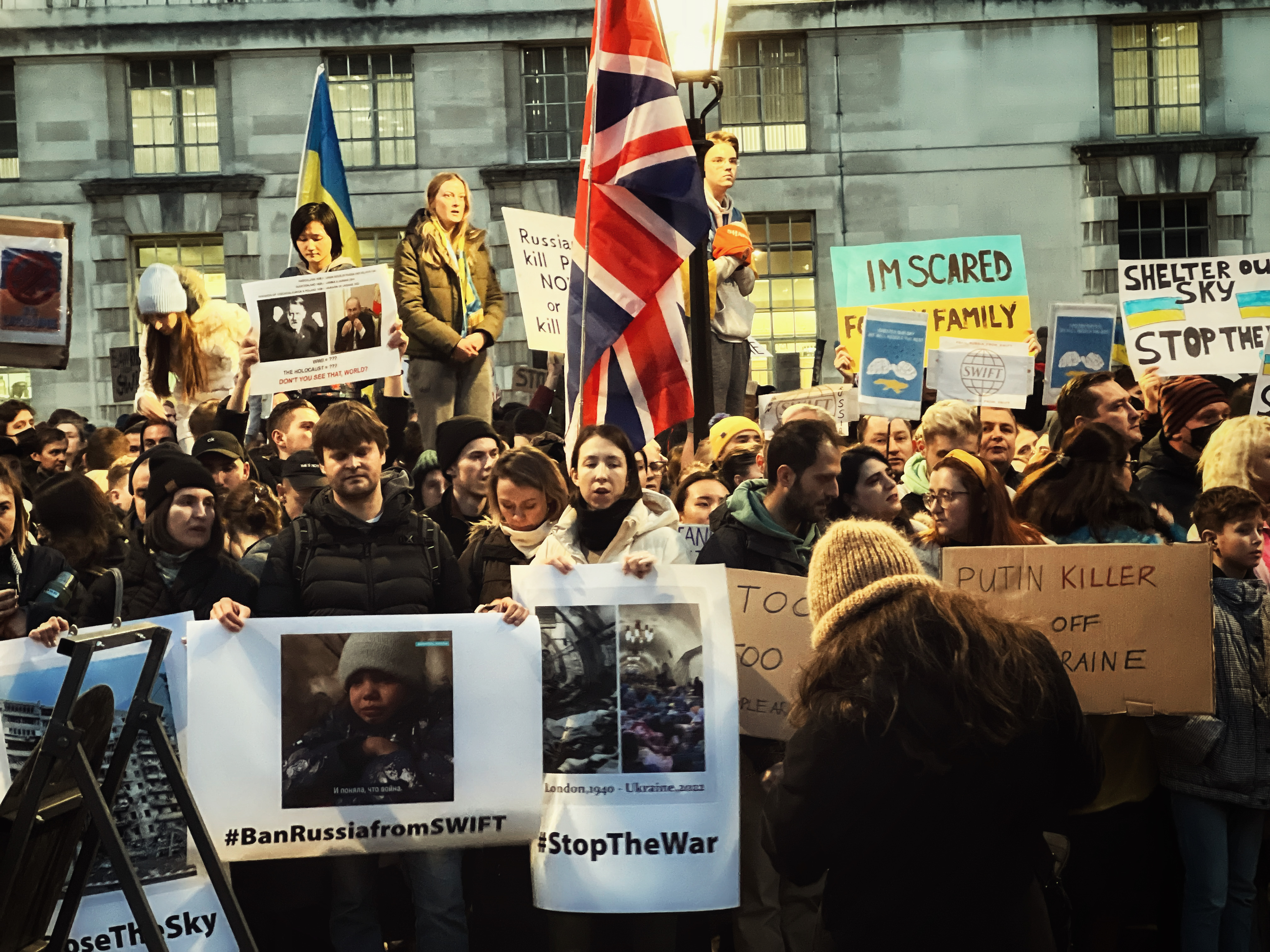
Anti-war protest in London, United Kingdom, 27 February 2022.

Unable to protest at the Russian embassy in Tehran, Iranian protests took place at the Ukrainian embassy instead. Protests were also held in Amman, Bern, Hong Kong, Istanbul, Luxembourg City, Nicosia, Sydney, Tokyo, Ulaanbaatar, and Vienna. In Valencia, Venezuela, a group of students held a protest. On 25 February, climate activist Greta Thunberg protested outside the Russian embassy in Stockholm.

During a constitutional referendum vote, Belarusian protestors in Minsk chanted "No to war" at polling stations. According to Ministry of internal affairs of Belarus, 800 people were detained on that day. On 26 February, Ukrainians gathered at St. Nicholas Cathedral in Mapo District, Seoul, South Korea, praying for the peace of their motherland. After the prayer, they went out the church and raised the Ukrainian flag and protesting signs. In the next day, around 300 people, including Ukrainians living in South Korea and their supporters, protest against Russia's invasion near the Russian Embassy in Seoul. On 26 February there were mass protests held in Tallinn, Tartu, and Narva. Estonian Police and Border Guard Board estimated 30,000 people were participating in the protest in Tallinn at its peak. That was the largest protest in the country after 1991, when it restored its independence.

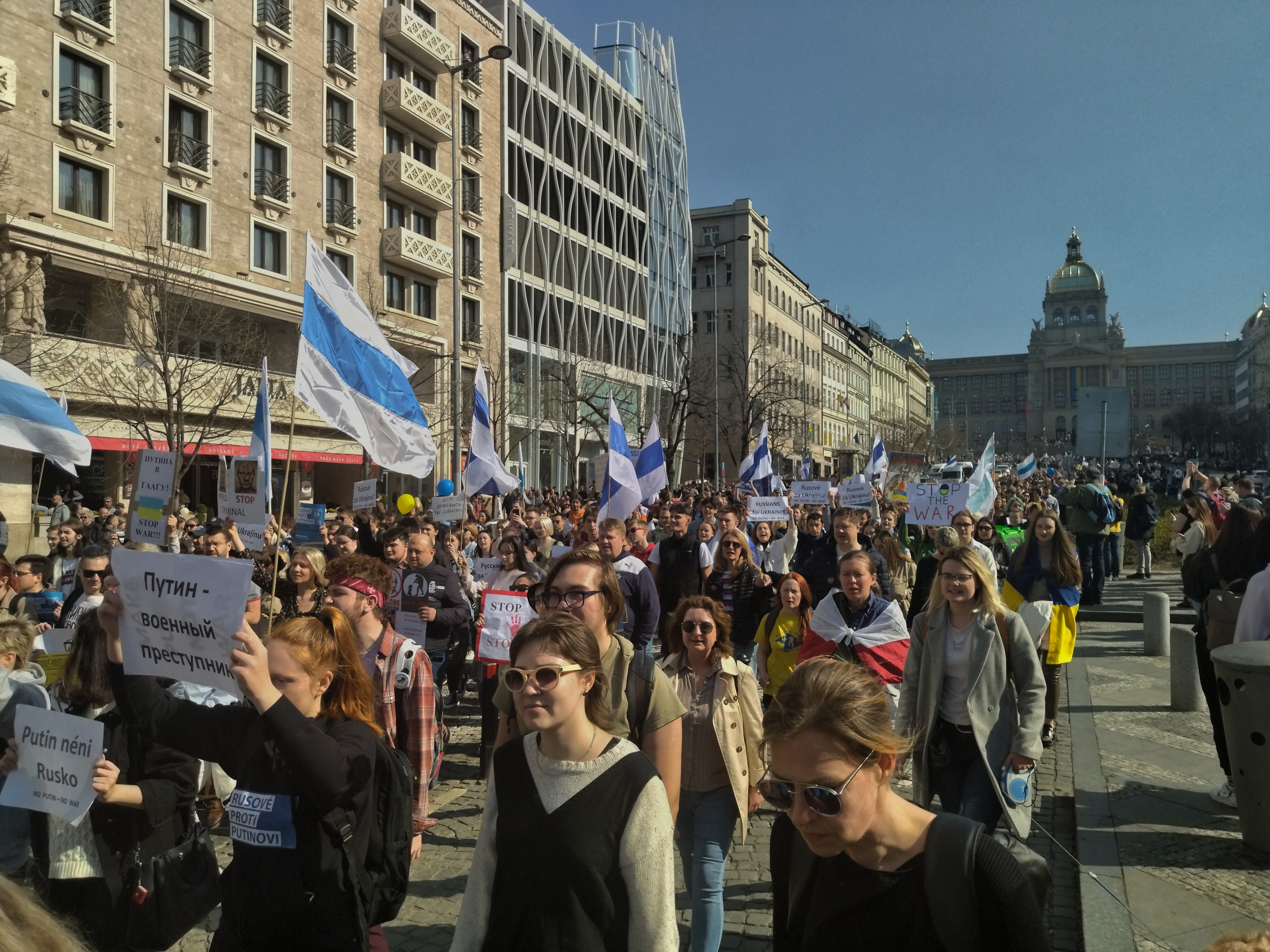
Protest by Russians living in the Czech Republic, 26 March 2022. The white-blue-white flag has been used by Russian anti-war protesters.

Protests in support of Ukraine were held worldwide. In Prague, about 80,000 people protested in Wenceslas Square.

On 26 February, several Freedom Convoy truckers in Chicago protested in solitary with Ukraine, against the invasion.

On 27 February, more than 100,000 gathered in Berlin to protest against Russia's invasion. During the 2022 Belarusian constitutional referendum, protestors in Minsk chanted "No to war" at polling stations. On 28 February, instead of the traditional Cologne Carnival parade, Rose Monday, which had been cancelled a few days earlier due to COVID-19, more than 250,000 (instead of the anticipated 30,000) gathered in Cologne in a peace march to protest against the Russian invasion; many protesters employed the slogan "Glory to Ukraine".

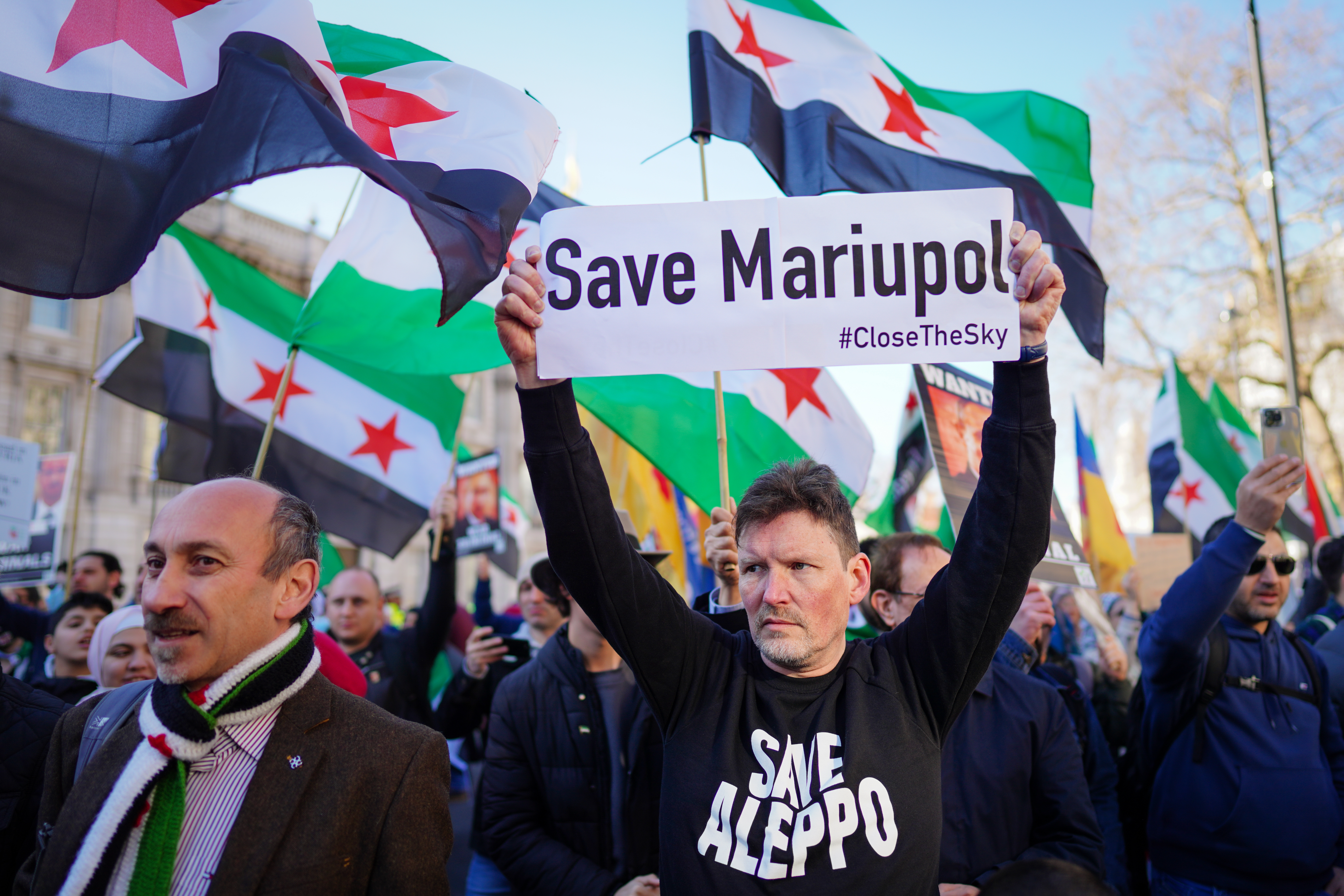
Demonstrations against Russian bombing of Mariupol by Syrian protestors in Central London, March 2022

As well as the protests, there were also reported instances of anti-Russian sentiment and discrimination against the Russian diaspora and Russian-speaking immigrants from post-Soviet states as a result of the war. In Germany, police recorded 383 anti-Russian offences as of April 2022. Some of the Russian-speaking population lodged a protest against "hatred and harassment", separate from but outnumbered by a concurrent pro-Ukraine couter-demonstration.

Several cities have changed names of streets, which influenced addresses of Russian Embassies:

- Oslo, Norway, Ukraine Square
- Ottawa, Canada, street signs in front of the Russian Embassy Free-Libre Ukraine Street
- Prague, Czech Republic, Ukrainian Heroes' Street
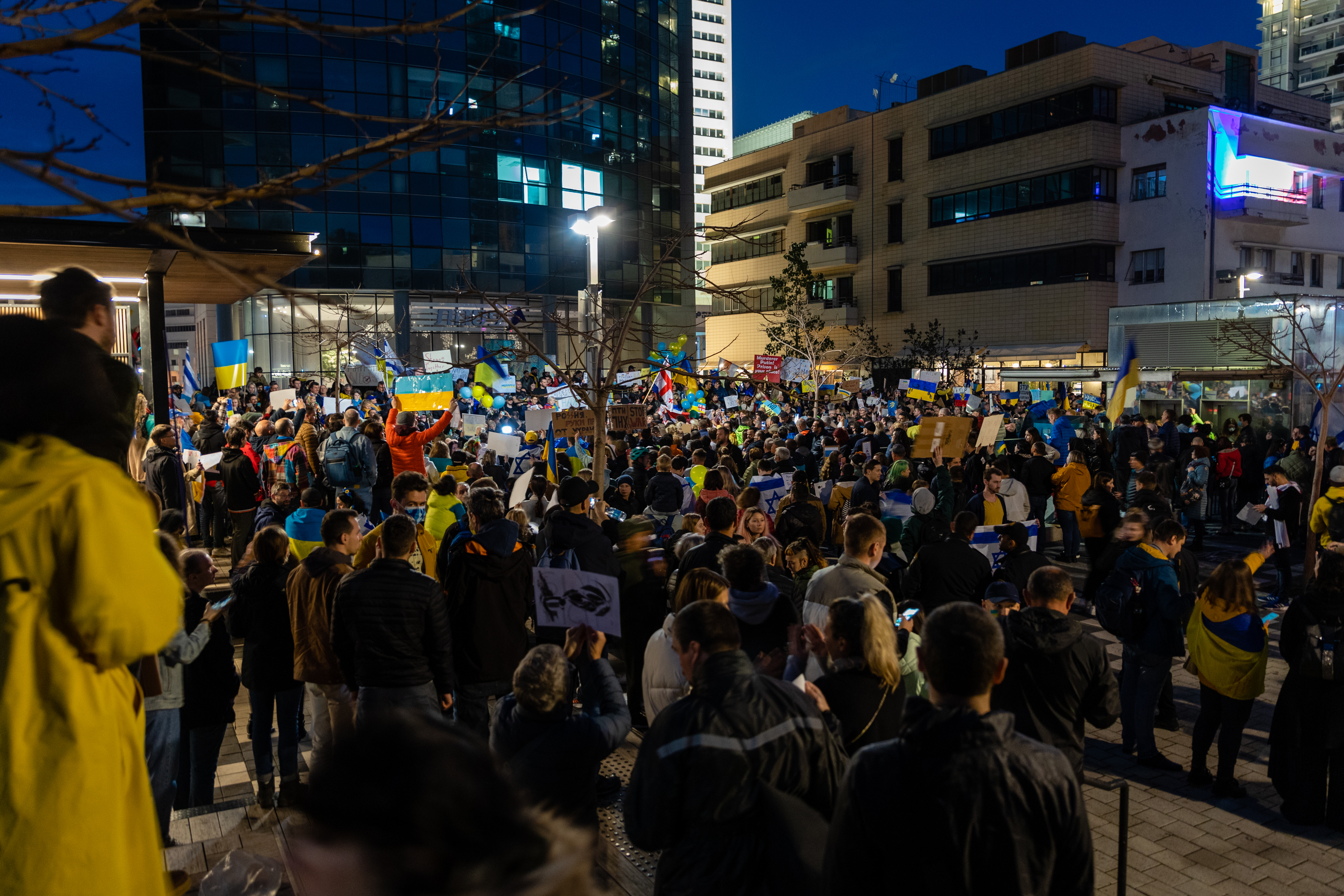
- Demonstration for Ukraine, Tel Aviv, Israel
  Reykjavík, Iceland, Kyiv Square
- Riga, Latvia, Ukrainian independence street
- Stockholm, Sweden, Free Ukraine Square
- Tirana, Albania, Free Ukraine Street
- Vilnius, Lithuania, Ukrainian Heroes' Street A near pond has been dyed red.

At the 2022 United Nations Climate Change Conference (COP27) in November 2022, Polish climate activists Dominika Lasota and Wiktoria Jędroszkowiak, and Ukrainian activists Svitlana Romanko, Valeria Bondarieva and Viktoriya Ball protested during a session held by Russians, whose 150-person delegation included 33 fuel lobbyists. The activists called out to the Russian delegation, stating that the Russians were war criminals who didn't have the right to be present at the conference and didn't deserve respect. Lasota called the Russians "despicable" (Polish: podłymi) and held up a banner "Fossil Fuels Kill". The activists were forced out by security personnel. Other people, including members of the Polish delegation and German climate activists, also left the room, leaving the Russians "nearly alone".

Justin Rowlatt of BBC News was also removed from the Russian session by security personnel after he asked the Russian delegation, "Do you plan to compensate for the damage made to the natural environment in Ukraine?".

=== Russian property ===
On 27 February, Taras Ostapchuk, a Ukrainian mechanic, appeared in Mallorcan court on charges of partially sinking the $7 million superyacht that he worked on. He stated that his boss ran a Russian state-owned supplies of military products and that he had gotten angry at the thought that his boss's company has supplied the missile that had struck a Kyiv apartment building that he had watched on his cellphone. Ostapchuk stated, "What do I need a job for if I don't have a country?", telling the court, "I don't regret anything I've done, and I would do it again."

On 14 March, a group called the London Maknovists, named after Ukrainian anarchist Nestor Makhno, announced they had reclaimed a Belgrave Square property in central London for Ukrainian refugees. The property is believed to be owned by Putin ally Oleg Deripaska, who was sanctioned by the UK government following the invasion. Multiple protestors hung banners off of the home's balcony and told reporters; "Michael Gove said oligarchs' homes should be expropriated to house Ukrainian refugees....We're doing the government's work for them..."

== Buildings lit up in the Ukrainian colours ==
Media related to Buildings illuminated in support of Ukraine during the 2022 Russian invasion of Ukraine at Wikimedia Commons

Several landmarks around the world were illuminated in the colours of the flag of Ukraine as a statement of solidarity.

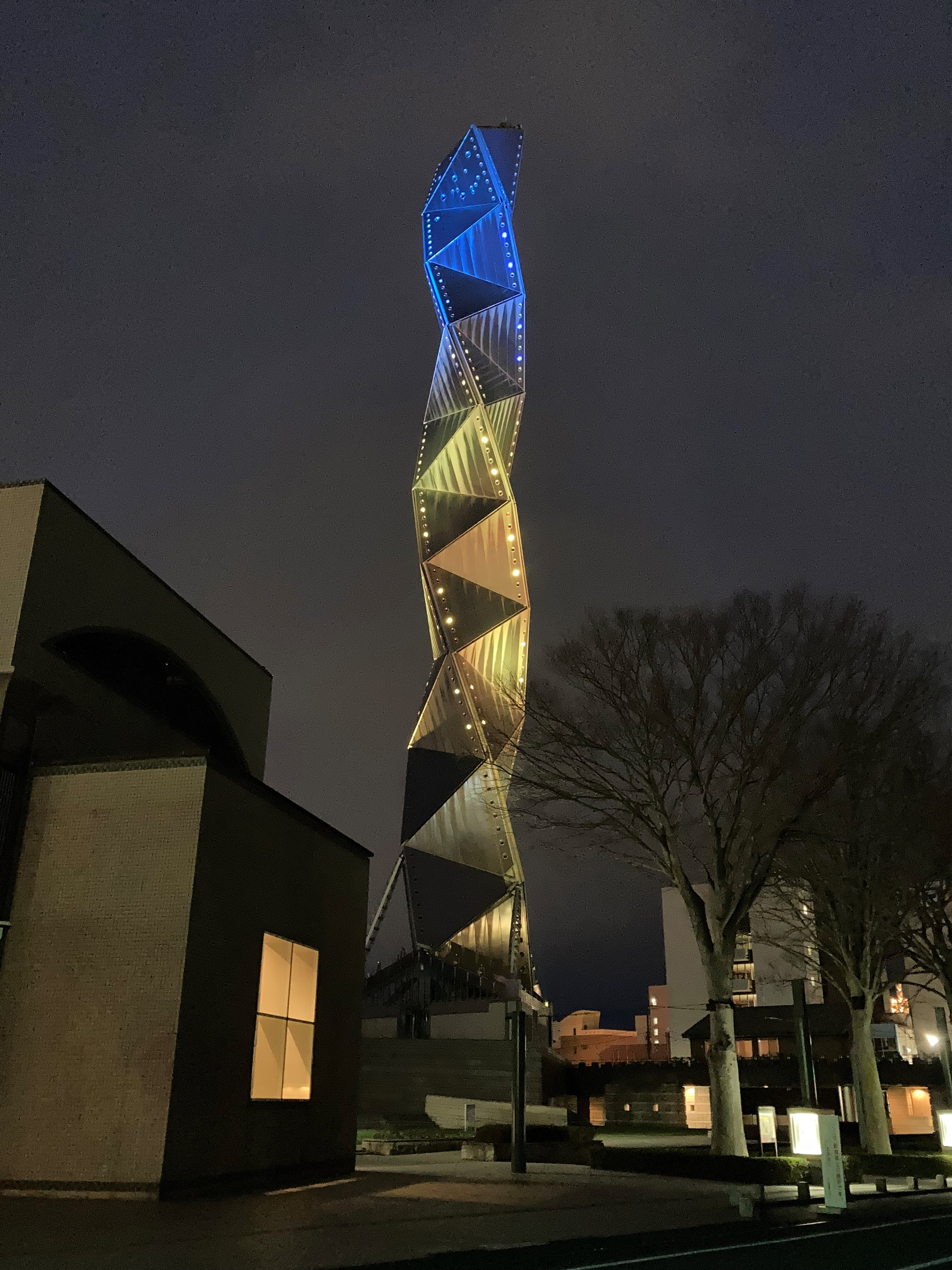
Art Tower Mito in Ibaraki, Japan

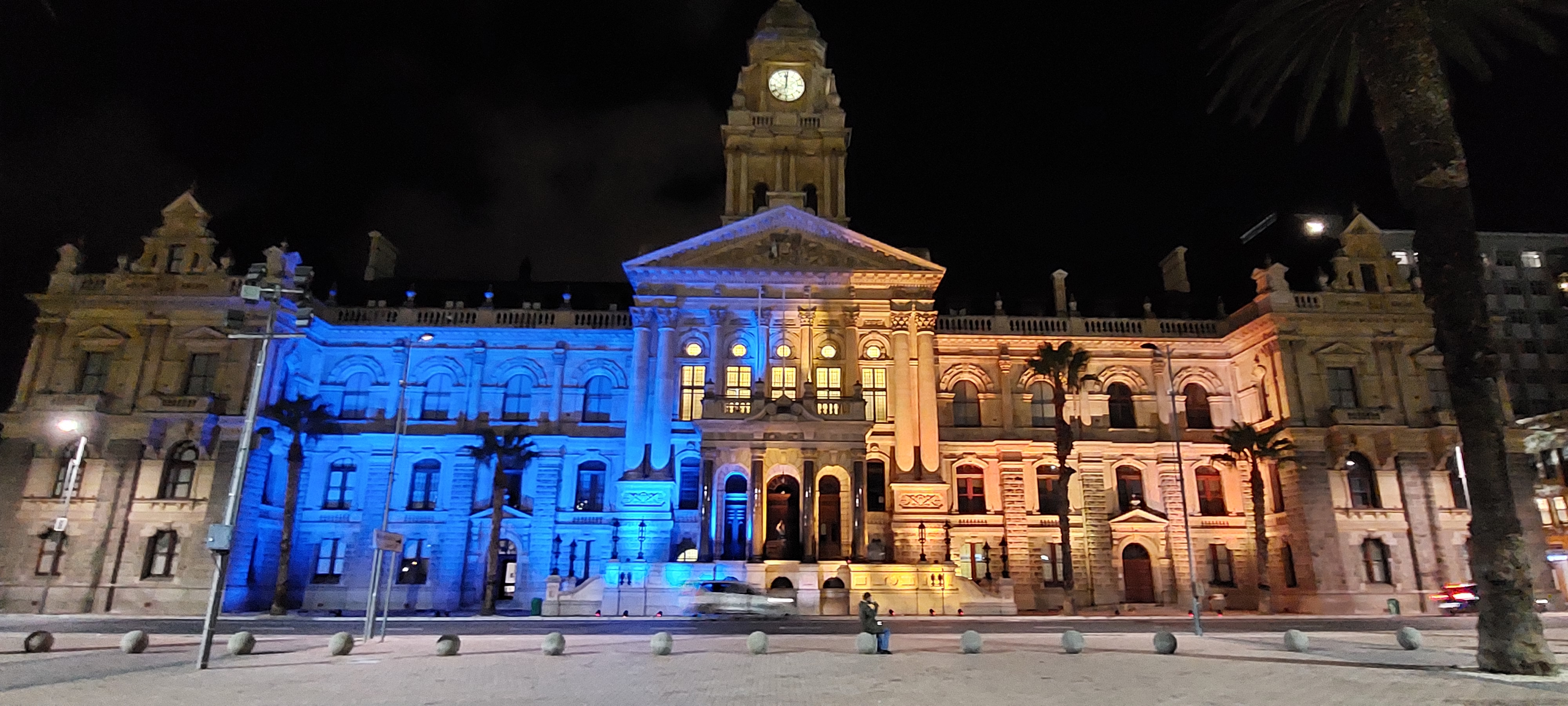
Cape Town City Hall in Cape Town, South Africa

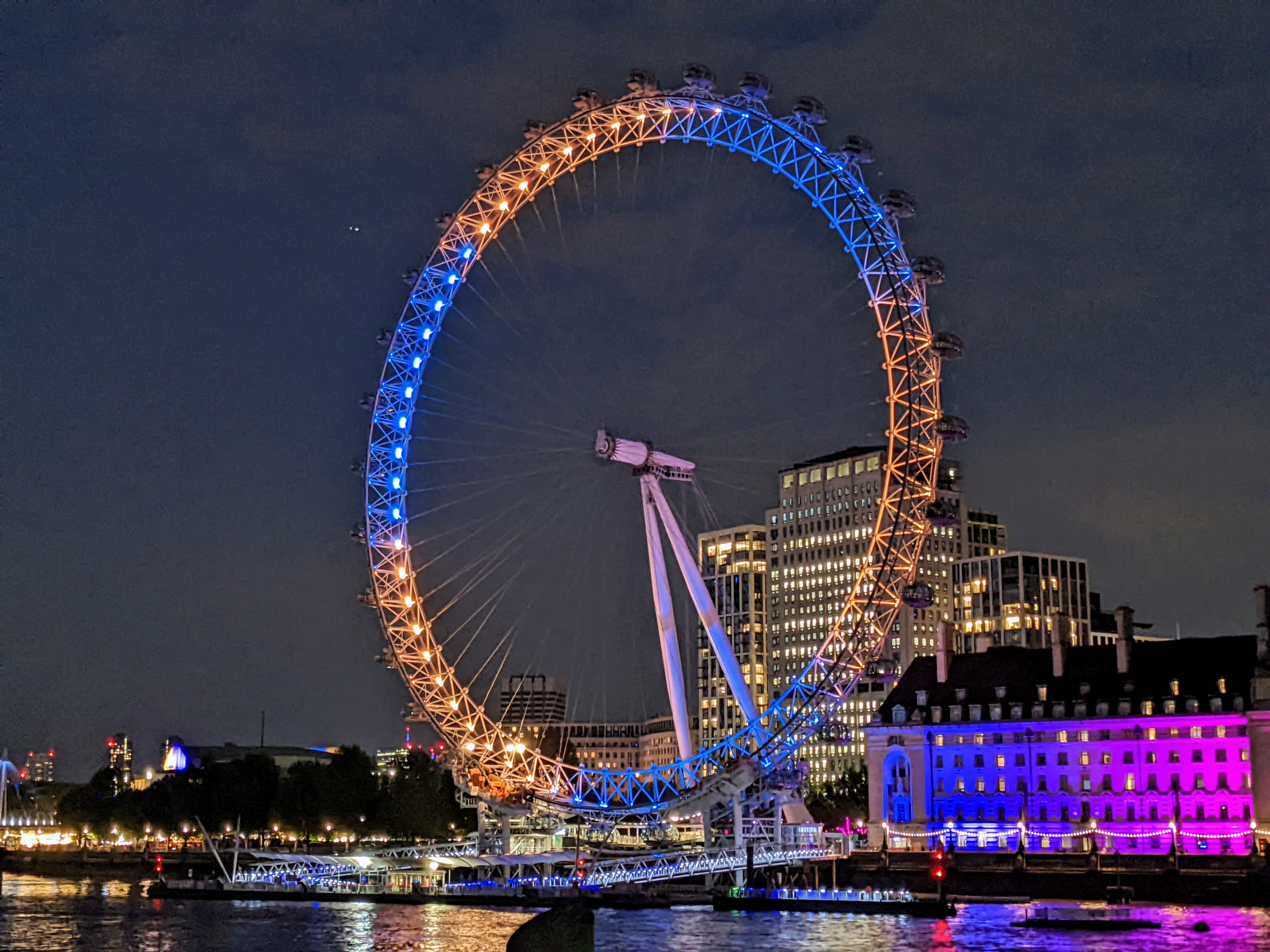
London Eye in London, United Kingdom

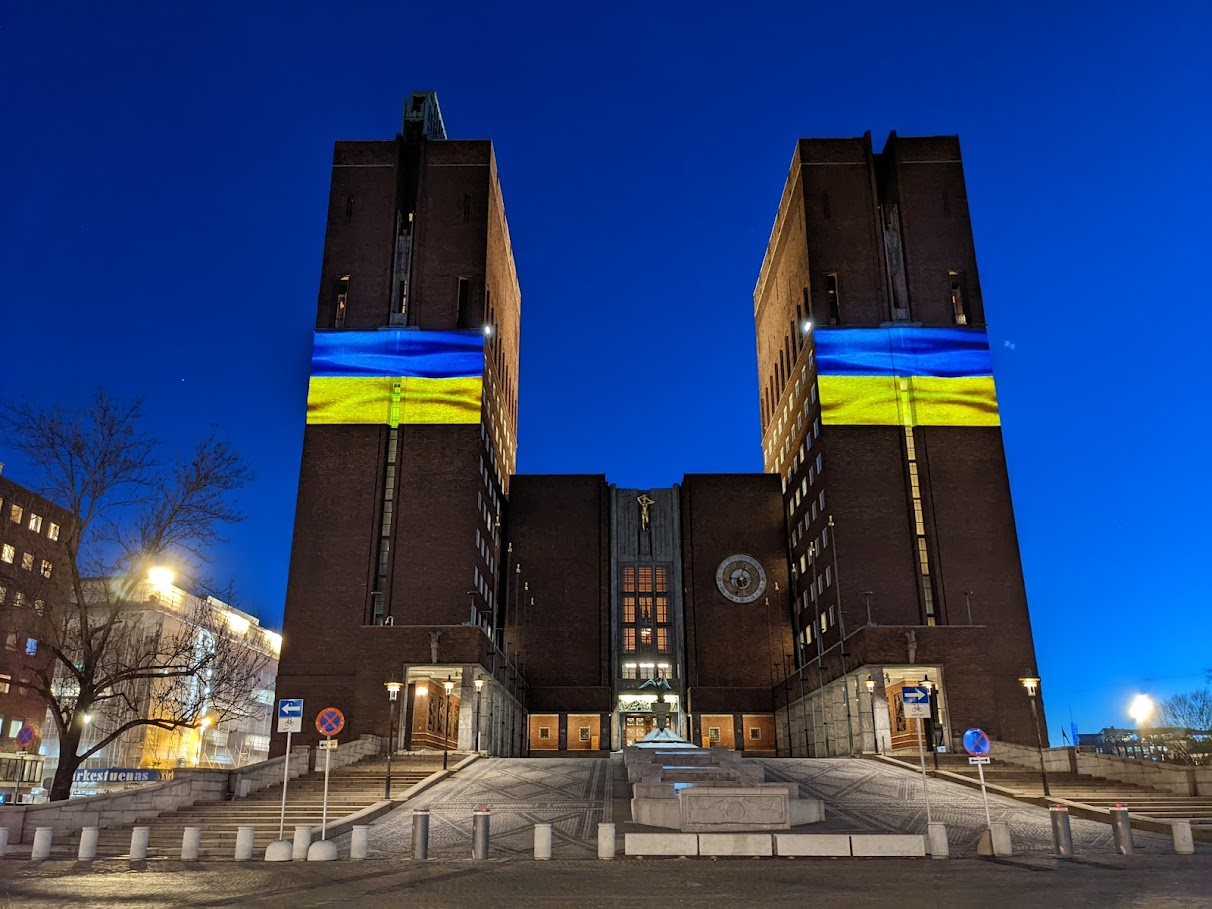
Oslo City Hall in Oslo, Norway

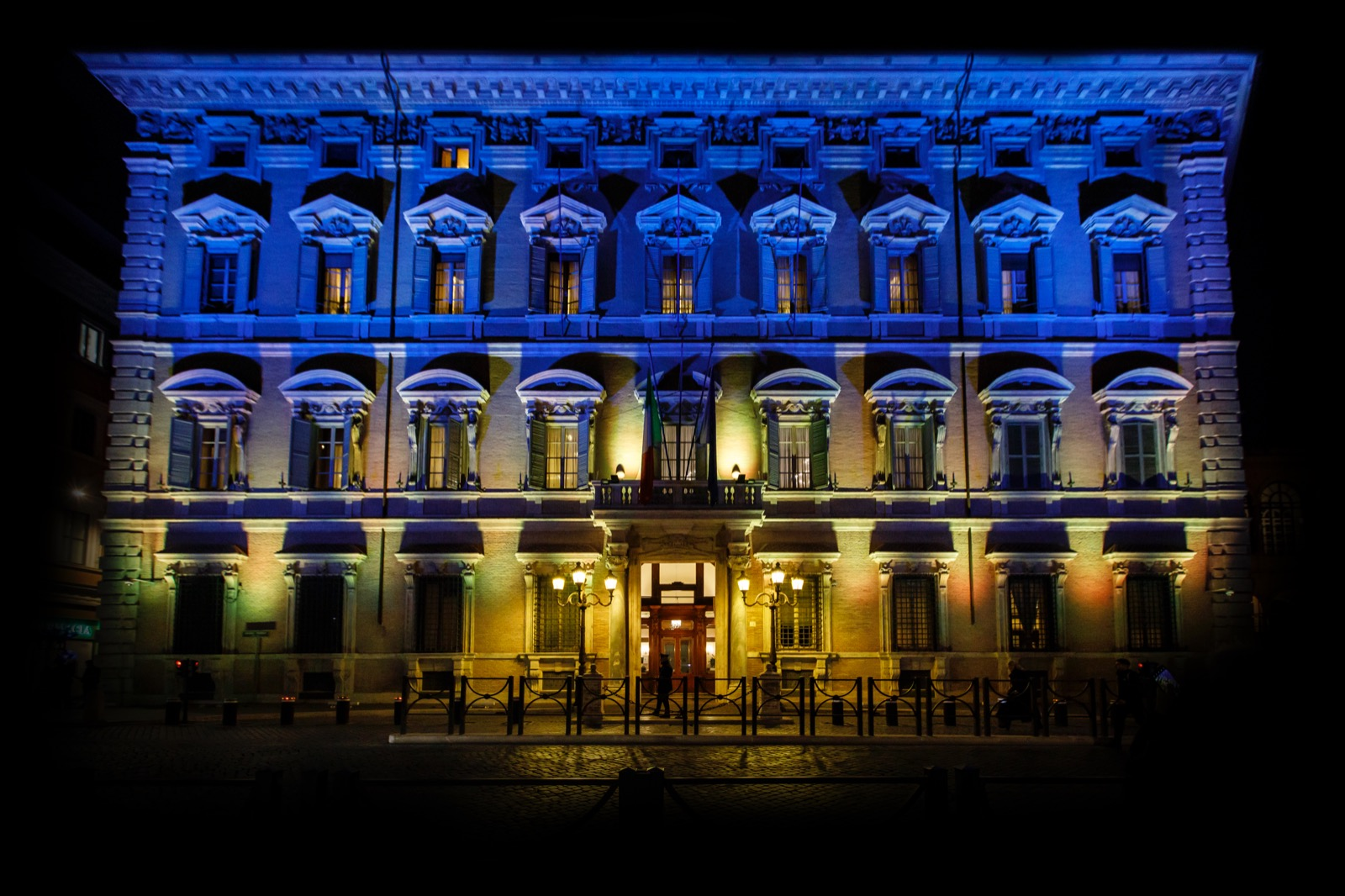
Palazzo Madama in Rome, Italy

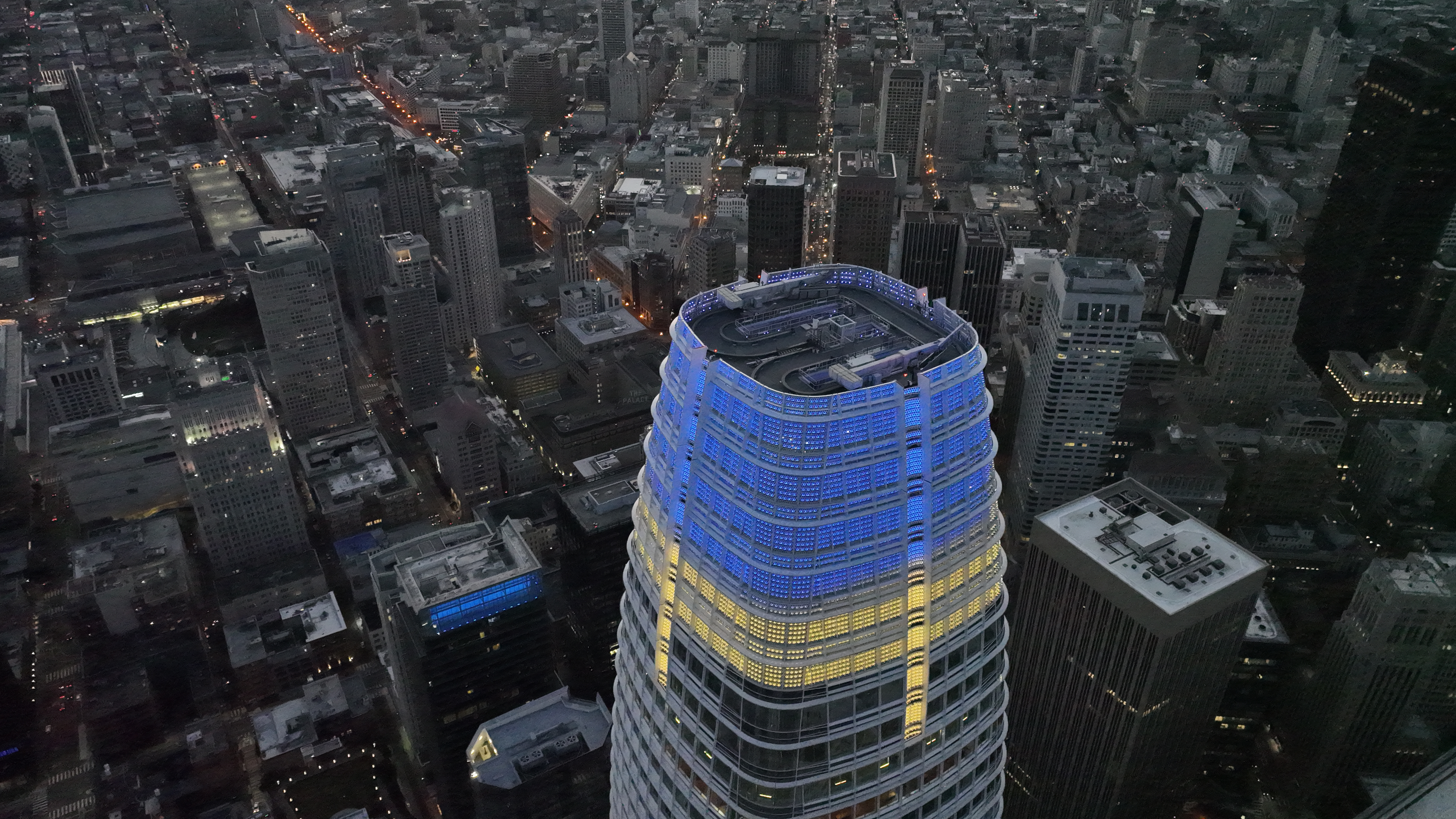
Salesforce Tower in San Francisco, United States

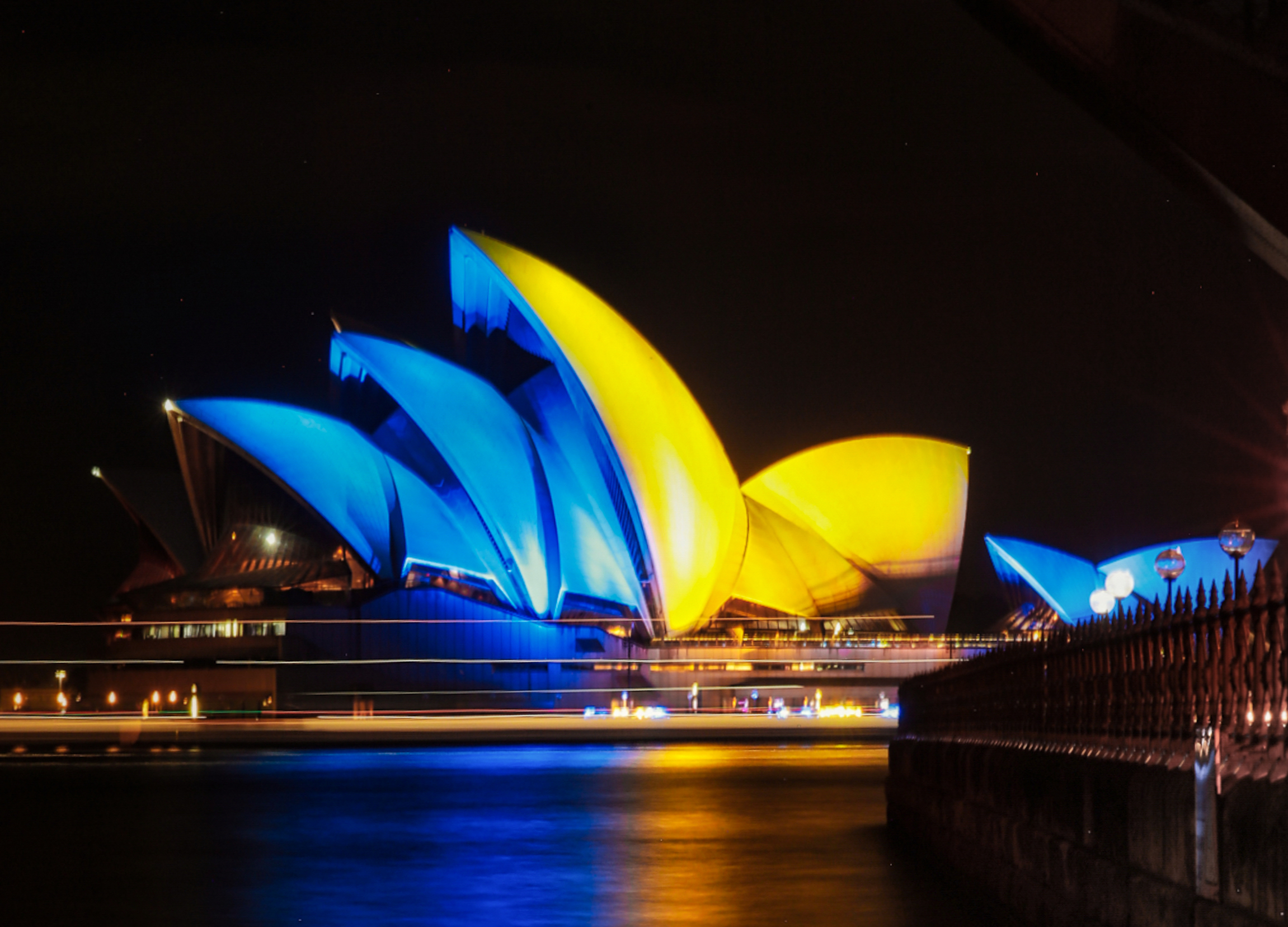
Sydney Opera House in Sydney, Australia

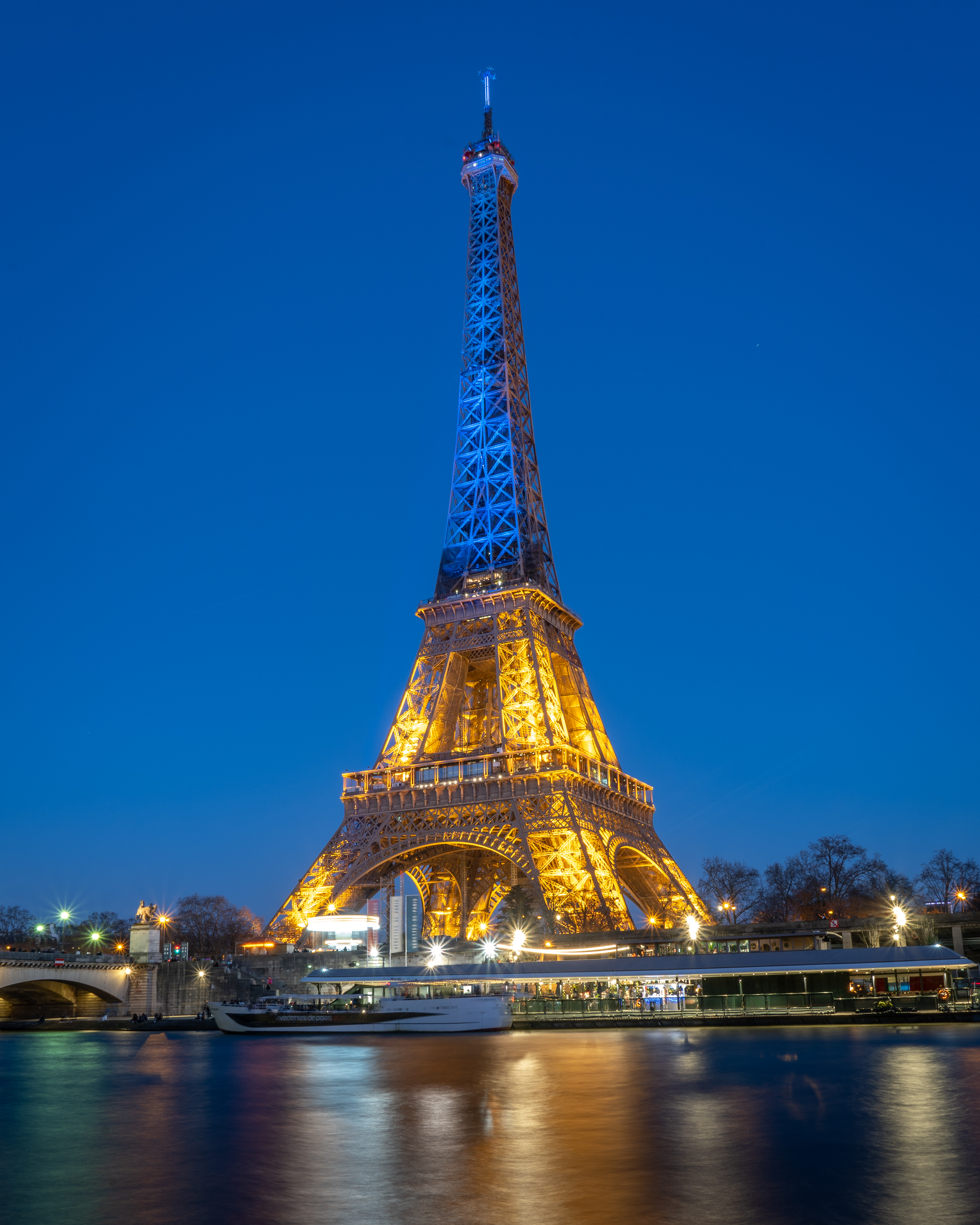
Eiffel Tower, Paris, France

== See also ==
- Boycott of Russia and Belarus
- Reactions to the Russian invasion of Ukraine
- Transnational repression by Russia
