= Dominika Lasota =

Polish climate justice activist (born 2001)

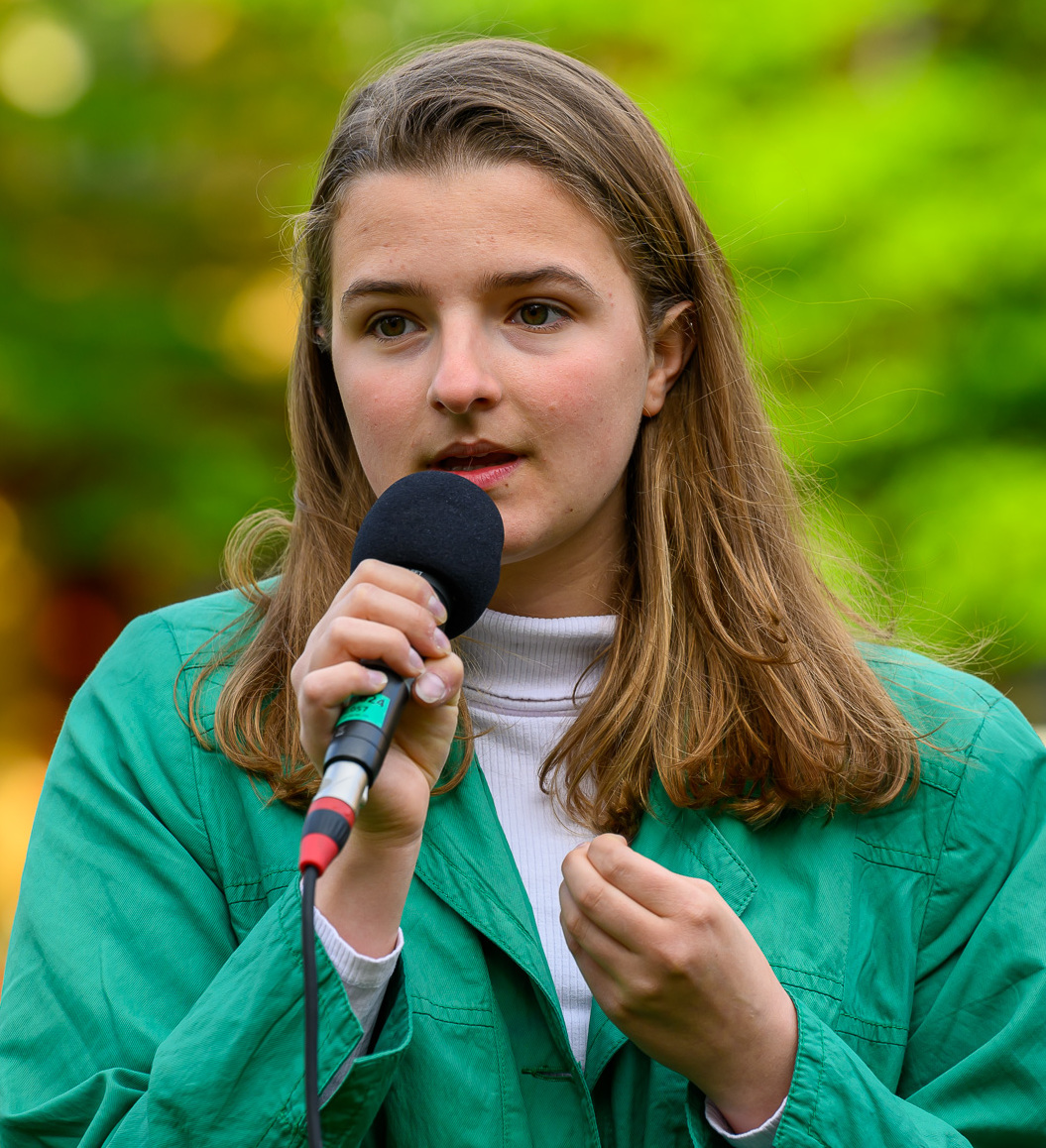
- Born: 26 November 2001
- Occupation: Climate activist

Dominika Lasota (born 26 November 2001) is a Polish climate justice activist. She is a founding member of the Polish Consultative Council.

== Childhood and education ==
Lasota was born on 26 November 2001. She attended Stonyhurst College in England for two years around 2018–2019, thanks to a scholarship from Towarzystwo Szkół Zjednoczonego Świata, and participated in youth camps in the United States.

== Climate activism ==
=== School Strike for Climate ===
Lasota is an activist in the School Strike for Climate (aka Fridays for Future) movement in Poland and active in campaigning on European climate law and for a just transition.

=== Climate activism in Poland ===
==== Protests ====
On 15 June 2020, Lasota was one of the activists holding a happening in front of the Chancellery of the Prime Minister of Poland to pressure the Polish government on climate crisis issues in the 19 June 2020 European Council meeting. Lasota argued that since scientists' advice was listened to during the COVID-19 pandemic, the advice of scientists in the IPCC assessments and special reports should also be listened to.

In an August 2020 protest in front of the Ministry for State Assets, led by minister Jacek Sasin, Lasota stated that politicians excluded ordinary people from decision-making in relation to the climate crisis, instead favouring the Polish coal lobby.

During a protest in September 2020 in Bydgoszcz, she argued that the climate crisis affected poorer people more than richer people, sincer poorer people are less able to protect their houses from hurricanes and floods. She stated that effects of the climate crisis felt in Poland included the April 2020 forest fires in Biebrza National Park and farmers' losses due to drought.

==== Renewable energy ====
In July 2022, together with atmospheric physicist Szymon Malinowski and climatologist Bogdan Chojnicki, Lasota argued on TVN24 in favour of renewable energy and accused politicians of being linked to industry responsible for the increased occurrence of droughts in Poland.

=== COP26 ===
She attended the November 2021 United Nations Climate Change Conference (COP26) in Glasgow. Together with other Fridays for Future activists she held a protest on 8 November prior to a speech by former US president Barack Obama, arguing that he had failed to fulfill his promise to provide US$100 billion in climate funding to developing countries. Lasota, Vanessa Nakate and Greta Thunberg met Nicola Sturgeon, First Minister of Scotland, during the conference. Psychology lecturer Yvonne Skipper interpreted Lasota and her colleagues' meeting with Sturgeon as having "a galvanising effect" of encouraging other young people to take action against the climate emergency.

=== 2022 Russian invasion of Ukraine ===
In March 2022, following the 2022 Russian invasion of Ukraine, Lasota and three other Fridays for Future activists met with European Commission president Ursula von der Leyen and discussed the aim of shifting from fossil fuels to renewable energy. In May 2022, at the end of a talk by French president Emmanuel Macron, Lasota and Wiktoria Jędroszkowiak confronted him verbally, arguing that stopping the purchase of fossil fuels from Russia would help to oppose the invasion of Ukraine. Video of the interaction spread virally. The New York Times interpreted the points of view of Lasota and Jędroszkowiak in relation to the invasion as introducing "a different brand of activist — young, mostly female and mostly from Eastern Europe — who believes that the Ukraine war is a brutal manifestation of the world's dependence on fossil fuels" and who "confront Europe's leaders face to face".

In May 2022, Lasota and other activists held a protest in front of the European Commission Berlaymont building during a meeting of EU leaders discussing Russia-related sanctions.

=== COP27 ===
Lasota attended COP27 in November 2022. She met Ursula von der Leyen again, arguing that no new investments in fossil fuels were justified, neither in response to the Russian invasion of Ukraine, nor to the crisis in energy costs, nor to the climate crisis.

On 8 November, Lasota briefly talked with Polish president Andrzej Duda on whether the government was sufficiently active in relation to the climate crisis. Lasota's talk with Duda was seen by Polish media as the most important event of COP27 on 8 November. Lasota stated to a TVN24 journalist that laws relating to the use of fossil fuels were passed easily in Poland while a law relating to wind turbines appeared to have been blocked, with the effect of delaying the development of clean energy in Poland. Lasota described Duda's response to her question as "a lie and a climate foul (Polish: przewinienie), since sticking to the illusory belief and promise that we can continue with coal in today's times is scandalous". Paulina Sobiesiak-Penszko of the Polish Institute of Public Affairs described Duda as an "old white m[a]n" who treated Lasota disrespectfully in their COP27 discussion.

On 15 November, together with Jędroszkowiak and Ukrainian activists, Lasota protested during a session held by Russians, whose 150-person delegation at COP27 included 33 fuel lobbyists. The activists called out to the Russian delegation that the Russians were war criminals who didn't have the right to be present at the conference and didn't deserve respect. Lasota held up a banner "Fossil Fuels Kill" facing the Russian delegates. Lasota and the other activists were forced out by security personnel, and others, including members of the Polish delegation and German climate activists, also left the room.

Lasota and Jędroszkowiak described COP27 as being to a large extent a greenwashing operation run in an authoritarian way. They called for support for the Fossil Fuel Non-Proliferation Treaty Initiative.

== Media attention ==
The New York Times described her as characterising a "new brand of activist" in linking climate activism with opposition to the Russian invasion. Lasota was described by the Polish Institute of Public Affairs in 2022 as "the face of the Polish climate action movement", and by Deutsche Welle as "the main organizer of climate strikes in Poland". Glasgow newspaper The Herald described Lasota, Thunberg and Nakate as leaders in limiting global warming.

== Consultative Council ==
Lasota was chosen as one of the founding members of the Consultative Council created on 1 November 2020 in the context of the October 2020 Polish protests, as a contact with the School strike for climate movement.
