= Nepalis in Russia =

Nepali diaspora in Russia

Total population
- 1,000 (2009)

Regions with significant populations
- Moscow · Russian Far East

Languages
- Russian · Nepali

Religion
- Hinduism · Buddhism

Related ethnic groups
- Nepali people

Nepalis in Russia comprises residents from Nepal in Russia, including temporary expatriates and permanent residents, as well as their locally born descendants.

== Migration history ==
Nepalese students moved to the then-Soviet Russia, as well as other countries that were part the former Soviet Union—particularly Kazakhstan and Kyrgyzstan. The USSR trained thousands of students from developing countries in a variety of fields. Over 6,000 Nepalis have graduated from Russian and former Soviet universities as lawyers, journalists, doctors and engineers.

Many of the students have married and settled there. After the fall of the Soviet Union, Nepalese entrepreneurs who settled down in Russia took the lead in investing in private hydropower projects and many other ventures in their home country.

== Notable people ==
- Anish Giri – chess prodigy

== See also ==
- Nepal–Russia relations
- Nepalese diaspora
- Immigration to Russia
