= Lilia Gildeeva =

Russian journalist

- Лилия Гильдеева
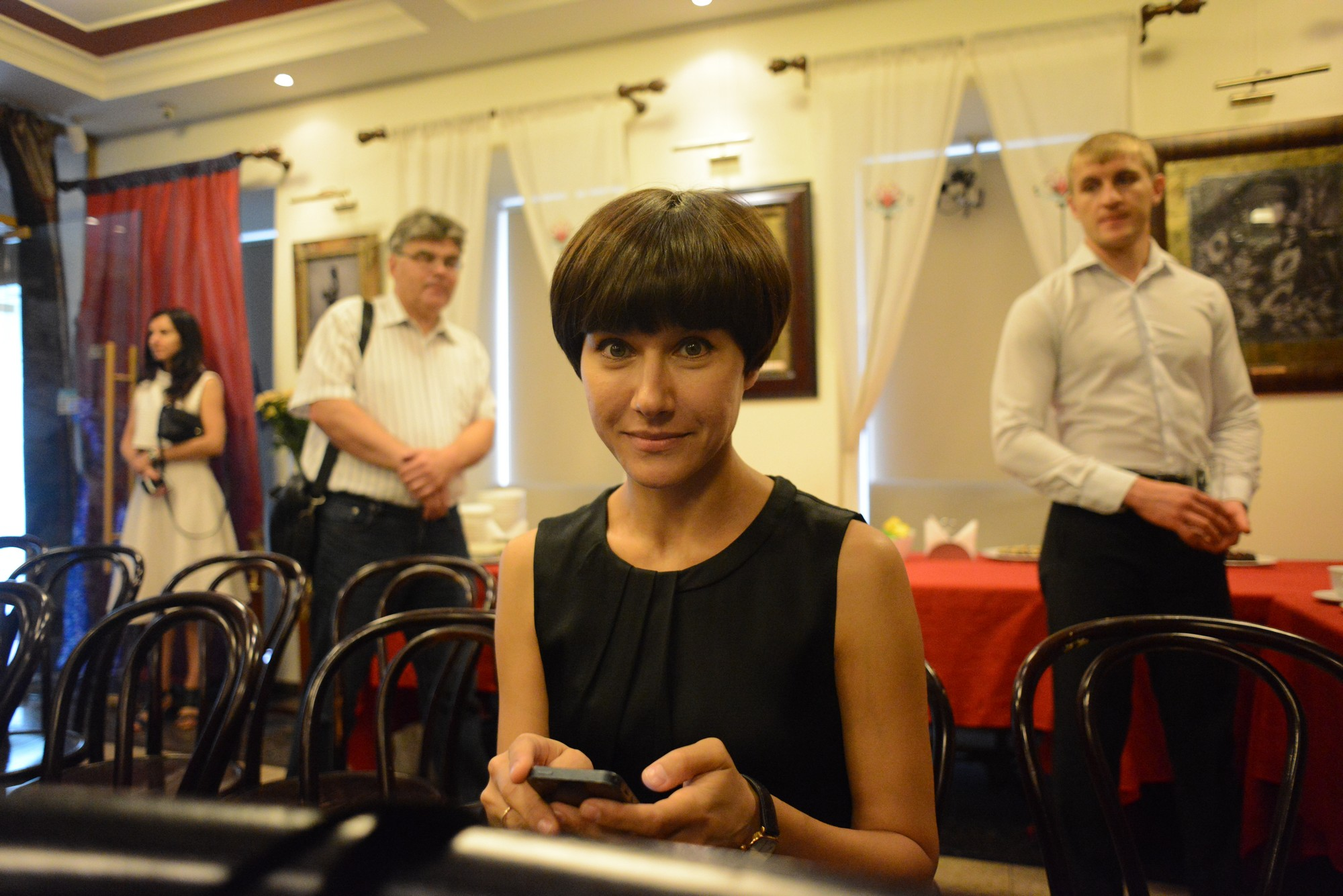
- Gildeeva in 2014
- Born: June 14, 1976 (age 50); Zainsk, USSR
- Occupation: journalist

Lilia Faridovna Gildeeva (Tatar: Лилия́ Фәри́т кызы Гилди́ева, romanized: Liliä́ Färít qızı Gildíyeva; born June 14, 1976) is a Russian journalist who worked for the NTV news program Segodnya from 2006 to 2022. She is famous for joking on air with her partner and colleague Alexey Pivovarov.

She was born in Zainsk, Republic of Tatarstan. She studied at Kazan State University and began her career as a TV journalist in Naberezhnye Chelny.

== Biography ==
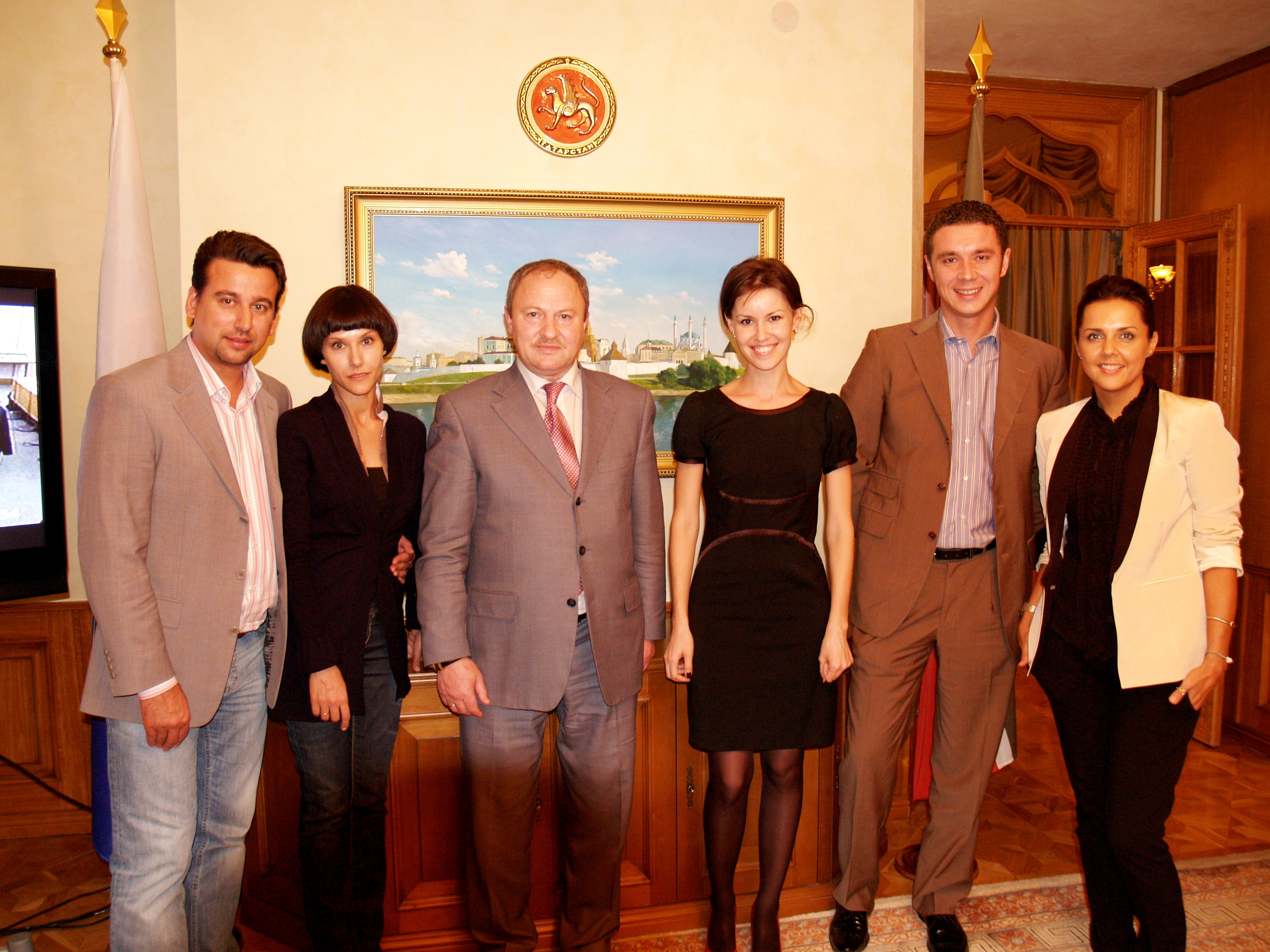
Gildeeva in 2010 (second to the left)

Lilia Gildeeva was born in a Tatar family. Her father was a public officer and her mother was a lower school teacher.

She got a degree in philology from the Kazan Federal University, where she studied from 1993 to 1997. Gildeeva started her career as a TV journalist in the city of Naberezhnye Chelny in July 1997 on the local TV channel "Efir" as a news reporter. In the month of August 1999 she moved to Kazan where Lilia Gildeeva worked as a reporter, producer and editor on the regional partner of the REN TV - "Variant". From 2002 to 2006 she worked for multi-language (Russian and Tatar languages) satellite TNV channel, where she worked as a news anchor for the program "News of Tatarstan" with an 8-month break while working as a spokesman in the KAMAZ firm. In 2006 Gildeeva was invited to work on the NTV channel as a news anchor for the program "Segodnya" (Today) at 19:00 with Alexey Pivovarov.

From the middle of October 2009 she was on maternity leave, but then returned on 4 January 2010.

From 2013–2015, Gildeeva worked as a news anchor for the evening news program "Segodnya" (Today) with Igor Poletaev and Alexander Yakovenko. From 23 March until 28 August 2015, she worked in pair with Mikhail Chabonenko. She also worked in pair with Vasiliy Maksimenko and Vladimir Chernyshev.

From June 2007 to August 2014, she also hosted the programs "Сегодня в 22:45 (then at 22:40, 23:00 and 23:15)" and Сегодня. Итоги (Today. Summary.)

In February 2022 she resigned from NTV, having previously left Russia for another country, which became known on March 15, 2022.

== Family ==
Married to Rustem who first worked as an editor for the TV channel and then in a car service centre. She has two children: son Danila (a student), and daughter Maya (born in 2009).

== Awards ==
- A commendation from the President of the Russian Federation (July 26, 2021) - "for services in the development of the media and many years of conscientious work".
- Acknowledgement of the President of the Russian Federation (April 23, 2008) - "for information support and active public activity on the development of civil society in the Russian Federation".
