= Nakate =

Nakate is a surname. Notable people with the surname include:

- Lillian Nakate (born 1978), Ugandan civil engineer and politician
- Vanessa Nakate (born 1996), Ugandan climate activist
