= Nepal–Russia relations =

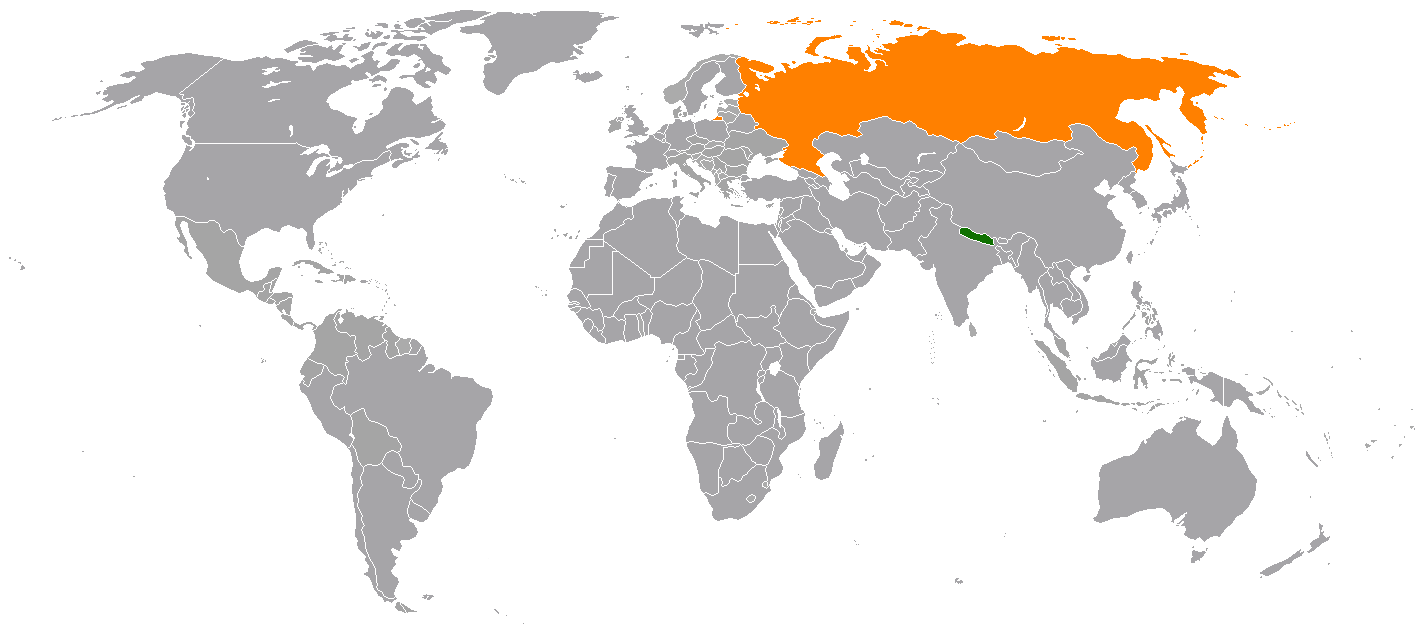
- Nepal: Russia

Nepal–Russia relations (Russian: Российско-непальские отношения, Nepali: नेपाल रुस सम्बन्ध) are the bilateral relations between Russia and Nepal.

== Background ==
Nepal and the Soviet Union had established diplomatic relations on June 5 - July 9, 1956. In April 1959, the countries signed several agreements, including the ones on economic and technical aid (foresaw free assistance in the construction of a hydroelectric power station with a power line, a sugar mill, a cigarette factory, and assistance in conducting prospecting works for the construction of a highway), and on free aid to Nepal for the construction of a hospital. In 1964, the Soviet Union and Nepal signed an agreement on free aid for the construction of an agricultural machinery plant.

== Post-Soviet era ==
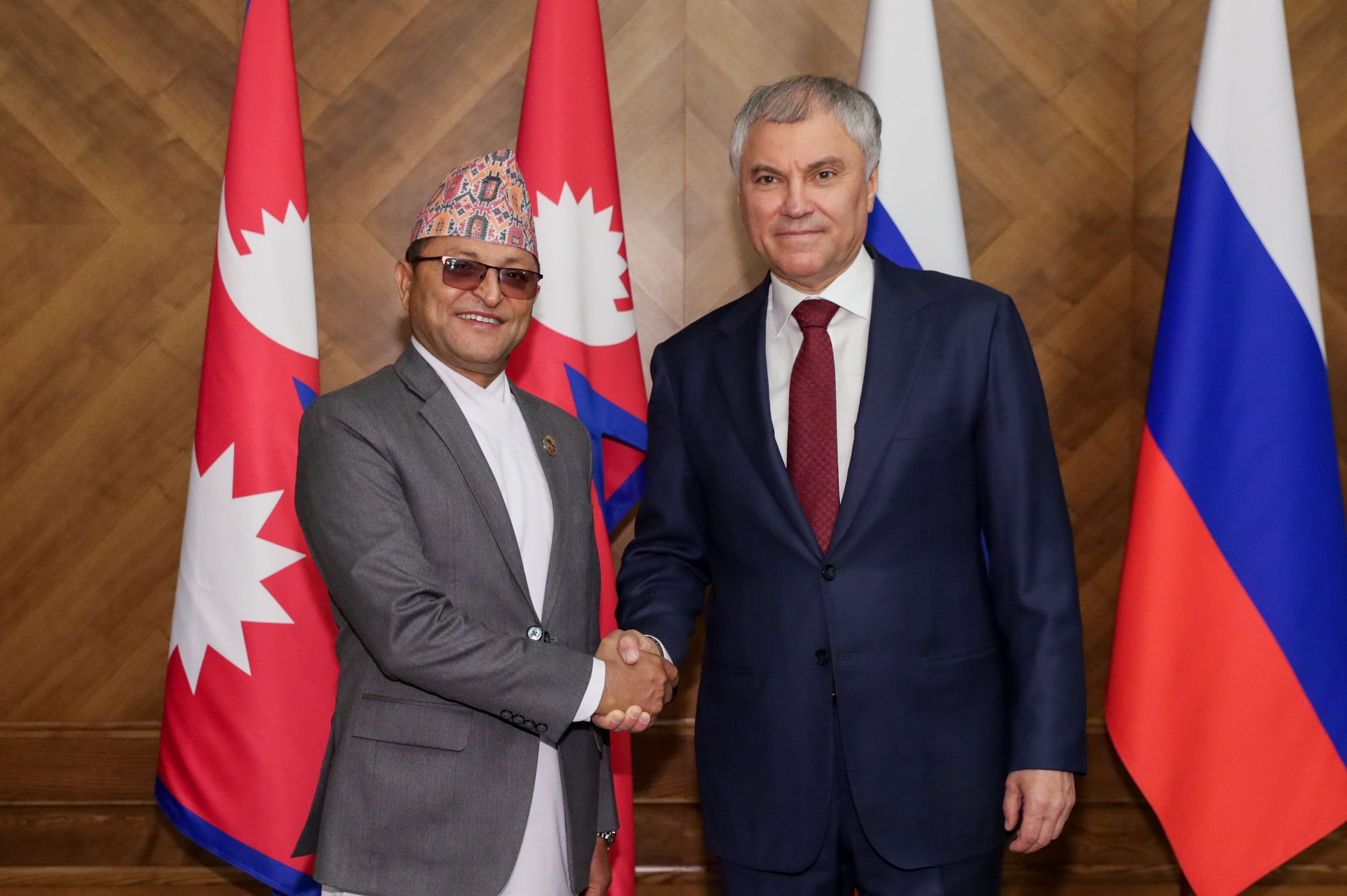
Ganesh Prasad Timilsina with Vladimir Putin's close associate Vyacheslav Volodin in Moscow, Russia, 21 April 2023

After the collapse of the Soviet Union, Nepal had extended full diplomatic recognition to the Russian Federation as its legal successor. Since then numerous bilateral meetings have taken place. Since 1992 numerous Nepalese students have gone to Russia for higher studies on a financial basis. In October 2005 the foreign ministers of both countries met to discuss cooperation on a variety of issues including political, economic, military, educational, and cultural. Both countries maintain embassies in each other's capitals. Russia has an embassy in Kathmandu while Nepal has an embassy in Moscow.

== See also ==
- List of ambassadors of Russia to Nepal
- List of ambassadors of Nepal to Russia
