= Embassy of Serbia, Moscow =

Diplomatic mission of Serbia in Russia

Coordinates: 55.7185°N 37.5189°E

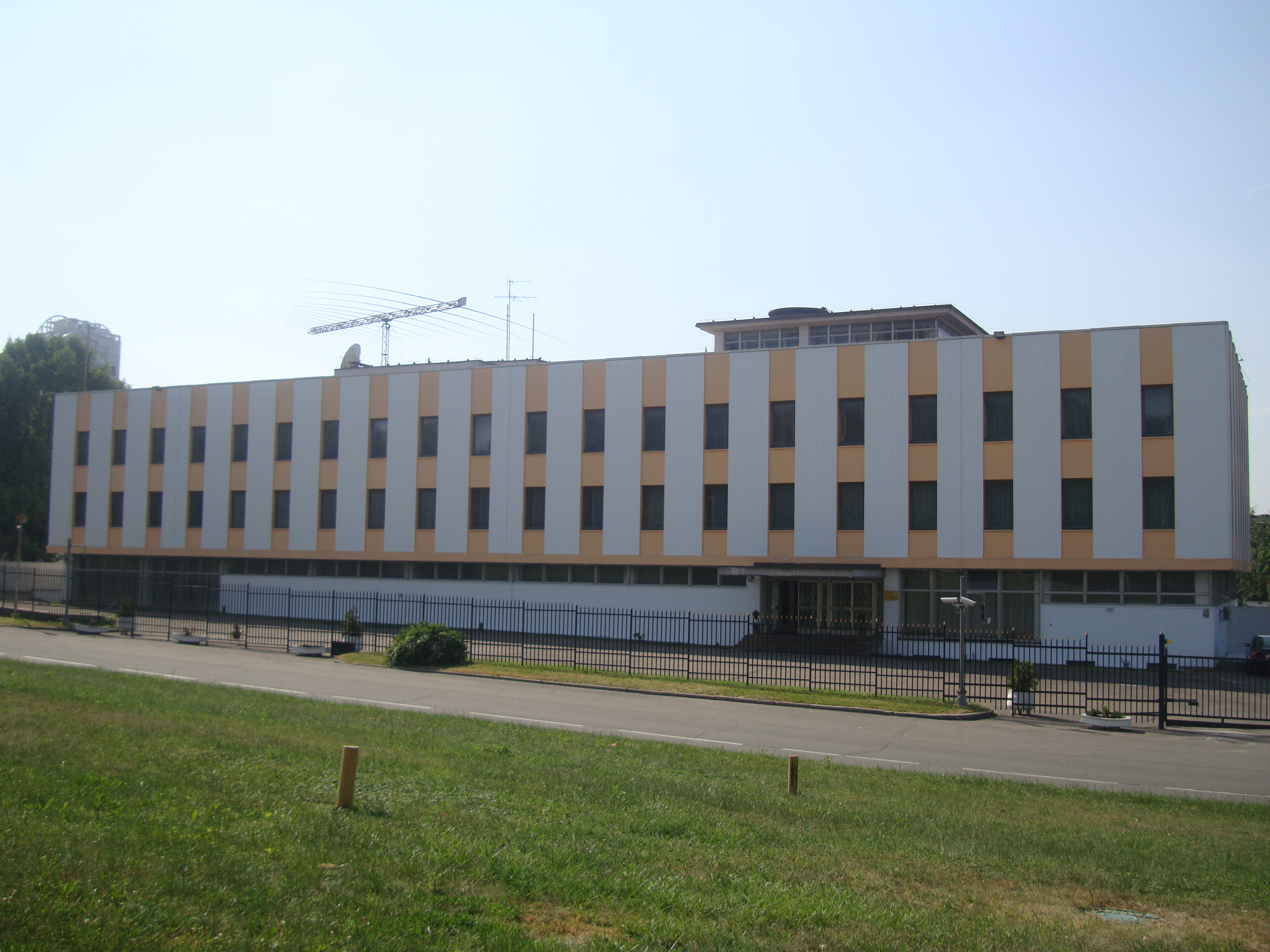
- Location: Moscow
- Ambassador: Momčilo Babić

The Embassy of Serbia in Moscow (Russian: Посольство Сербии в Москве, Serbian: Амбасада Србије у Москви) is the diplomatic mission of Serbia in Russia. It is located at 46 Mosfilmovskaya Street (Russian: Мосфильмовская ул., 46) in the Ramenki District of Moscow Current Ambassador of Serbia to Russia is Momčilo Babić.

In 2011, the embassy was attacked by National Bolshevik Party activists.

== See also ==
- Russia–Serbia relations
- Diplomatic missions in Russia
- Diplomatic missions of Serbia
