= Russia–Serbia relations =

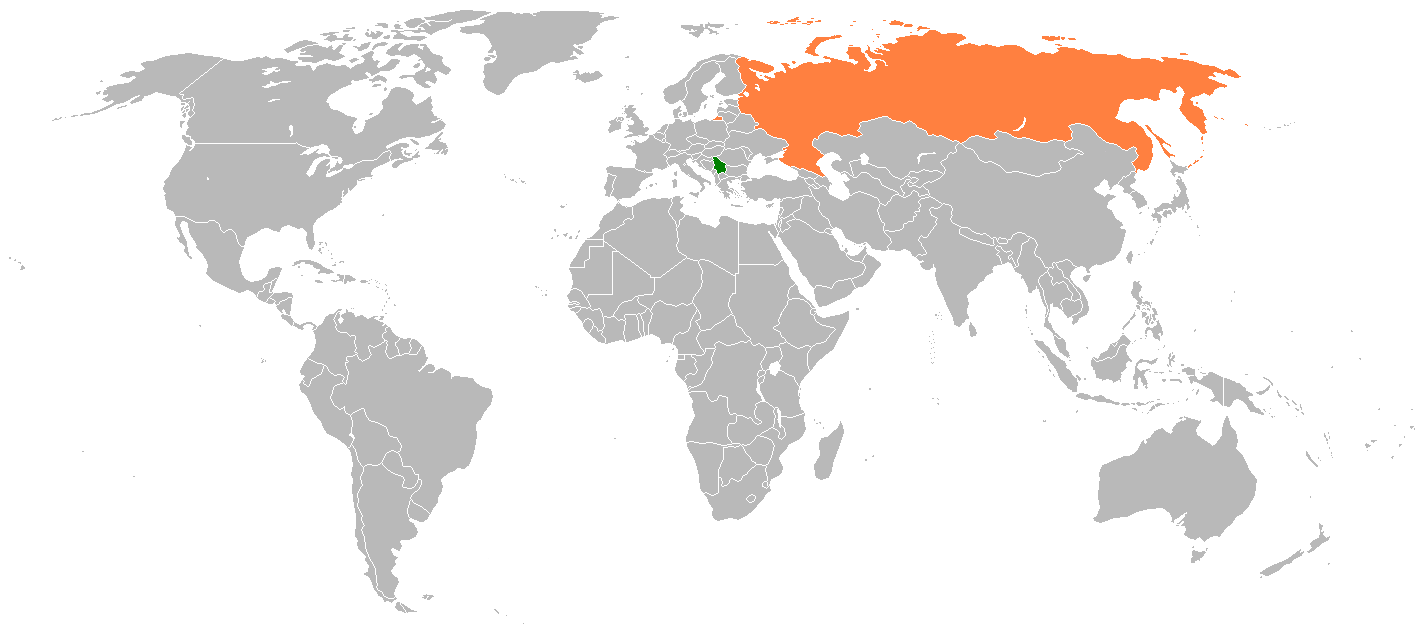
- Serbia: Russia

Diplomatic mission
- Embassy of Serbia, Moscow: Embassy of Russia, Belgrade

Envoy
- Momčilo Babić: Aleksandar Bocan-Harchenko

Russia and Serbia maintain diplomatic relations established in 1816 between the Russian Empire and the Principality of Serbia. The Soviet Union maintained relations with the Socialist Federal Republic of Yugoslavia until the dissolution and breakup of both countries in 1991. Russia (as the sole successor of the Soviet Union) established relations with the Federal Republic of Yugoslavia (later Serbia and Montenegro) of which Serbia is considered the sole successor.

The two nations are close geopolitical and military allies with their historical alliance spanning centuries. Through their shared Slavic heritage and Eastern Orthodox Christian faith, they support diverse bilateral cultural traditions. Economic activity between Russia and Serbia is maintained through regional free trade agreements and foreign investment.

== History ==
=== Middle Ages ===
After the Ottoman invasion of Serbia in the 14th century, Serbian refugees found refuge in Russia. Lazar the Serb and Pachomius the Serb were some of the notable Serbs in Russian medieval history. Elena Glinskaya, the mother of Russian emperor Ivan the Terrible, was maternally Serb. The Orthodox worship of Saint Sava was established in Russia in the 16th century.

=== 18th century ===
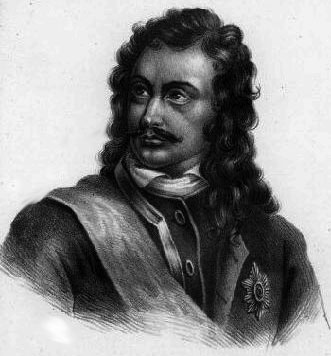
Sava Vladislavich, Serbian diplomat, advisor to the Russian Emperor Peter the Great

In the 1750s, in a re-settlement initiated by Austrian Colonel Ivan Horvat, a vast number of Orthodox Serbs, mostly from territories controlled by the Habsburg monarchy (the Serbian Grenzers), settled in Russia's military frontier region of New Serbia (with the centre in Novomyrhorod, mainly in the territory of the present-day Kirovohrad Oblast of Ukraine), as well as in Slavo-Serbia (now mainly the territory of the contested Luhansk Oblast). In 1764, both territorial entities were incorporated into Russia's Novorossiya Governorate.

=== 19th century ===
After the Ottoman Empire had allied itself with Napoleon in 1806 and was subsequently attacked by Russia and Great Britain, it sought to meet the demands of the Serbian rebels under Karađorđe. Konstantin Rodofinikin initially proposed that Serbia become a protectorate of the Russian Empire and that Russian garrisons be stationed in Serbia, as well as a high representative, which would oversee the affairs in the country. Karađorđe refused the proposition, claiming that it would turn Serbia into a Russian province. At the same time, the Russians offered the Serbs aid and cooperation. The Serbs accepted the Russians′ offer over autonomy under the Ottomans (as set by the "Ičko's Peace") and signed an alliance with the Russian Empire in 1807. Karađorđe was to receive arms and military and medical missions; nevertheless, the terms of the Russo-Turkish settlement agreed in 1812 effectively provided for Turkish re-occupation of Serbia, and the First Serbian Uprising was definitively suppressed in 1813. The Second Serbian Uprising achieved Serbian autonomy within the Ottoman Empire, which was internationally recognized through the Russo-Turkish Akkerman Convention and the Treaty of Adrianople. Serbia was thus put under Russian protection, although Russia was unable to exert control as it did in Wallachia and Moldavia, territories also dealt with at the Akkerman Convention. Serbian autonomy was briefly abolished by the Ottoman sultan in 1828, then re-granted in 1829. Russian protection was recognized until its abolition thereof in 1856, after the Russian defeat in the Crimean War. In 1838, then Prince of Serbia Miloš Obrenović received the first Russian consul, Gerasim Vashchenko.

In 1876, Serbia, along with the Principality of Montenegro, declared independence and war on the Ottoman Empire. The war eventually ended with Serbian victory in 1878, while Russia had been involved in its own war with Turkey, with the final settlement of both wars decided by the great powers at the Congress of Berlin. The Treaty of Berlin, whose deliberations and decisions were greatly influenced by Austria-Hungary′s Gyula Andrássy, recognized Serbia's independence, yet left Serbia's ruling class disgruntled at Russia, which was seen as favoring the newly established Principality of Bulgaria at the expense of Serbia. In line with Andrássy's idea that Austria-Hungary, in order to neutralise inimical irredentist tendencies, should establish close legally binding ties with all her neighbors, with whom she had ethnic connections, Austria-Hungary, which bordered Serbia to the north in modern-day Serbian Vojvodina), and the west in modern-day Bosnia and Herzegovina, sought to integrate Serbia economically by concluding a series of trade conventions with her and pressured Milan Obrenović to enter into a comprehensive bilateral political treaty. In June 1881, Obrenović and Austria-Hungary concluded a secret convention that effectively turned Serbia into Austria-Hungary's client state. In turn, Russia in the 1880s intensified her courtship of Montenegro.

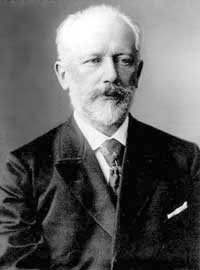
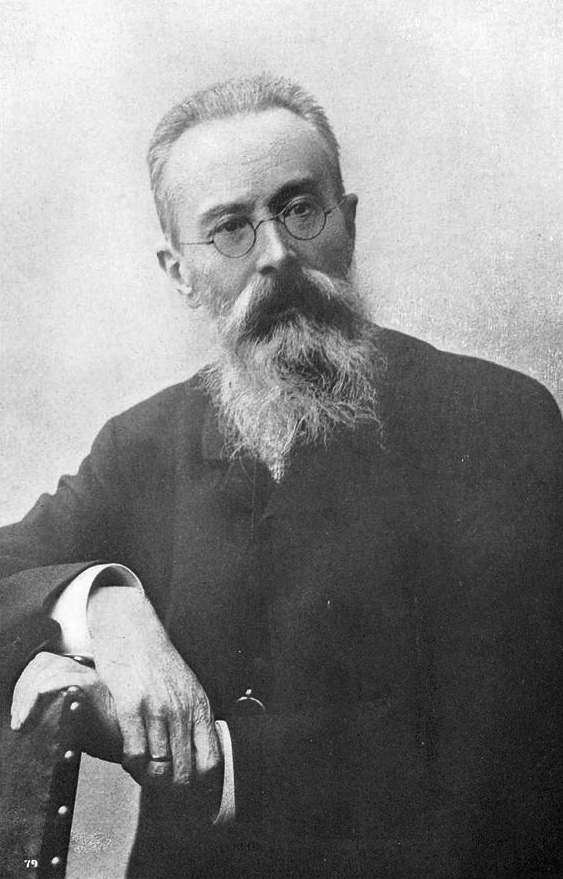
Left: Pyotr Ilyich Tchaikovsky composed the Serbo-Russian March
Right: Nikolai Rimsky-Korsakov composed the Fantasy on Serbian Themes

Serbia's People's Radical Party, founded by Nikola Pašić, gained parliament majority in 1891 and sought to free the country of Austro-Hungarian dependence. Serbia was defeated in the war with Bulgaria in 1885 and the Bulgarian unification was internationally recognized. Meanwhile, tensions between Serbia and Austria-Hungary grew. Serbian pretensions in creating a South Slavic state (Yugoslavism as opposed to Austro-Slavism) put fear in Austria-Hungary of the potential devastation of the Austro-Hungarian empire. On the other hand, Russia became increasingly disgruntled with Bulgaria, where the rulers of the German dynasties, Alexander of Battenberg and, from 1887, Ferdinand I of Bulgaria pursued policies that Russia opposed. The visit to Saint Petersburg of Austrian Emperor Franz Joseph and his conference with Nicholas II of Russia in 1897 brokered a secret agreement between the two empires to honor and seek to maintain the status quo in the Balkans, which was in line with Austria-Hungary's attempts to forestall an emergence of a large Slavic state in the region. The 1901 massacres of Serbs in Kosovo was instrumental in causing a diplomatic conflict between Austria-Hungary, which supported the Albanians, and Serbia, which was supported by Russia.

Serbian King Alexander I was assassinated in a coup d'état in 1903, which ushered in the end of the Obrenović dynasty and the return of the House of Karađorđević. The new political regime of Prime Minister Nikola Pašić under Peter I re-oriented Serbia towards Russia. Serbia was supported by Russia in the economic Pig War with Austria-Hungary. Austria-Hungary annexed Bosnia and Herzegovina in 1908; Russia did not interfere in the Bosnian crisis.

=== World War I ===
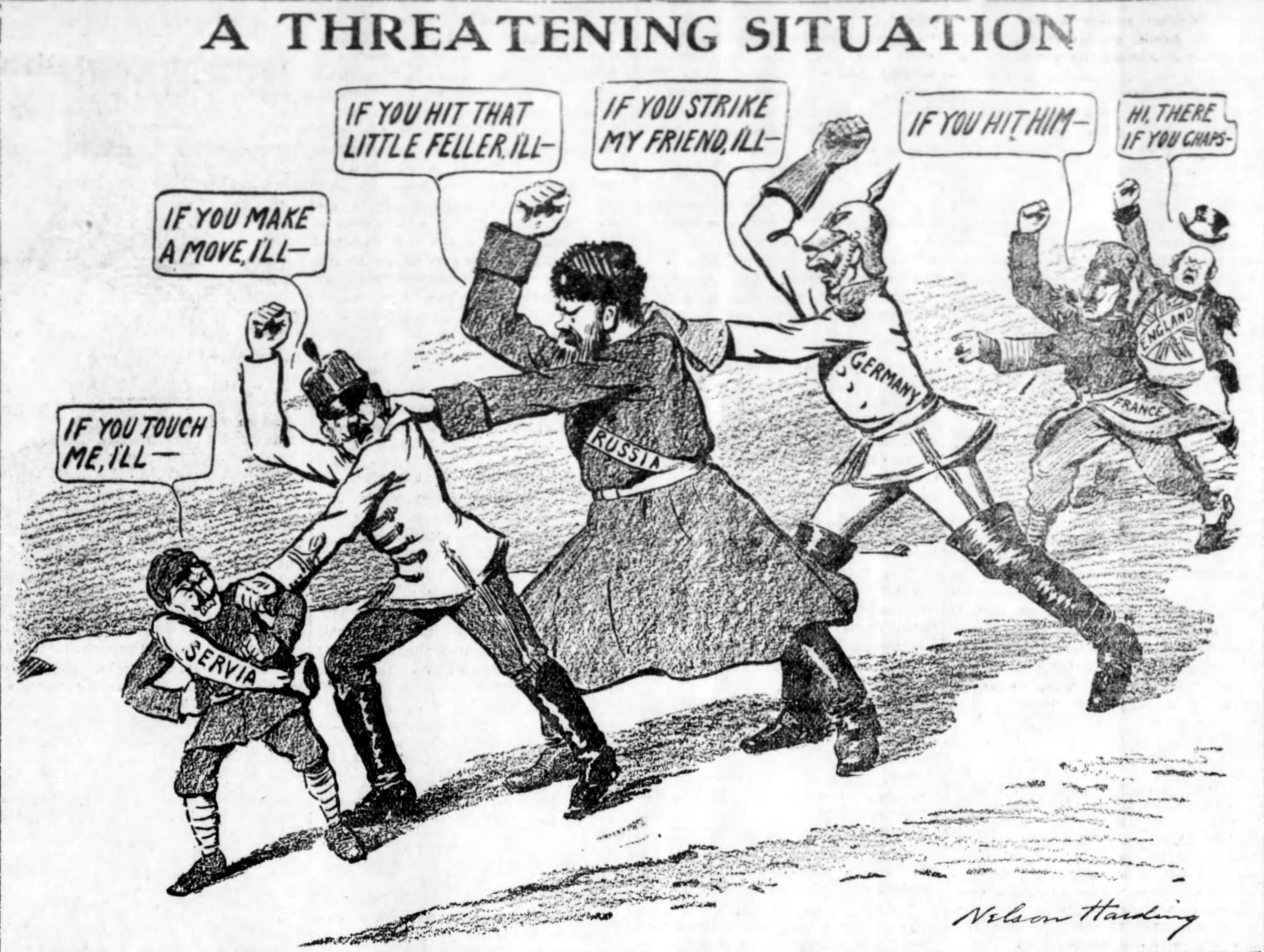
"A Threatening Situation", an American comic from July 1914: "If Austria attacks Serbia, Russia will fall upon Austria, Germany upon Russia, and France and England upon Germany."

One of the factors that led to the beginning of World War I was close bilateral relations between the Kingdom of Serbia and the Russian Empire. While Russia and Serbia were not formally allied, Russia openly sought political and religious influence in Serbia. In May 1914, Serbian politics were polarized between two factions, one headed by the prime minister Nikola Pašić, and the other by the radical nationalist chief of Military Intelligence, Colonel Dragutin Dimitrijević, known by his codename Apis. In that month, due to Colonel Dimitrijević's intrigues, Peter I dismissed Pašić's government, but the Russian Minister in Belgrade intervened to have Pašić's government restored. Pašić, though he often talked in public, knew that Serbia was near-bankrupt and, having suffered heavy casualties in the Balkan Wars and in the suppression of an Albanian revolt in Kosovo, needed peace in that moment of time. Since Russia also favoured peace in the Balkans, from the Russian viewpoint, it was desirable to keep Pašić in power. However, the Assassination of Archduke Franz Ferdinand led Austria-Hungary to declare war on Serbia during the July Crisis. Russia mobilized its armed forces in late July ostensibly to defend Serbia, but also to maintain its status as a great power, gain influence in the Balkans and deter Austria-Hungary and the German Empire. This led Germany to declare war on Russia, ultimately turning the local conflict into World War I.

=== Interwar period ===
A few months after the Russian Revolution in 1917, the Russian Civil War ensued, in which a small number of mercenaries from Serbia fought for both the Russian Whites and the Bolsheviks. After the Civil War ended in 1922 in a Bolshevik victory, relations between the Kingdom of Yugoslavia and the Soviet Union were frosty. It was not until 1940 that the Kingdom of Yugoslavia formally recognized the Soviet Union and established diplomatic relations, one of the last European countries to do so.

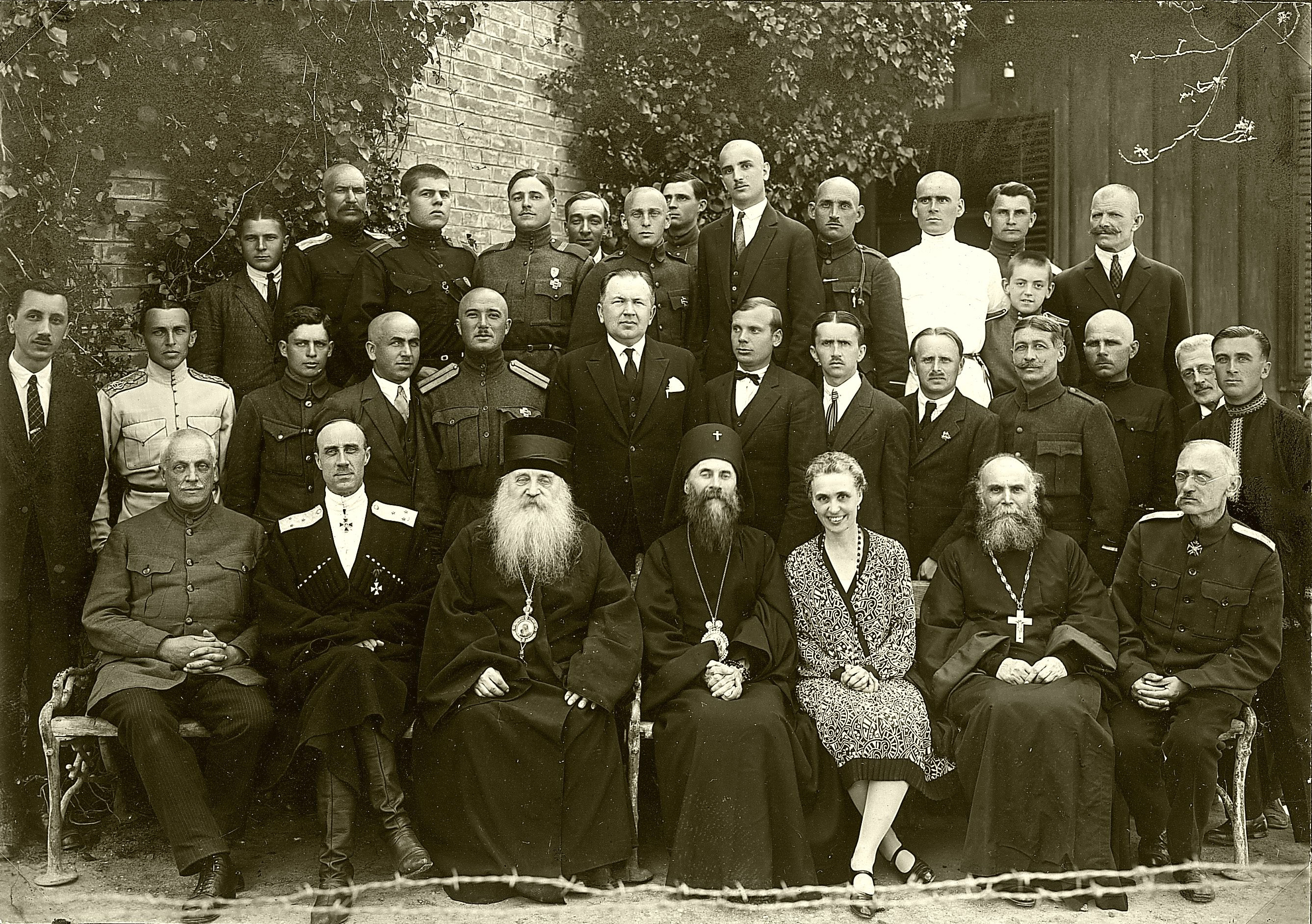
General Pyotr Wrangel, chairman of the Russian All-Military Union (second left), and Metropolitan Anthony Khrapovitsky (third left) in Belgrade, 1927

Since 1920, the government of the Kingdom of Yugoslavia welcomed tens of thousands of anti-Bolshevik Russian refugees, mainly those who fled after the final defeat of the Russian Army under General Pyotr Wrangel in Crimea in 1920, explaining its hospitality by presenting it as paying back the debt Serbia owed Russia for its intervention on the side of Serbia at the outbreak of World War I. The Kingdom of Yugoslavia became home for 40,000 exiles loyal to the late Russian Empire. In 1921, at the invitation of the Serbian Patriarch Dimitrije, the leadership of the Russian Church in exile moved from Constantinople to Serbia and in 1922 in Sremski Karlovci established a de facto independent ecclesiastical administration that a few years later, was instituted as the Russian Orthodox Church Outside Russia. The exiled Russian clergy's devotion and dedication to the Church was held up as an example by the church people in Serbia. The Russian Orthodox Church Outside Russia's Head Metropolitan Anthony Khrapovitsky was widely viewed as a spiritual leader of all the Russian émigrés until his death in 1936. Serbian Patriarch Varnava came to be a staunch defender and advocate of the Russian exiles in Yugoslavia and exerted constant pressure on the Royal Court and government to forestall any rapprochement and establishment of diplomatic relations between the Kingdom of Yugoslavia and the Soviet Union. The Russian community in the Kingdom of Yugoslavia was effectively in a privileged position in a number of ways, as it enjoyed support and protection on the part of the ruling House of Karađorđević.

The Russian military servicemen under the command of General Pyotr Wrangel were partly enlisted into the Kingdom of Yugoslavia's Border Guard troops and deployed on the country's southeastern and northwestern borders. This service was terminated by a law passed in 1922 that abolished the Border Guard troops; in 1923–1924 Wrangel's men were engaged in a contract to build a road between Kraljevo and Raška.

At the Genoa Conference in 1922, there occurred a spat between the Soviet Union's delegation and that of the Kingdom of Yugoslavia over the absence of a delegation from Montenegro; a meeting between Georgy Chicherin and Momčilo Ninčić took place on the sidelines of the conference: the sides arrived at a pro forma agreement that the government of the Kingdom of Yugoslavia would prevent further activities of Russian émigrés in its territory. Nevertheless, Russian émigré activity continued apace: multiple Russian military officers′ associations were set up in Yugoslavia, which in 1924 were united under an umbrella council headed by the seniormost Russian generals Eduard Ekk and Georgiy Rozalion-Soshalsky. In 1924, a cavalry brigade staffed completely by Wrangel's men was formed under the command of former Russian Empire General Sergei Ulagay in order to overthrow Albania′s pro-Soviet Orthodox leader Fan Noli, who had seized power in June that year, and re-install Muslim Ahmet Zogu, which was carried out in December that year. In 1924, Wrangel founded the Russian All-Military Union, until 1927 headquartered in Sremski Karlovci, a global organization designed to unite all Russian military officers outside the USSR. The Russian All-Military Union membership in the Kingdom of Yugoslavia totaled 25,000 in 1934. Department IV of the Russian All-Military Union was headquartered in Belgrade and was in constant liaison with Yugoslavia's Ministry of the Army and Navy.

The Soviet intelligence agencies were undertaking efforts to recruit agents in the Kingdom of Yugoslavia from the early 1930s, including from among the émigrés such as Leonid Linitsky, who was exposed and arrested by the King of Yugoslavia's police in 1935. In 1938, the Soviet government sponsored a planned coup d'état designed to remove the Stojadinović government, which was resented by Edvard Beneš, the president of Czechoslovakia and establish an anti-German military regime: Soviet intelligence officer Pyotr Zubov was given $200,000 in cash meant for the Serbian military officers selected by the Czechs to execute the coup. The plan failed, as Zubov, after judging the Serbian officers to be unfit for the mission, refused to make advance payment.

While Yugoslavia remained a monarchy, Communist elements in Yugoslavia retained some influence in the National Assembly (in 1920, the government prohibited all Communist activities). Relations between Yugoslavian Communists and the officials of the Soviet Union were extensive. Initial relations, however, remained tense. In 1937, for example, Joseph Stalin had the Secretary-General of the League of Communists of Yugoslavia, Milan Gorkić, murdered in Moscow during the Great Purge.

=== World War II ===
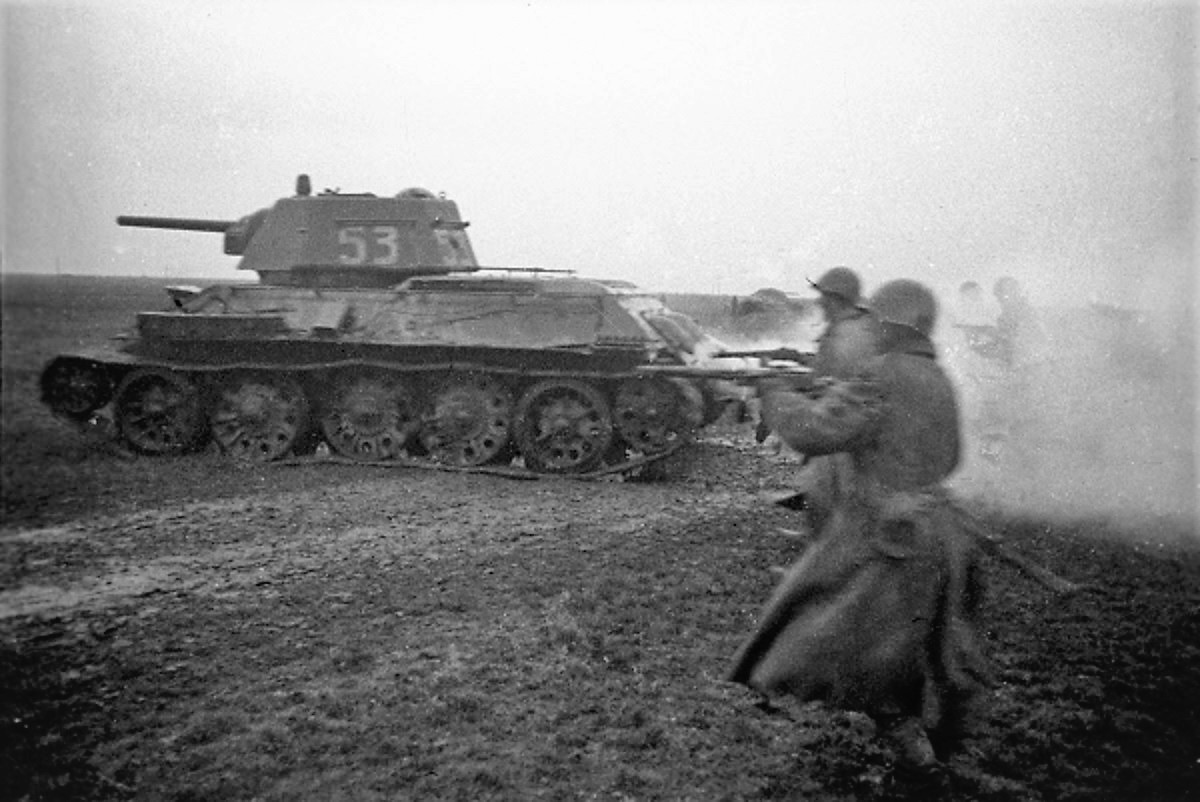
Troops of the 3rd Ukrainian Front of the Red Army during the Belgrade Offensive

The March 1941 coup d'état against the pro-German government of Yugoslavia, while primarily backed by the British government, was also actively supported by Soviet intelligence agencies, GRU and NKVD, following Stalin′s instructions, with a view to strengthening the Soviet Union's strategic position in the Balkans. On 5 April 1941, the new government of Yugoslavia and the Soviet Union signed the Treaty of Friendship and Non-Aggression, which however did not commit the parties to military assistance in case of aggression.

According to Soviet General Pavel Sudoplatov, the Soviet leadership was shocked by an instant defeat of Yugoslavia in April 1941, after Hitler reacted to the coup ″promptly and effectively″. After Germany attacked the Soviet Union in June 1941, the Soviet Union began to assist the military campaign of Yugoslav Partisans led by Tito; and from the autumn of 1944 regular Red Army troops directly participated in battles in cooperation with the Partisans, especially in the territories of present-day Serbia. The most notable of these battles in which Soviet soldiers fought was the Belgrade Offensive.

=== Soviet Union and Socialist Yugoslavia ===
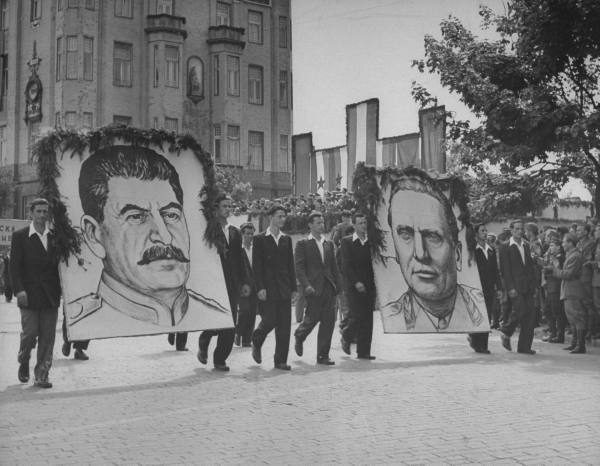
Portraits of Stalin and Tito on the May Day Parade in Belgrade, 1946

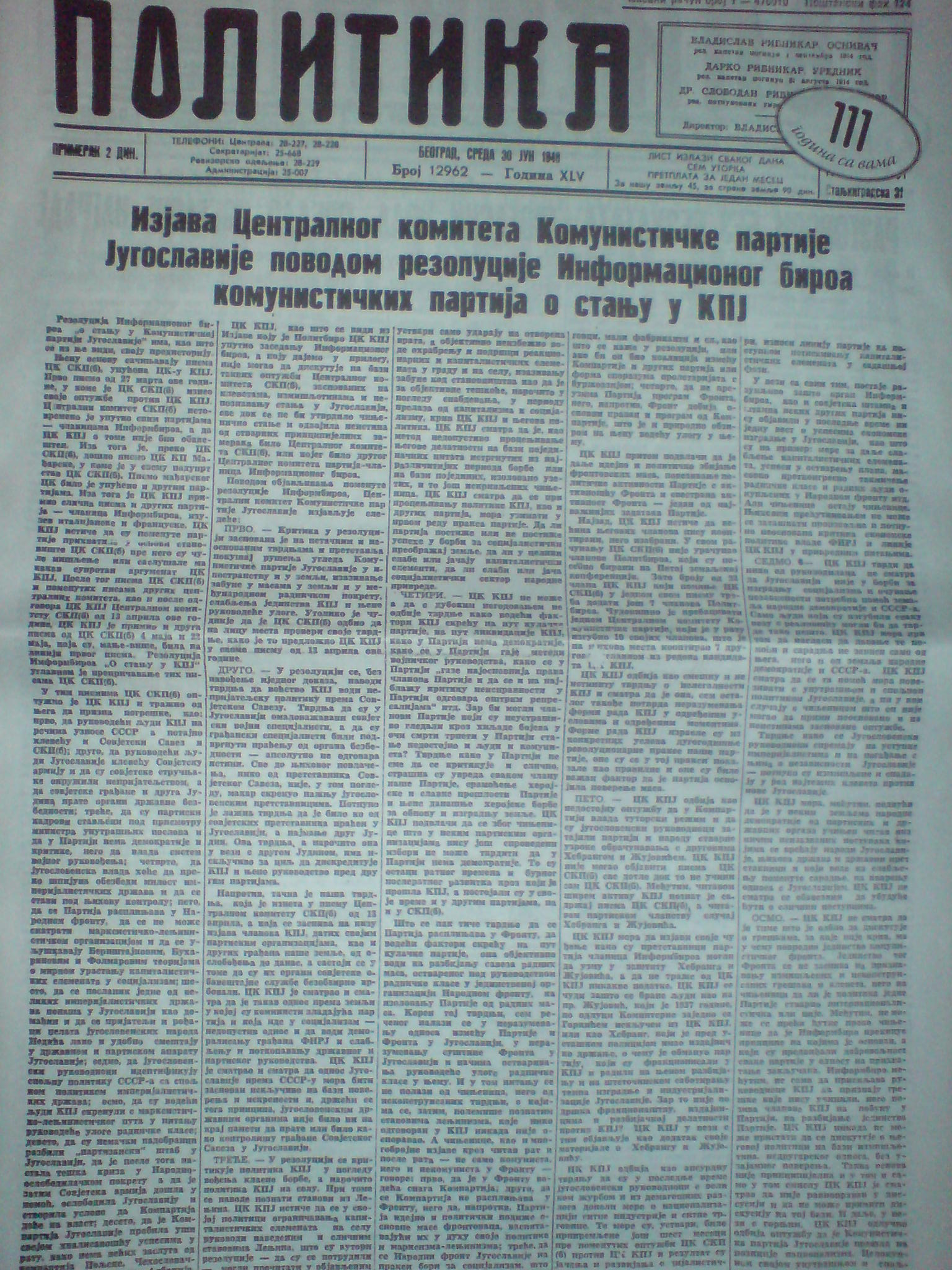
The Communist Party of Yugoslavia's response in the Politika to the Yugoslav Communist Party's expulsion from the Cominform

After the war ended in 1945, King Peter II was not allowed to return to Yugoslavia; he was formally deposed by Communist-dominated Constituent Assembly with the state reorganized as a republic and renamed Federal People's Republic of Yugoslavia (from 1963 Socialist Federal Republic of Yugoslavia). Initially, Yugoslavia's Communist regime under Josip Broz Tito was loyal to Joseph Stalin. The latter wanted Yugoslavia to become a member of the Soviet-led block of Communist countries. However, Tito eventually rejected Stalin's pressure and in 1950s became one of the founders of the Non-Aligned Movement, which was regarded as the third way, neither adhering to the U.S.-led NATO, nor joining the Moscow-dominated Warsaw Pact.

As early as 1945, the Soviet Union concluded a friendship treaty with Tito, who put signature on behalf of the Regent Council of Yugoslavia. In the first two years following the war, relations between Yugoslav and the Soviet leadership, which during that period sought to accommodate the Soviet Western allies demands in Europe, were not entirely free of disagreements on a number of issues, such as Yugoslavia's territorial claims to Italy's Free Territory of Trieste and the part of Austria's Carinthia populated by Carinthian Slovenes, Tito's efforts to play a leading role in the entire Balkans region, as well as over Stalin's reluctance to decisively support the Greek Communists in the Greek Civil War, who were actively supported by Yugoslavia, Bulgaria, and Albania. Drastic deterioration in relations occurred in early 1948. In June 1948, Tito did not attend the second conference of the Cominform, which was established on the Soviet initiative in 1947 as a coordinating body for Communist parties in the Soviet Union, Bulgaria, Hungary, Poland, Italy, France, Czechoslovakia, Romania, and Yugoslavia. The conference was mostly dedicated to the discussion of the situation in the Communist Party of Yugoslavia. On 28 June 1948, the other member countries adopted a resolution that noted that ″recently the leadership of the Communist Party of Yugoslavia had pursued an incorrect line on the main questions of home and foreign policy, a line which represents a departure from Marxism-Leninism″; the resolution concluded by stating, ″the Central Committee of the Communist Party of Yugoslavia has placed itself and the Yugoslav Party outside the family of the fraternal Communist Parties, outside the united Communist front and consequently outside the ranks of the Information Bureau.″ The assumption in Moscow was that once it was known that he had lost Soviet approval, Tito would collapse. The expulsion effectively banished Yugoslavia from the international association of socialist states, while other socialist states of Eastern Europe subsequently underwent purges of alleged "Titoists". Stalin took the matter personally and attempted, unsuccessfully, to assassinate Tito on several occasions.

The following year, the crisis nearly escalated into an armed conflict, as Hungarian and Soviet forces were massing on the northern Yugoslav frontier. In 1949, the Ministry of Foreign Affairs of Yugoslavia formally protested against the support rendered by the Soviet Union to a group of Yugoslav citizens who had formed a committee in Moscow in early April to promote ″unfriendly activity against the Yugoslavia". The Soviet response asserted the Soviet Union's right to offer asylum to "Yugoslav revolutionary emigrants″ and stated that Yugoslavia′s government ″had forfeited the right to expect a friendly attitude″ from the Soviet Union, as it had established an ″anti-Communist and anti-democratic terrorist regime″ in Yugoslavia and was fighting against the Soviet Union. In November 1949, the Kominform adopted another resolution which stated that the Communist Party of Yugoslavia had been hijacked by a group of ″murderers and spies" and declared that fighting against the "Tito gang" was a duty of all communist and workers′ parties.

After Stalin's death, relations underwent normalization heralded by the signing of the Belgrade declaration in 1955, which expressly rescinded Stalin's policies towards Yugoslavia. Nevertheless, the Yugoslavia never joined the Soviet-led political and military block of socialist countries and remained one of the leading members of the Non-Aligned Movement, a grouping of countries that sought to be neutral in the Cold War. However, Yugoslav government's permission to Soviet Air Force to fly over the country, allowed Soviet Union to send advisors, weapons and troops to Egypt between Six-Day War and Yom Kippur War. Economic and cultural ties between the Soviet Union and Yugoslavia developed successfully until the late 1980s.

=== Breakup of Yugoslavia ===
The breakup of Yugoslavia and the dissolution of the Soviet Union occurred simultaneously. Throughout the 1990s, Federal Republic of Yugoslavia was hard hit with UN sanctions; meanwhile Russia was undergoing painful structural reforms that were accompanied by a steady economic decline until 1999. Relations between the countries were largely neglected.

In 1998, the Kosovo War began, followed by break-up of relations between Yugoslavia and the West and to the NATO bombing of Yugoslavia, which Russia strongly condemned. Russian president Boris Yeltsin described NATO's military action against sovereign Yugoslavia as an ″open aggression″. Russia condemned NATO at the United Nations and supported the statement that NATO air strikes on Serbia were an illegal military action. Volunteers and mercenaries from Russia were cited to have gone to Kosovo in large numbers to fight the KLA, and to resist and complicate NATO operations. Around the time of the bombing, a Russia-friendly rhetoric developed in the Serbian leadership as Borislav Milošević, the brother of Slobodan Milošević and the Yugoslav ambassador to Moscow at the time, proposed joining the Federal Republic of Yugoslavia the Union State composed of Belarus and Russia.

== Political relations ==
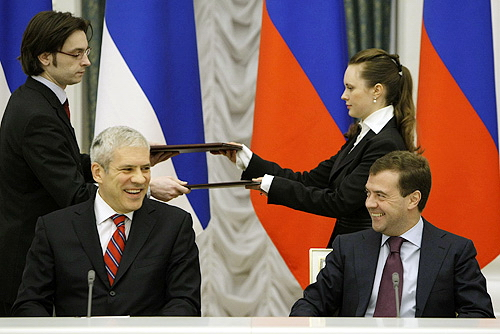
Boris Tadić, President of Serbia, and Dmitry Medvedev, President of Russia, in Moscow, 2009

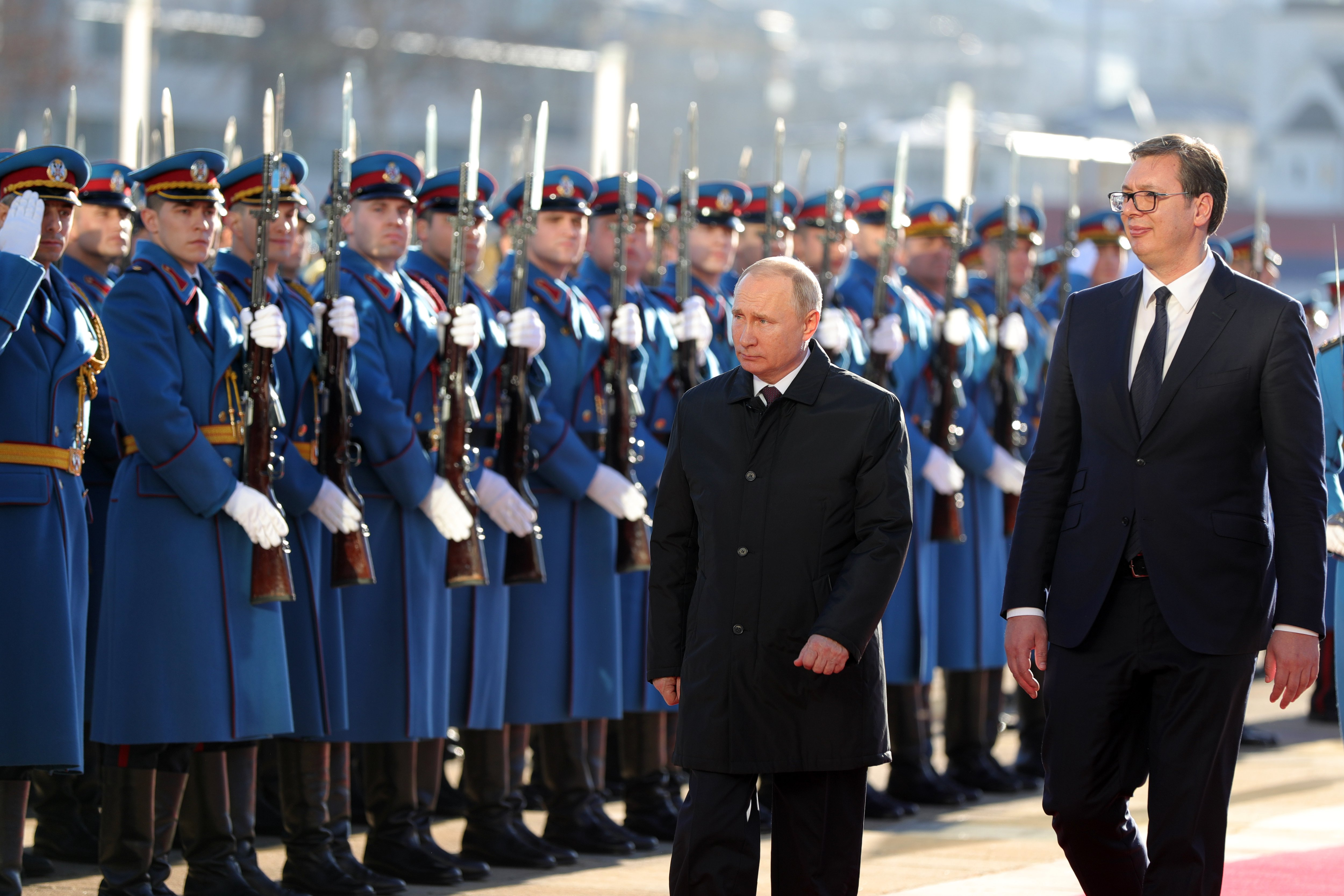
Aleksandar Vučić, President of Serbia, and Vladimir Putin, President of Russia, in Belgrade, 2019

Formalized by the 2013 Strategic Partnership Declaration, Serbia and Russia maintain robust political ties, with about seventy bilateral treaties covering trade, energy, military, and cultural cooperation. High-level visits, such as those of presidents of Serbia to Moscow (Boris Tadić in 2004 and 2009, Tomislav Nikolić in 2012 and 2016, and Aleksandar Vučić in 2019, 2020, and 2021) and presidents of Russia to Belgrade (Vladimir Putin 2000, 2011, 2014, and 2019; Dmitry Medvedev in 2009) underscore close relationship between two countries. However, some observers call them increasingly pragmatic, with Serbia leveraging Russia to balance EU pressure while Russia uses Serbia to counter Western influence in the Balkans.

Serbia did not impose sanctions on Russia following the start of the Russo-Ukrainian War in 2014. In response to the Russian invasion of Ukraine in 2022, president Aleksandar Vučić stated that while Serbia felt it was wrong for Russia to violate the territorial integrity of Ukraine, it also emphasized that Serbia's foreign policy choices are driven by national interests and respect for traditional friendships. In March 2022, however, Serbia voted in favour of the UN General Assembly resolution condemning Russia's invasion of Ukraine voted following month in favour of expelling Russia from the UN Human Rights Council. In 2023, Vučić emphasized that Serbia cannot and will not support Russia's invasion of Ukraine, stating, "For us, Crimea is Ukraine, Donbas is Ukraine, and it'll remain so." This statement is a significant shift in Serbia's position since Putin's invasion of Ukraine almost 11 months ago. Vučić clarified that it would be wrong to assume that Serbia fully endorses the Russia's actions, stating "we are not always jubilant about some of their stances. We have a traditionally good relationship, but it doesn't mean that we support every single decision or most of the decisions that are coming from the Kremlin."

=== Russian stance on Kosovo ===
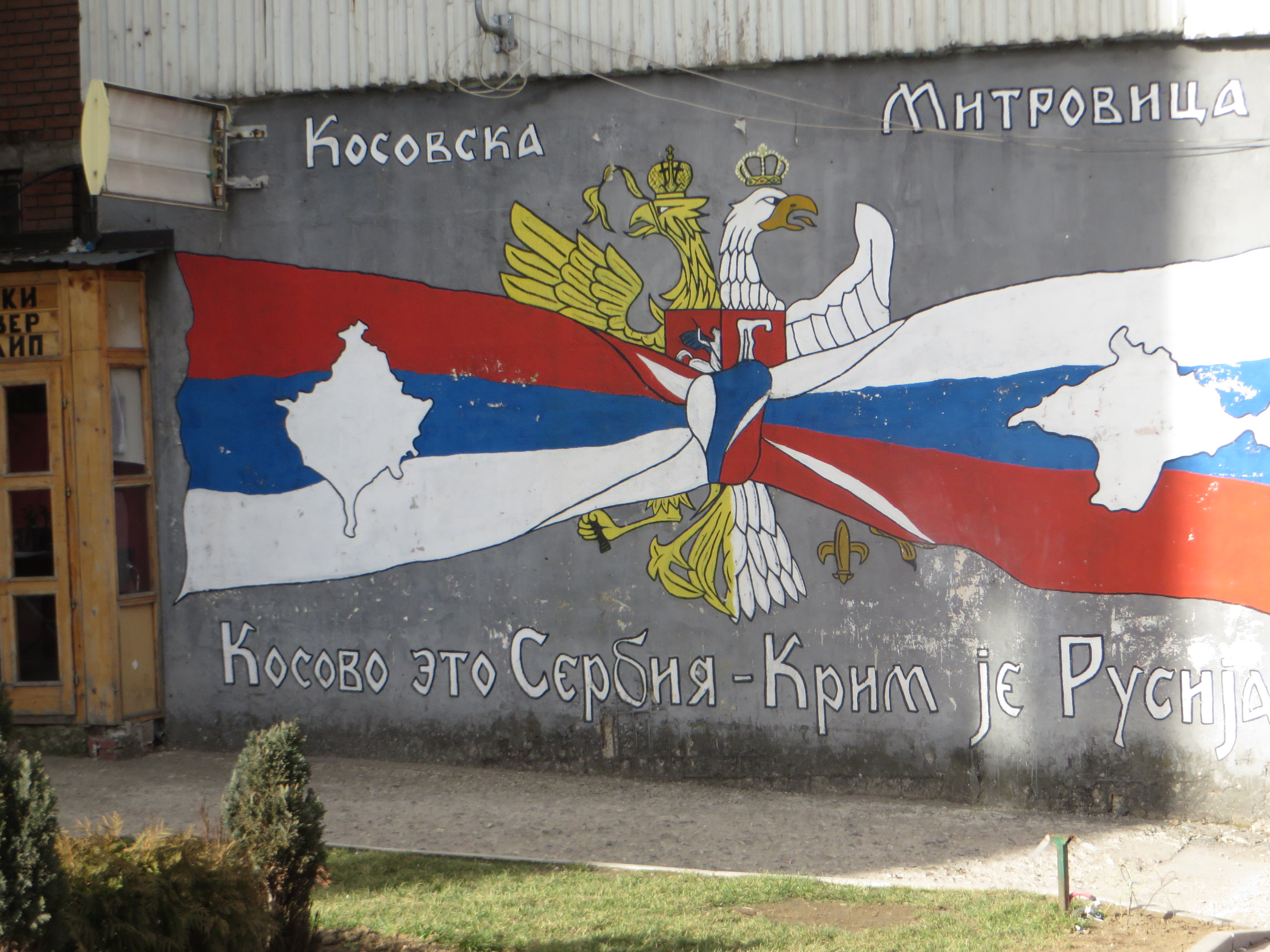
Mural in North Mitrovica, "Kosovo is Serbia - Crimea is Russia"

Russia has backed Serbia's position regarding Kosovo. Vladimir Putin said that any support for Kosovo's unilateral declaration is immoral and illegal. He described the recognition of Kosovo's unilaterally declared independence by several major world powers as "a terrible precedent" that "breaks up the entire system of international relations" that have taken "centuries to evolve", and "undoubtedly, it may entail a whole chain of unpredictable consequences to other regions in the world" that will come back to hit the West "in the face". In 2008, Russian president Dmitry Medvedev stated in a major foreign policy speech "For the EU, Kosovo is almost what Iraq is to the United States.... This is the latest example of the undermining of international law". Russian ambassador to Serbia Aleksandr Konuzin told in 2009 interview to Belgrade daily that "Russia's stand is rather simple — we are ready to back whatever position Serbia takes with regards to Kosovo."

In 2014, Russia used Kosovo's declaration of independence as a justification for recognizing the independence of Crimea, citing the so-called Kosovo independence precedent; Crimea was annexed by Russia just a week later. Russia's recognition and subsequent annexation of Donetsk and Luhansk by Putin's government were also done under the pretext of Kosovo precedent.

=== Serbian stance on Russian invasion of Ukraine ===
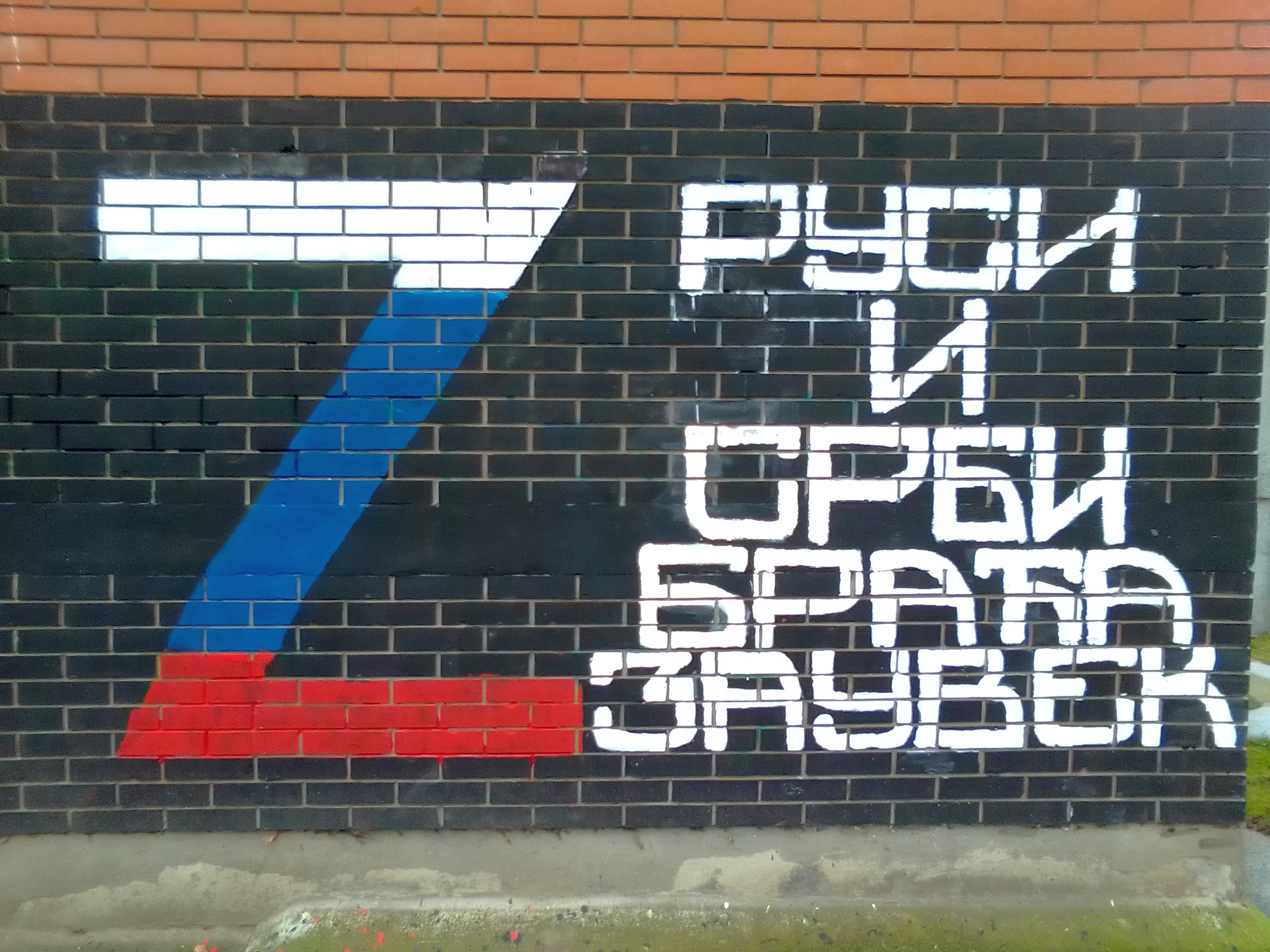
Mural featuring the Z symbol in Belgrade, "Russians and Serbs, brothers forever."

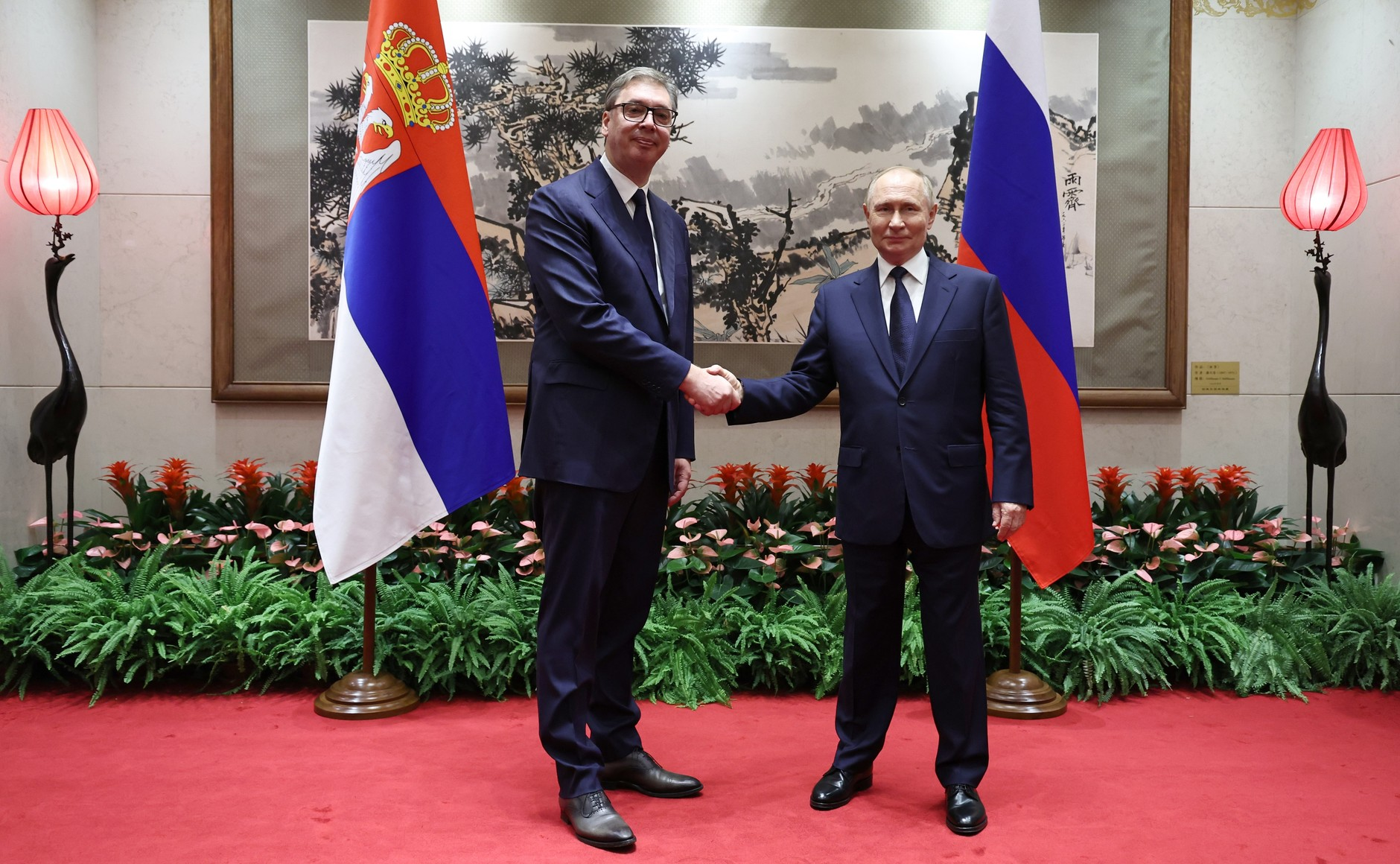
Serbian president Aleksandar Vučić with Russian president Vladimir Putin, 2 September 2025

After the start of Russian invasion of Ukraine in 2022, the Serbian government reaffirmed its respect for Ukraine's territorial integrity. Serbia voted in favour of UN General Assembly resolutions condemning Russia's illegal attempt to annex four regions of Ukraine.

Since the beginning of war, significant numbers of Serbian citizens (and ethnic Serbs from neighboring countries) took up arms to fight against Ukraine, which prompted the Serbian government to pass a law prohibiting its citizens from taking part in hostilities on foreign soil. In 2019 the Ukrainian Embassy in Serbia estimated that around 300 Serbian nationals were fighting in Ukraine, all of them on the Russian side. After the 2022 invasion, many more Serbian nationals took up arms to fight on the Russian side.

Serbian public sentiment has been decidedly pro-Russian, with over 70% of Serbian citizens supporting Russia over Ukraine. Several rallies in support of Ukraine were held in Belgrade. Rallies in support of Russia's invasion have been held as well and those were more attended than pro-Ukraine ones. Numerous murals and graffiti supporting Russia's invasion of Ukraine appeared throughout Belgrade following the invasion.

As a result of the 2022–2023 Pentagon document leaks, it was reported that the Serbian government had secretly agreed to supply arms and ammunition to Ukraine. The allegations were denied by Serbian officials at the time, but several months later, Serbian president Aleksandar Vučić told the Financial Times: "Is it possible that it's happening? I have no doubts that it might happen. What is the alternative for us? Not to produce it? Not to sell it? [...] But I'm not a fool. I am aware that some of the arms might end up in Ukraine." At a multilateral summit meeting in 2024, Ukrainian president Volodymyr Zelenskyy thanked Vučić for the humanitarian support the Serbian government had provided his country.

== Economic relations ==
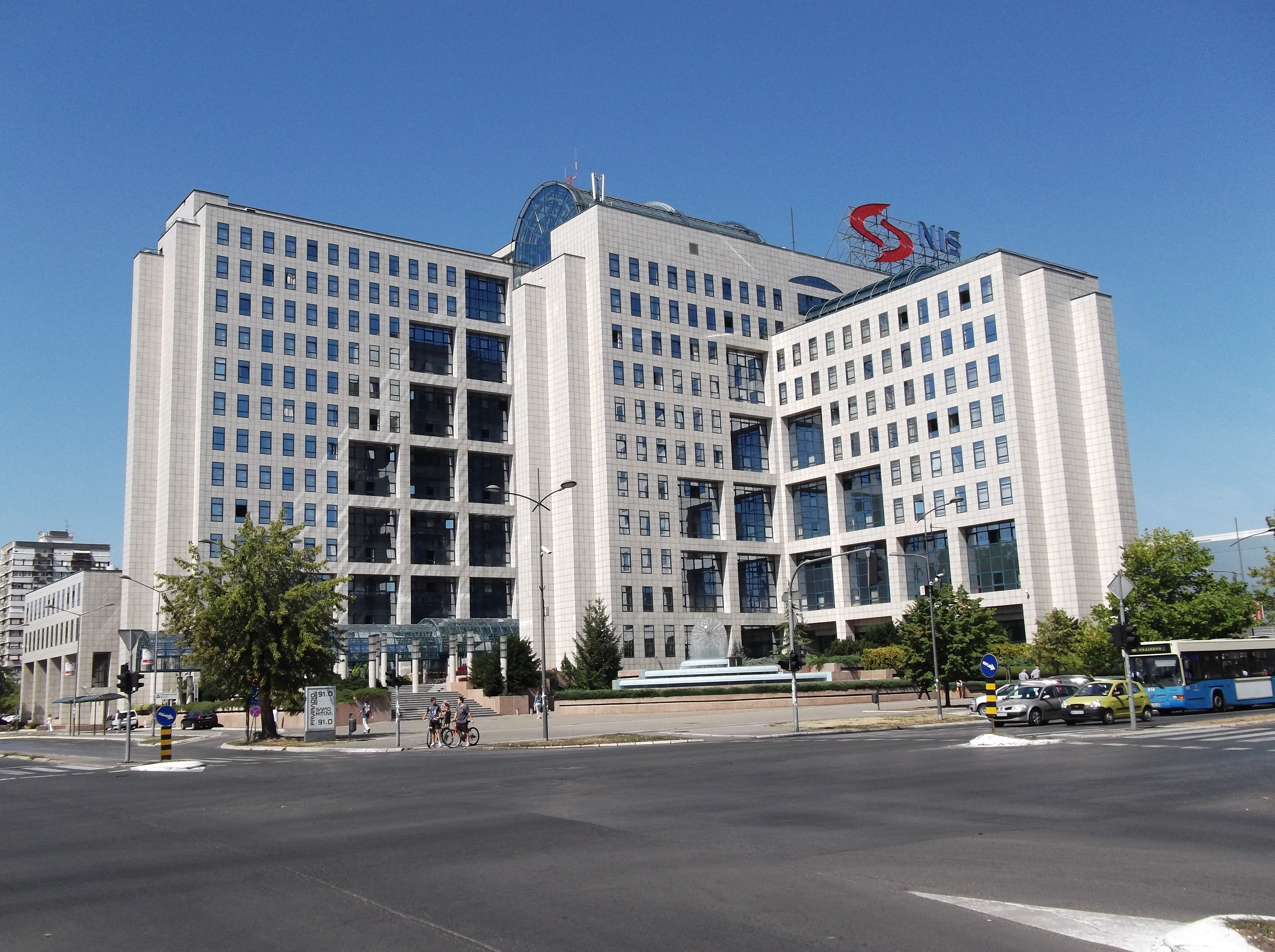
The headquarters of NIS in Novi Sad, majority owned by Gazprom Neft

Trade between two countries reached almost $3 billion in 2023; Russia's merchandise exports to Serbia were about $1.7 billion; Serbian exports were standing at roughly $1.2 billion. More than two-thirds of Russian exports was said to be a natural gas, transported through the TurkStream pipeline and providing for some 90% of Serbian annual natural gas consumption.

Naftna Industrija Srbije, Serbian national oil and gas company, is majority owned by the Russian company Gazprom Neft, a subsidiary of the state-owned Gazprom. The company's refinery in Pančevo (capacity of 4.8 million tonnes) is one of the most modern oil refineries in Europe; it also operates retail network of 334 filling stations in Serbia (74% of domestic market). Gazprom is also majority owner of HIP-Petrohemija, petrochemical complex in Pančevo. Russian retail chain Svetofor operates 24 stores in Serbia.

== Military cooperation ==
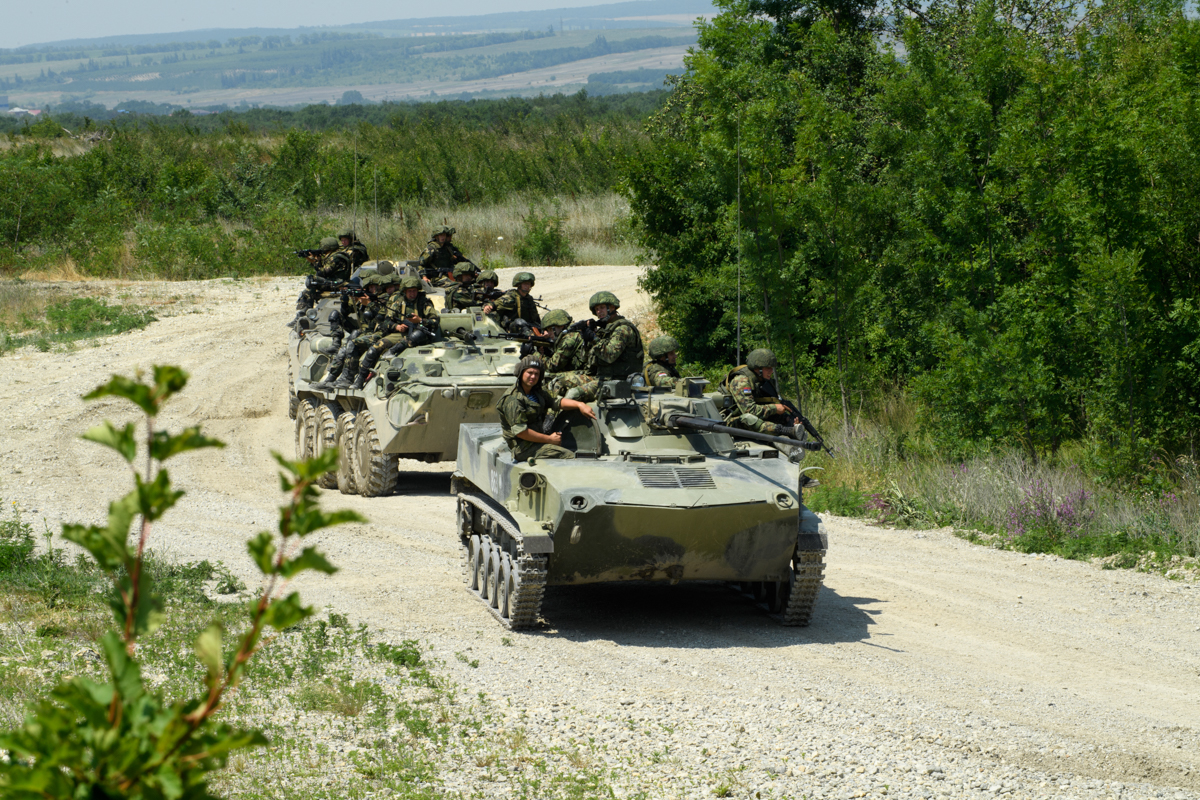
Serbian soldiers during the 2018 Slavic Brotherhood exercise at the Russian Army's Rayevsky Training Center

Ever since the Soviet period, the Serbian Armed Forces have been to certain degree dependent on Soviet/Russian technology. In recent years, procurement of Russian-made equipment included: Mi-35 attack helicopters, Pantsir-S1 air defense systems, as well as various missile acquisitions (R-77 air-to-air BVR missiles for MiG-29 fighter aircraft, Ataka air-to-surface missiles for Mi-35 helicopters, and Kornet man-portable anti-tank guided missiles).

Serbian Armed Forces participation in the annual Slavic Brotherhood trilateral military drills (involving Russian Armed Forces and Armed Forces of Belarus), initiated in 2015, has been a significant aspect of Serbia's military cooperation with Russia. They focused on special forces operations, counter-terrorism, peacekeeping, and tactical coordination, often involving live-fire exercises and advanced military hardware. Serbia's participation reflected its military neutrality policy, balancing cooperation with Russia against its much more extensive engagement with NATO (over 150 exercises since 2006). Serbia withdrew from these exercises in 2021 amid growing pressure from the European Union.

== Cultural cooperation ==
Cultural cooperation is vibrant, driven by active exchanges in arts, education, and media, all reinforced by mutual public affinity in both countries. The cultural bond is anchored in shared Slavic roots and the Orthodox Christian faith, with the Serbian Orthodox Church and Russian Orthodox Church playing significant roles. Russia's cultural influence in Serbia is stronger than vice versa, due to Russia's larger resources and media presence, while Serbian cultural exports are limited by funding and scale.

The "Days of Russian Culture" in Belgrade, featuring concerts, film screenings, and art exhibitions, were held in 2024, while "Days of Serbian Culture" were simultaneously held in Moscow, though on a smaller scale.

Russian literature, especially classics by Fyodor Dostoevsky and Leo Tolstoy, remains popular in Serbia, with new translations published regularly. Serbian authors like Ivo Andrić are promoted in Russia through state-backed initiatives. The Belgrade Book Fair frequently features Russian publishers, and Serbian publishers attend the Moscow International Book Fair, fostering literary exchange.

Russian classical musicians, ballet troupes (such as the Bolshoi Ballet), and choirs frequently perform in Serbia, particularly at events like the Belgrade Music Festival. Conversely, Serbian artists, such as folk ensembles, participate in Russian cultural festivals like the Moscow Slavic Bazaar. Art exchanges include exhibitions of Russian painters, such as 2023 exhibition at the National Museum of Serbia that featured Russian avant-garde art, drawing significant local interest.

Joint film festivals, such as the Russian Film Festival in Belgrade, showcase Russian cinema, while Serbian films are screened in Russia (e.g., at the Moscow International Film Festival). The 2019 Serbian-Russian film The Balkan Line, depicting the 1999 Kosovo conflict, was a co-production that topped box office charts in both countries.

Domestic affiliates of RT and Sputnik have a significant pay-TV and online presence in Serbia.

The Russian House – Russian Centre of Science and Culture in Belgrade, established in 1933, has served as a key hub for cultural exchange, offering Russian language courses (over 5,000 enrolled in language programs as of 2023), literature workshops, and cultural events.

Russia has funded cultural projects in Serbia, the most significant of which is the mosaic cladding of the interior of the Church of Saint Sava in Belgrade, conducted between 2017 and 2020. The authors of the mosaics were Nikolay Mukhin and Yevgeniy Maksimov, while the artists working on the mosaics were chosen from the Moscow School of Painting, Sculpture and Architecture and the Repin Institute of Arts at the Imperial Academy of Arts in Saint Petersburg.

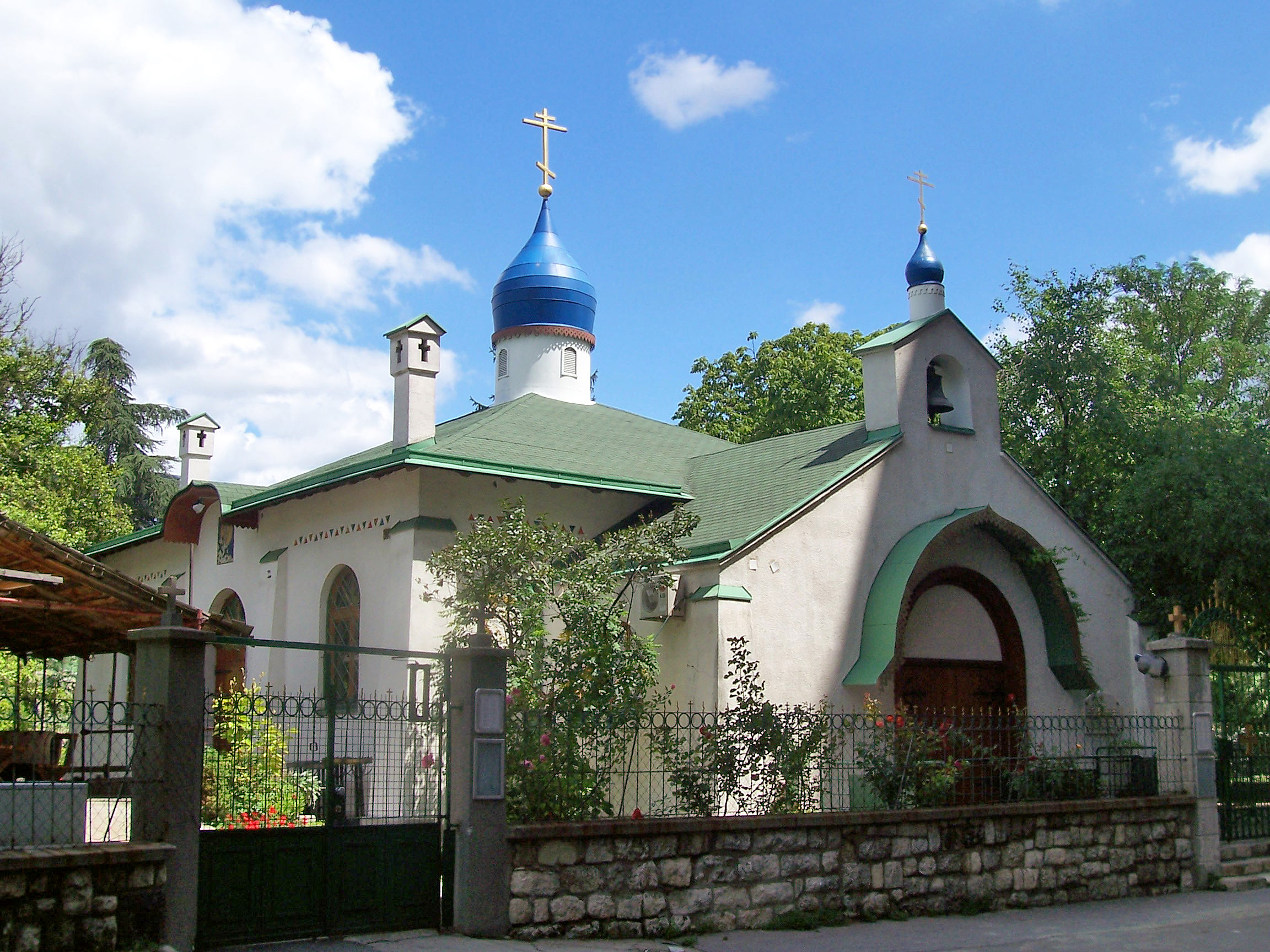
Russian Orthodox Church of the Holy Trinity in Belgrade

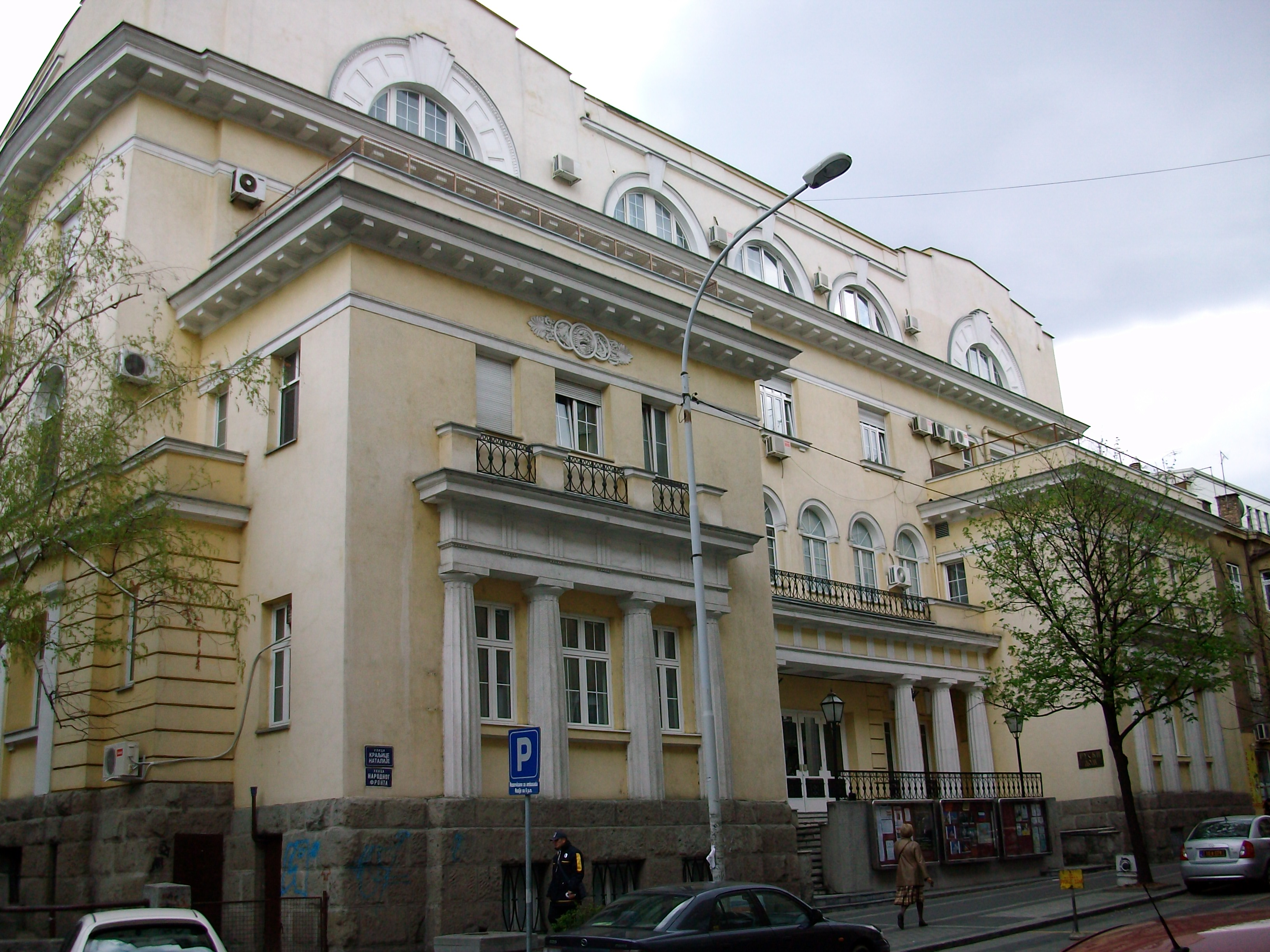
The Russian House - Russian Centre of Science and Culture in Belgrade

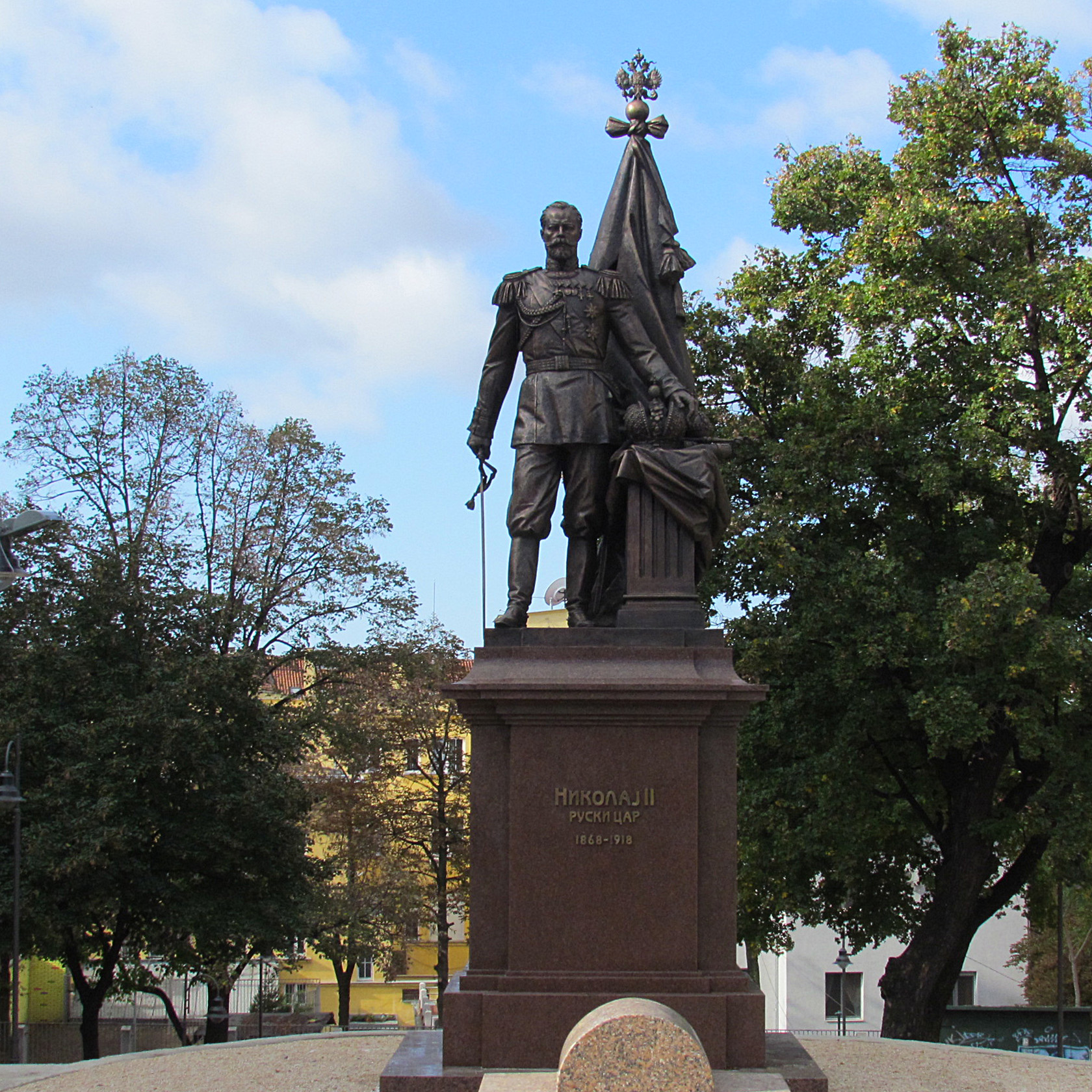
Statue of the Emperor Nicholas II in Belgrade

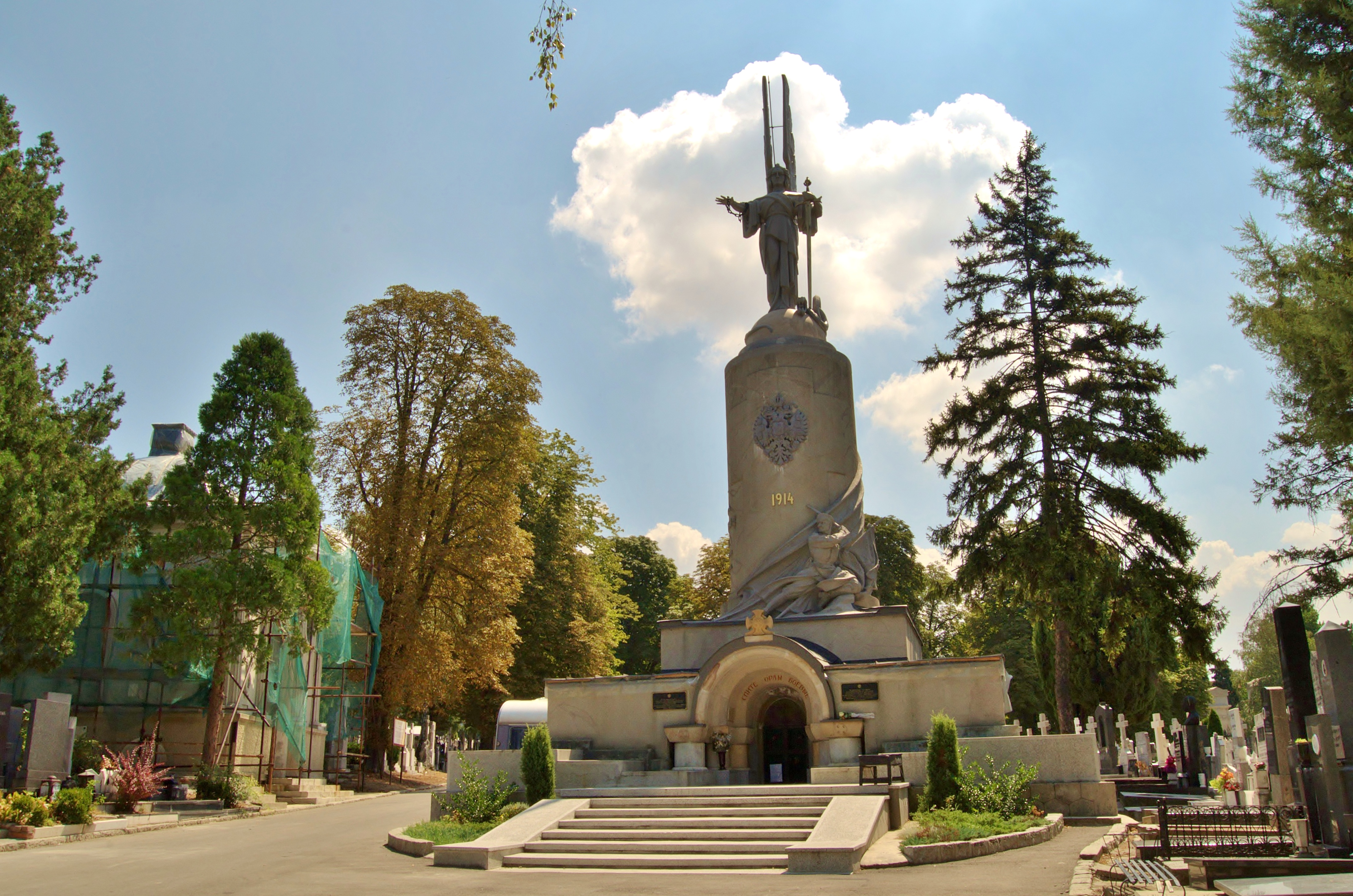
Russian World War I Military Cemetery in Belgrade

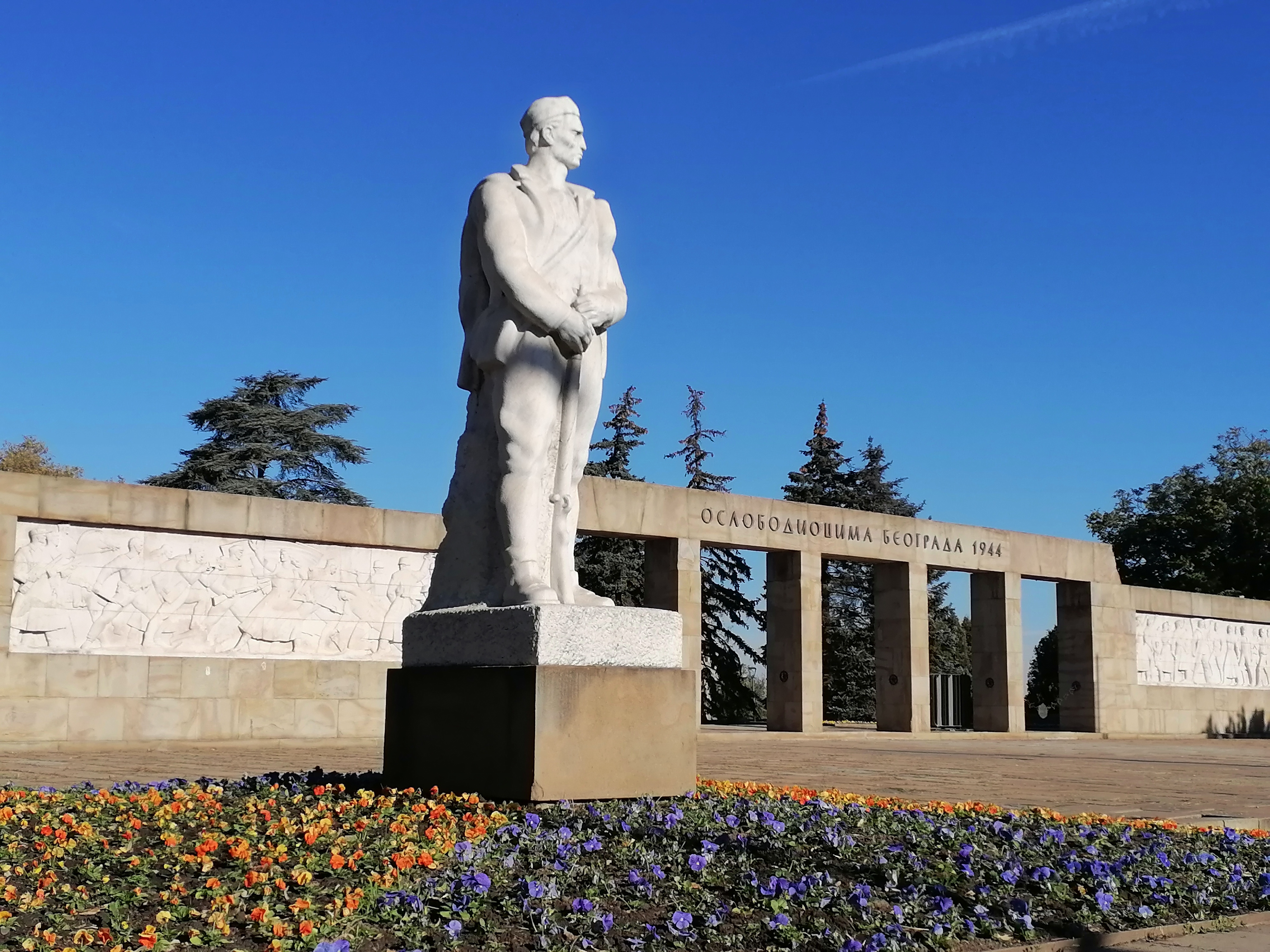
Soviet World War II Military Cemetery in Belgrade

== Immigration from Russia ==
According to 2022 Census there were 10,486 Russians in Serbia, including both Serbian citizens of ethnic Russian descent and Russian-born people residing in Serbia. Since the start of the war in Ukraine in 2022, more than 300,000 Russian nationals have entered Serbia of which some 53,000 settled in the country i.e. had been issued a residence permit.

There were two waves of Russian immigration to Serbia.

Following the October Revolution in 1917 and the subsequent Russian Civil War, a significant number of Russians, primarily those aligned with the anti-Bolshevik White movement, fled the newly established Soviet Union. This wave of emigration, often referred to as the "White Russian" exodus, saw over 1.5 million people leave Russia, with Serbia becoming a key destination due to its historical and cultural ties with Russia. By the end of the 1920s, approximately 40,000 Russian refugees were living in the Kingdom of Yugoslavia, with over two-thirds residing in the territory of present-day Serbia, particularly in Belgrade. The emigrants included former aristocrats, military officers, and intellectuals.

The Russian invasion of Ukraine, triggered another significant wave of Russian emigration, driven by political repression, economic sanctions, and fear of conscription following 2022 Russian mobilization. Serbia emerged as a primary destination due to its visa-free policy for Russians, its refusal to impose sanctions on Russia, and affordable living conditions. Russian migrants are mostly welcomed in Serbian society, but there have been tensions between pro-Putin Serbians and anti-war, pro-opposition Russian emigrants. Some anti-war Russians have been labeled a potential 'national security' risk by the Serbian authorities and face deportation to Russia.

== Travel regime ==
Russia and Serbia mutually abolished the requirement of obtaining an entry visa for its citizens in 2009. Since the Russian invasion of Ukraine in 2022, Serbia remained the only European country, besides Belarus, Moldova, and Bosnia and Herzegovina that still has a visa-free policy with Russia.

== Resident diplomatic missions ==
- Russia has an embassy in Belgrade.
- Serbia has an embassy in Moscow.
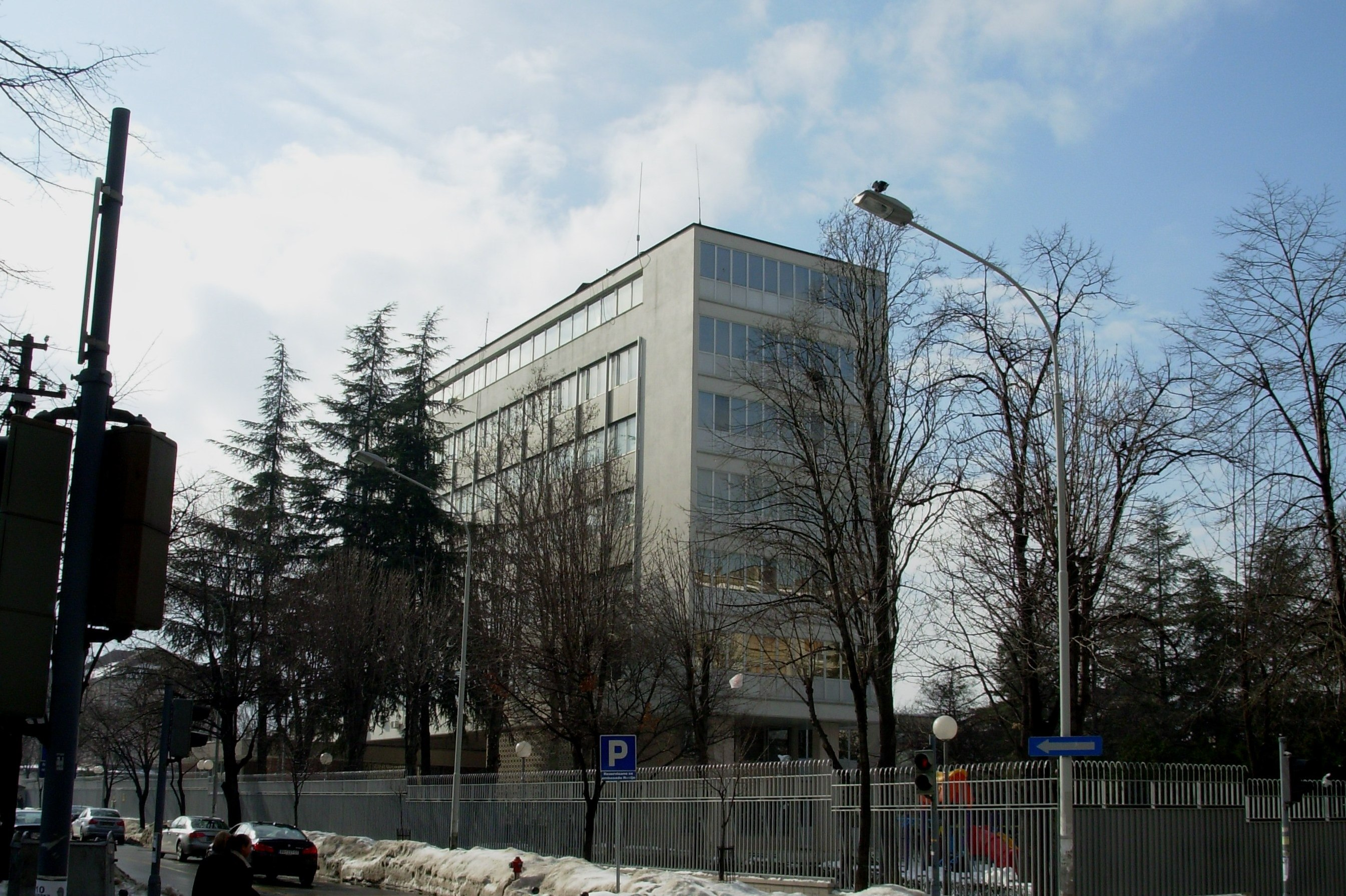
Embassy of Russia in Belgrade

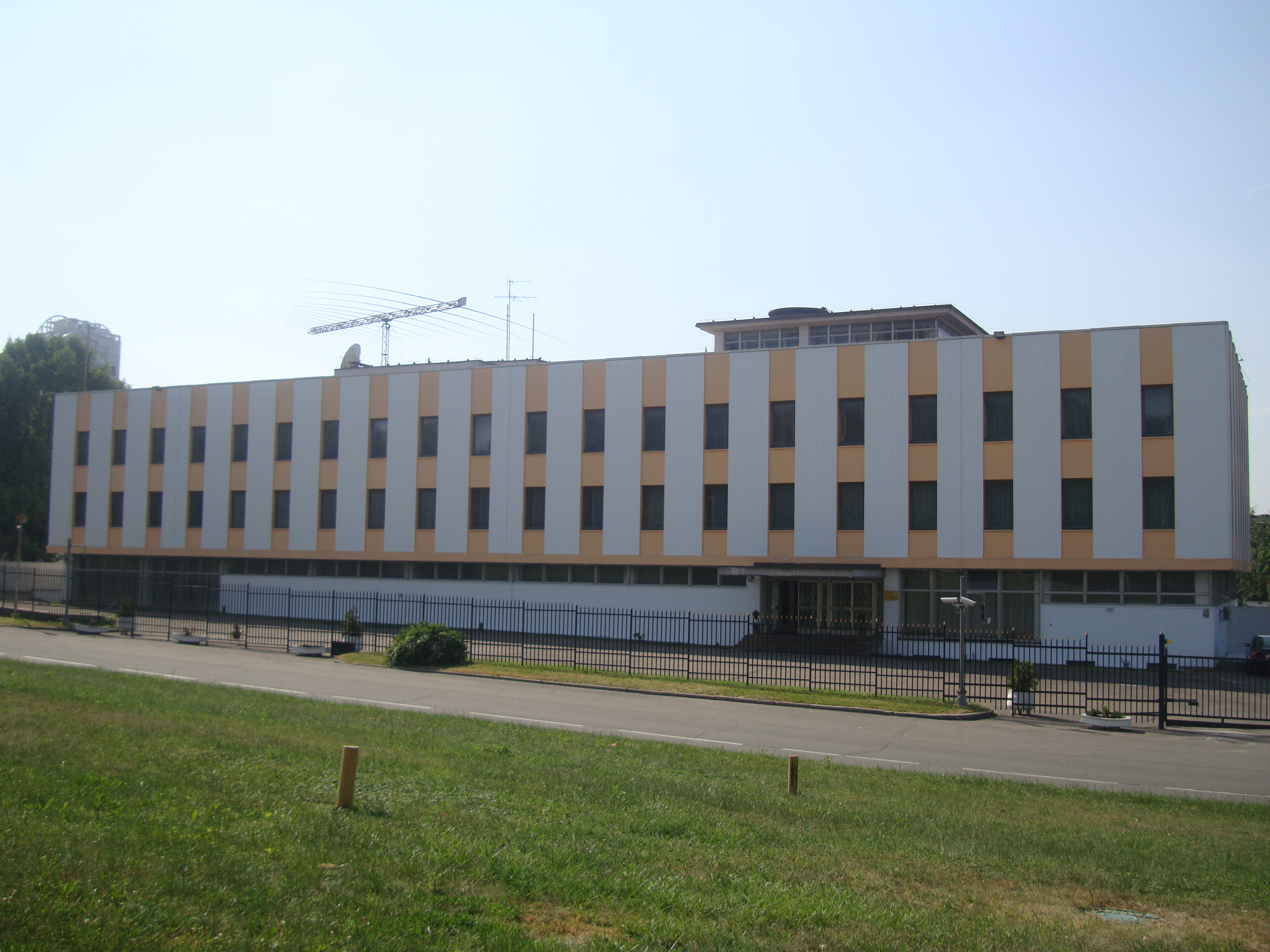
Embassy of Serbia in Moscow

== See also ==
- Foreign relations of Serbia
- Foreign relations of Russia
- Soviet Union–Yugoslavia relations

== Sources ==
- Antonenko, O. (2007). "Russia and the Deadlock over Kosovo". Survival. 49 (3): 91–106. doi:10.1080/00396330701564794. S2CID 153660061.
- Davidović, Blagoje (2003). Srbi u istoriji Rusije. Narodna knjiga–Alfa. ISBN 978-8633108119.
- Đurković, Vukadin S. (1903). "Odnosi između Srpstva i Rusije od 1185–1903 godine". (Public domain)
- Headley, J. (2008). Russia and the Balkans: foreign policy from Yeltsin to Putin. C Hurst.
- Jelavich, Barbara (2004). Russia's Balkan Entanglements, 1806–1914. Cambridge University Press. ISBN 978-0-521-52250-2.
- Jelavich, Charles (1958). Tsarist Russia and Balkan nationalism: Russian influence in the internal affairs of Bulgaria and Serbia, 1879–1886. University of California Press.
- Király, B. K.; Rothenberg, G. E. (1993). "Planning for war against Russia and Serbia: Austro-Hungarian and German military strategies, 1871–1914". War and Society in East Central Europe. 31. Brooklyn College Press.
- Kochegarov, K. A (2016). "К истории русско-украинско-сербских отношений в начале XVIII в.: "Забытая" миссия в Россию капитана Арсения Лешевича" (PDF). Историјски Часопис. 65. Belgrade: Istorijski institut: 147–158. Archived from the original (PDF) on 2018-03-24.
- Konitzer, Andrew (2011). "Serbia between East and West". Russian History. 38 (1): 103–124. doi:10.1163/187633111X549623.
- MacKenzie, David (1996). Serbs and Russians. East European Monographs. ISBN 978-0-88033-356-6.
- Meyendorff, John (1981). Byzantium and the Rise of Russia: A Study of Byzantino-Russian Relations in the Fourteenth Century (1st ed.). Cambridge: Cambridge University Press. ISBN 978-0521135337.
- Perović, Latinka (1993). Srpsko-ruske revolucionarne veze: prilozi za istoriju narodnjaštva u Srbiji. Službeni list SRJ. ISBN 978-8635501833.
- Zarko Petrovic, ed. (2010). "Russia-Serbia Relations at the Beginning of 21st Century" (PDF). ISAC Fund.
- MacKenzie, David (1967). The Serbs and Russian Pan-Slavism, 1875–1878. Cornell University Press.
- Popov, Nil (1870). "Србија и Русија: од Кочине крајине до Св. Андрејевске скупштине". Belgrade: Državna štamparija. (Public domain)
- Popović, Nikola B. (1994). Srbija i carska Rusija. Službeni list SRJ. ISBN 978-8635501963.
- Popović, Nikola B. (1977). Odnosi Srbije i Rusije u prvom svetskom ratu. Institut za savremenu istoriju.
- Shirev, Eric; Zubok, Vlad (2000). "Public Opinion and Decisionmaking in Russia: The impact of NATO Expansion and Air Strikes on Serbia". Decisionmaking in a Glass House: Mass Media, Public Opinion, and American and European Foreign Policy in the 21st Century.
- Simić, Jasminka (2014). "Economic Aspects of Strategic Partnership between Serbia and Russia". The New Century. 6.
- Sudoplatov, Pavel (1994). Special Tasks: The Memoirs of an Unwanted Witness – A Soviet Spymaster. Boston, MA: Little, Brown & Co. ISBN 0316773522.
- Sumner, B. H. (1937). Russia and the Balkans 1870–1880. Clarendon Press.
- Szpala, Marta (2014). "Russia in Serbia–soft power and hard interests" (PDF). OSW Commentary. 29.
- Škiljan, Filip (2014). Rusi u Hrvatskoj [Russians in Croatia] (in Croatian). Zagreb: Savez Rusa u Republici Hrvatskoj. ISBN 978-9535832706.
- Thaden, E. C. (1965). Russia and the Balkan Alliance of 1912. Vol. 47. University Park, Pennsylvania State University Press.
- Trivanovitch, Vaso (1931). "Serbia, Russia, and Austria during the Rule of Milan Obrenovich, 1868–78". The Journal of Modern History. 3 (3): 414–440. doi:10.1086/235761. S2CID 143618408.
- Vucinich, W. S. (1954). Serbia between East and West: the events of 1903–1908. Stanford University Press.
- Vujacic, Veljko (2004). "Perceptions of the State in Russia and Serbia: the Role of Ideas in the Soviet and Yugoslav Collapse". Post-Soviet Affairs. 20 (2): 164–194. doi:10.2747/1060-586x.20.2.164. S2CID 153917754.
- Vujacic, Veljko (1995). "Communism and nationalism in Russia and Serbia". Nationalism, Myth, and the State in Russia and Serbia. 1. Berkeley: University of California.
- Vuletić, Vitomir (1995). Rusi i Srbi u susretu. Matica srpska.
- Москва –. Србија, Београд – Русија: Друштвене и политичке везе 1804–1878: документа и материјали. Архив Србије. 2009. ISBN 978-5-7228-0205-7.
- Москва – Сербия, Белград – Россия : сборник документов и материалов. Архив Србије. 2009. ISBN 978-5-7228-0205-7.
- Enciklopedija Jugoslavije (1968). Enciklopedija Jugoslavije, Vol. 7 // Sovjetsko-jugoslovenski odnosi (in Serbo-Croatian). Zagreb, Socialist Federal Republic of Yugoslavia: Jugoslovenski leksikografski zavod.
- Dedijer, Vladimir (1980). Dokumenti 1948. // Knjiga Druga (in Serbo-Croatian). Beograd, Socialist Federal Republic of Yugoslavia: Izdavačka radna organizacija ″RAD″.
