= North Macedonia–Russia relations =

- North Macedonia: Russia

Diplomatic mission
- Embassy of North Macedonia, Moscow: Embassy of Russia, Skopje

North Macedonia–Russia relations (Macedonian: Македонско-руски односи, Russian: Российско-македонские отношения) are the bilateral relations between the Republic of North Macedonia and the Russian Federation. North Macedonia has an embassy in Moscow and a consulate in Saint Petersburg, while Russia has an embassy in Skopje and an honorary consulate in Ohrid. The ambassador of North Macedonia in Moscow is Nenad Kolev (as of April 2023), while the Russian ambassador in Skopje is Dmitry Zykov (as of December 2025). A Russian honorary consulate was opened in Bitola on May 22, 2002, but permission for it to operate was subsequently revoked by the North Macedonia government on June 1, 2022.

== Political relations ==
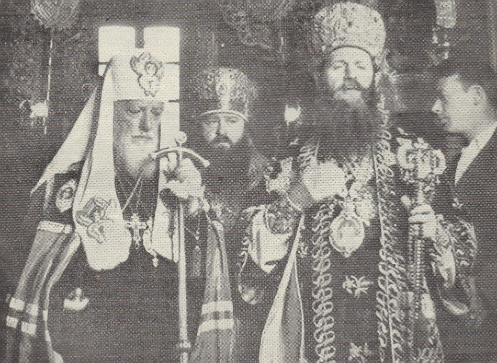
Patriarch of the Russian Orthodox Church Alexy I performing a joint ceremony with Macedonian Archbishop Dositheus II in Skopje, 1962.

=== Overview ===
Both countries have predominantly Slavic and Orthodox Christian populations and both officially use the Cyrillic alphabet, but depending on the historical period, their bilateral relations shifted from cooperation to hostility. As of March 2022, North Macedonia is included in Russia's Unfriendly Countries List. The most contentious issues are:

- North Macedonia's vote in favour for the United Nations General Assembly Resolution 68/262 that condemned Russia's annexation of Crimea in 2014;
- North Macedonia's accession to NATO in 2020;
- North Macedonia's vote in favor for the United Nations General Assembly Resolution ES-11/1 that condemned Russia's full-scale invasion of Ukraine that started in 2022;
- North Macedonia's support for international sanctions against Russia;
- North Macedonia's lethal military aid sent to Ukraine.

=== Early contacts ===
There were contacts between Russia and the territory of what is now North Macedonia, when the latter was under the harsh Ottoman rule. Motivated by the common Slavic and Orthodox Christian culture, some people from the region of Macedonia moved to the Russian Empire, where the Macedonian Hussar Regiment was formed. This took place in 1759 in Ukraine, which was then ruled by the Russian Empire.

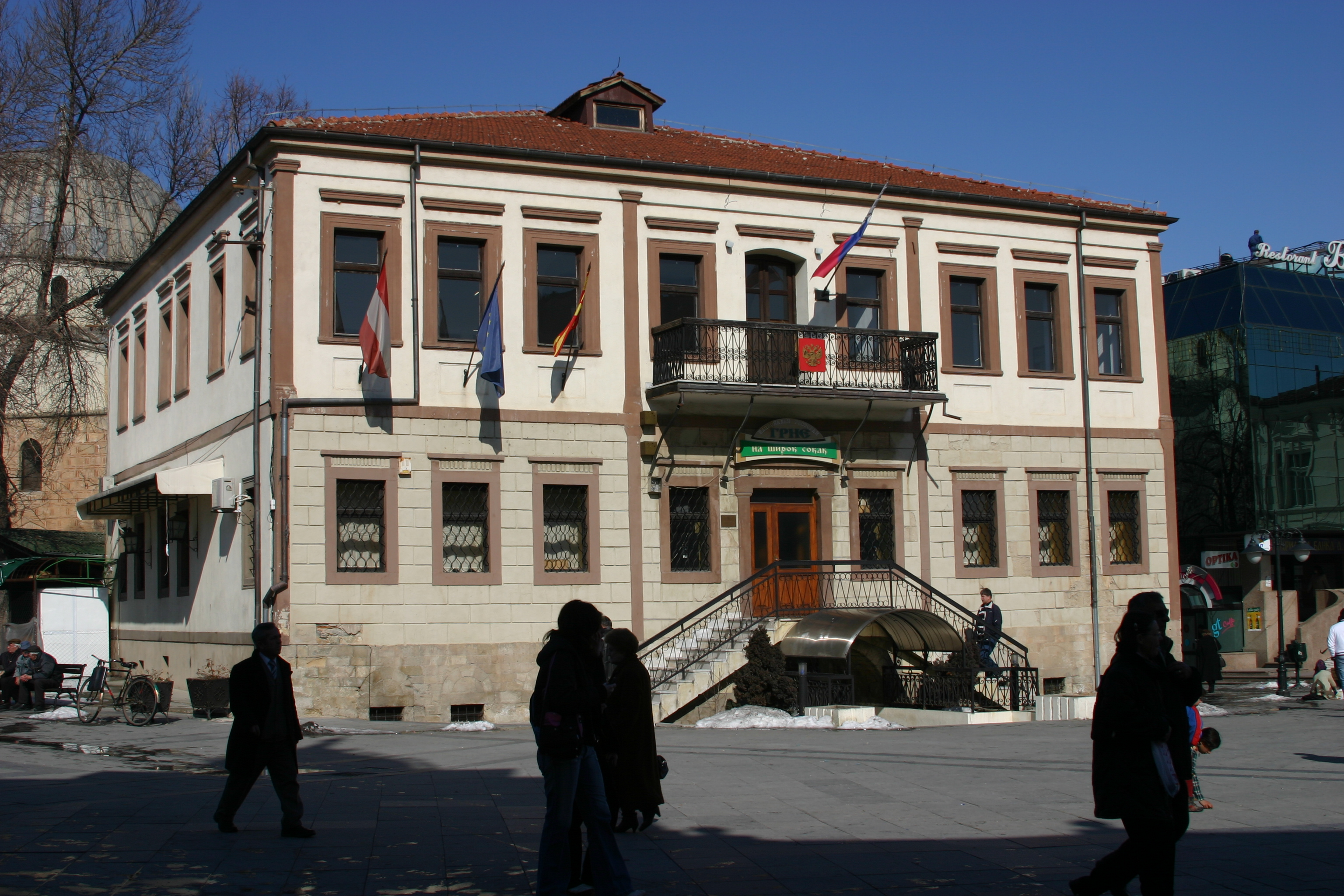
The former Russian consulate in Bitola.

Also, some notable intellectuals and scholars from the region of Macedonia studied in the Russian Empire, such as: Konstantin Miladinov (1830 – 1862), Krste Misirkov (1874 – 1926) and Dimitrija Čupovski (1878 – 1940). In 1902, some of them took part in the establishment of the Macedonian Scientific and Literary Society, which was based in the then capital of Russia, St. Petersburg. They published their newspaper Macedonian Voice that advocated the idea of Independent Macedonia. However, the Russian government did not support this idea. Russia actively supported the liberation movements in neighbouring Ottoman-ruled Greece, Serbia, Montenegro and Bulgaria, but it declined to do so in the region of Macedonia. Russia did not support the Ilinden Uprising that took place in the region in 1903 and considered the Mürzsteg reforms a better solution for the problems of the persecuted Christian subjects in Ottoman Macedonia. The purpose of the reforms was to procure greater rights for them, but also to maintain the integrity of the Ottoman state, which was favourable for the Russian Empire at the moment, but which was threatened by the Internal Macedonian Revolutionary Organization (IMRO) that organized the said uprising. According to certain historians from North Macedonia, the Russian Empire held a hostile stance towards the IMRO and its idea for autonomy or independence of the region.

In 1912, Russia was a prime mover in the establishment of the Balkan League. It was a military alliance of Greece, Serbia, Montenegro and Bulgaria, who expelled the Ottomans from the region of Macedonia and then partitioned its territory among themselves. As a result of this, the territory of what is now North Macedonia fell under oppressive Serbian rule, which continued under the Serbian-dominated Kingdom of Yugoslavia, formed after the First World War.

During the war, Russian troops arrived on the territory of what is now North Macedonia to support their Serbian allies (see: Macedonian front, Monastir offensive and Battle of the Crna Bend).

After the 1917 October Revolution, some white Russian émigrés found refuge in the then Serbian-ruled part of Macedonia, a notable example being the biologist Nikola Nezlobinski (1885 - 1942), known for establishing a natural museum in the city of Struga.

Meanwhile, some IMRO activists, who fought for the idea of an independent and United Macedonia, such as Todor Aleksandrov, Pavel Shatev or Dimitar Vlahov, tried to seek support from the Soviet Union (where Soviet Russia was one of the constituent republics). Such ideas were presented in the May Manifesto of 1924, however, this event was marred with controversies and this did not bring the desired results.

After the fall of the Kingdom of Yugoslavia and the Second World War, the Socialist Federative Republic of Yugoslavia was established with the Socialist Republic of Macedonia as one of its constituent countries (a predecessor of modern North Macedonia). In the beginning, they maintained good relations with the Soviet Union based on the common communist ideology, but this ended with the Tito-Stalin split in 1948. The split resulted in purges and persecution of real or alleged supporters of Stalin and the USSR throughout Yugoslavia. Notable individuals from Yugoslav Macedonia targeted during these purges were the aforementioned Pavel Shatev, Panko Brashnarov and Petre Piruze.

When Khrushchev came to power in the USSR, its relations with Yugoslavia improved, but substantial ideological differences remained and Yugoslavia joined the Non-Aligned Movement. USSR was one of the many countries that provided aid in the form of material and personnel after the Skopje earthquake, that struck the capital of Yugoslav Macedonia on July 26, 1963. On August 22 of the same year, Khrushchev visited Skopje personally.

=== Diplomatic relations ===
Russia recognized North Macedonia as an independent state on August 4, 1992, during president Boris Yeltsin's tenure, about one year after the then Republic of Macedonia's declaration of independence from the Socialist Federal Republic of Yugoslavia. The Russian Federation by that move became the first major power in the world to recognize North Macedonia. The event was also significant because Russia recognized the country by its then constitutional name the Republic of Macedonia that was a subject of a naming dispute. The establishment of full diplomatic relations between the two states took place on January 31, 1994.

Over 40 agreements were signed by North Macedonia and Russia in the first 15 years of their bilateral relations, among them the important Declaration of Friendship and Cooperation in 1998.

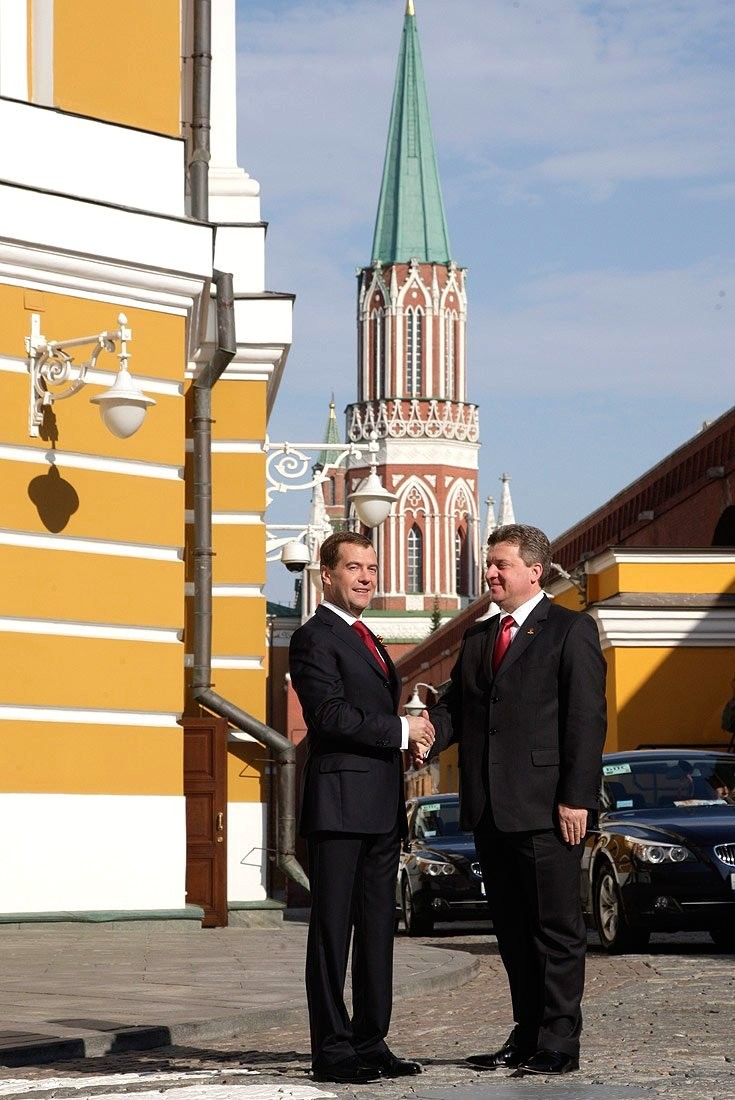
President of North Macedonia Gjorge Ivanov and the President of Russia Dmitry Medvedev on the 2010 Moscow Victory Day Parade.

However, since proclaiming its independence, North Macedonia is pursuing a consistent pro-Western policy. It joined the NATO program Partnership for Peace in 1995; a decade later, it became an official European Union candidate; and in 2020, it became a full NATO member. But some analysts claim that the former prime minister Nikola Gruevski tried to flirt with Moscow, at least during his late tenure. These policy fluctuations are explained as North Macedonia's disillusionment with the West. The European Union and NATO delayed North Macedonia's accession for too long and they are perceived by some ethnic Macedonians as positively biased towards the Albanian minority in the country. North Macedonia has experienced ethnic tensions, where Russia claimed to be a protector of the ethnic Macedonian interests, whereas the West was perceived by some as favouring the Albanians. But despite occasional fluctuations, North Macedonia's policy remains pro-Western. During Gruevski's tenure, his close associate, the then-president of North Macedonia, Gjorgje Ivanov, described the relations with Russia as friendly, but even then they were ambiguous.

On March 27, 2014, North Macedonia approved the United Nations General Assembly Resolution 68/262 that condemned Russia's annexation of Crimea.

The bilateral relations dramatically worsened in the late 2010s, during the process of North Macedonia's accession to NATO. The former Russian ambassador Oleg Shcherbak warned the government of North Macedonia that: "If it came to a conflict between Russia and NATO, you will have the role of a legitimate target". The Defense Minister of North Macedonia at the time, Radmila Šekerinska, accused the Russian government of trying to interfere in North Macedonia's affairs, while its prime minister Zoran Zaev was a target of the pro-Kremlin pranksters Vovan and Lexus. In 2017, some media claimed that Russian spies and diplomats, together with their supporters from Serbia, have been involved in an effort to spread propaganda and provoke discord in North Macedonia with a goal to stop the country from joining NATO and to pry it away from western influence.

On April 2, 2018, North Macedonia expelled Russian diplomats over the poisoning of Sergei and Yulia Skripal. On 18 May 2021, North Macedonia declared a Russian diplomat persona non grata, with the official reasoning being a prior investigation into the behavior of said diplomat and violation of the Vienna Convention. Days after, the Minister of Foreign Affairs of North Macedonia declared that that had been done in solidarity with Bulgaria and the Czech Republic. This was criticised by the Russian Foreign Ministry, which declared the act "hostile". In retaliation, Russia expelled a Macedonian diplomat on 10 June 2021.

On March 2, 2022, North Macedonia approved the United Nations General Assembly Resolution ES-11/1 that condemned Russia's invasion of Ukraine. Five days later, North Macedonia was added to Russia's Unfriendly Countries List for its support of EU's sanctions against Russia. In late March North Macedonia expelled five Russian diplomats, followed shortly after by another six. On June 5, 2022, North Macedonia closed its airspace for Russia's foreign minister Sergei Lavrov, who planned a meeting in neighbouring Serbia. Later, North Macedonia sent lethal military aid to Ukraine, consisting of battle tanks and military aircraft.

As of 2022, there are few russophile political parties in North Macedonia, but their influence and their election results are negligible: Edinstvena Makedonija, led by Janko Bačev; Levica, led by Dimitar Apasiev; and Rodina.

North Macedonia has provided substantial military assistance to Ukraine since Russia started the war.

In September 2023 a further three Russian diplomats were expelled, making 14 in total since February 2022.

North Macedonia's policy is closely aligned with that of the United States. Following Donald Trump's election as US president and subsequent shifts in US policy regarding the Russo-Ukrainian War, North Macedonia co-sponsored a US-proposed UN resolution that reflected the new US stance. This resolution was seen by many as unfavorable to Ukraine and conciliatory toward Russia, however the foreign ministry of North Macedonia said that decisions regarding the country's sponsorship and voting on the UN resolutions should not be interpreted as withdrawal or change of prior positions. North Macedonia continues to support Ukraine.

== Conditional visa-waiver agreement ==
In 2008, North Macedonia and Russia signed a mutual and conditional visa-waiver agreement according to which, a visa was not required if the traveller possesses an original tourist voucher or an official letter of invitation, but if these conditions are not met, a visa is still required. Later, North Macedonia unilaterally lifted these special requirements, giving the Russians a real visa-free access to the country. However, this friendly gesture was not met with reciprocity on the Russian side. For the citizens of North Macedonia, the agreement and its special requirements remained in force. After the 2022 Russian invasion of Ukraine began, North Macedonia ended this visa liberalization for the Russian citizens and went back to the 2008 agreement.

Macedonian citizens now need a Russian eVisa to enter Russia and Russian citizens need a visa to enter North Macedonia.

== Economic relations ==
The pharmaceutical company from North Macedonia, Alkaloid, has a subsidiary in Russia , while the Russian petroleum company Lukoil owns gas stations in North Macedonia. In March 2015, Russian engineering construction company Stroitransgaz announced plans to a build a gas pipeline across North Macedonia, which could eventually be used as part of a route to supply Europe with Russian gas via Turkey.

Stroitransgaz is owned by Gennady Timchenko, an ally of President Vladimir Putin, who was among the first businessmen to be placed under sanctions by the United States in the annexation of Crimea by the Russian Federation. A spokesman for Stroitransgaz said the sanctions would not hamper the project in North Macedonia, which is not a member of the European Union.

The 96.6 km (60.0 mi) Negotino-Klečovce gas pipeline will cross North Macedonia from near the Greek border in the south up to the vicinity of the Serbian border in the north. Stroitransgaz will build 61 km (38 mi) of the link by June 2016.

Moscow plans to build an undersea pipeline to Turkey, a replacement for the cancelled South Stream project via Bulgaria. The details of an onward route from Turkey through Greece have not been finalised.

Stroitransgaz said it will carry out its work as part of the repayment of the outstanding debt between the former Soviet Union and the former Yugoslavia, of which North Macedonia was a member. The cost of the entire project stands at $75.7 million.

The project has added to tensions between the West and Russia. Following violent interethnic clashes in the northern city of Kumanovo on 9 May 2015, Russian Foreign Minister Sergei Lavrov accused the West of trying to incite an overthrow of the government of North Macedonia in order to undermine the project.

After a meeting between officials from North Macedonia and Russia in March 2016, it was announced that the government of North Macedonia is interested in increasing Russian tourism in the country. The government of North Macedonia is working to create good conditions for Russian tourists and in establishing regular airfare between the two countries.

In 2021 Russia exported goods worth $154m to North Macedonia, primarily gas, with North Macedonia exporting $74m of goods in the same year, mainly medication.

== Resident diplomatic missions ==
- North Macedonia has an embassy in Moscow.
- Russia has an embassy in Skopje.

== See also ==
- Foreign relations of North Macedonia
- Foreign relations of Russia
- Accession of North Macedonia to the European Union
- North Macedonia–NATO relations
- Soviet Union–Yugoslavia relations
- List of ambassadors of Russia to North Macedonia
