= Soviet Union–Yugoslavia relations =

- Soviet Union: Yugoslavia

Soviet Union–Yugoslavia relations
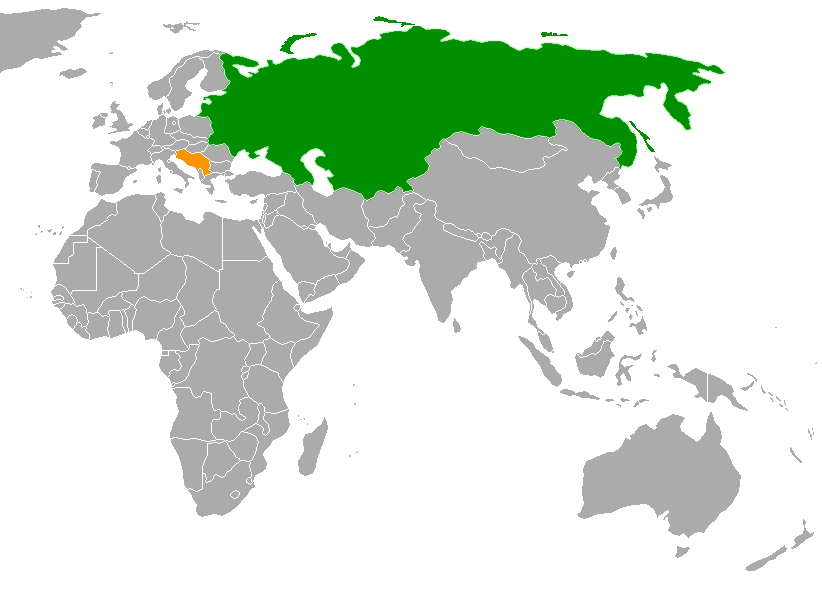

- Soviet Union: Yugoslavia

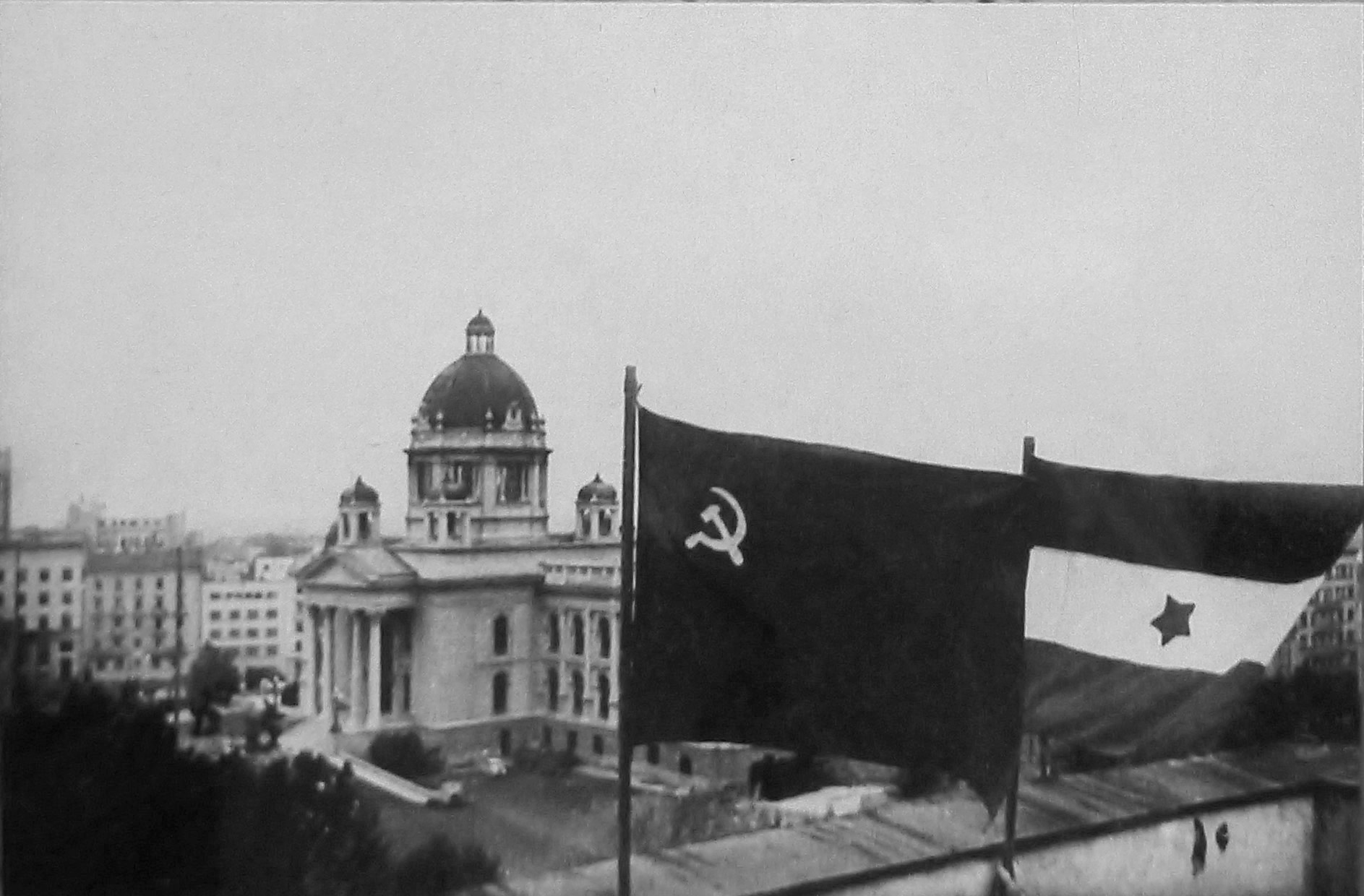
Flags of the USSR and Yugoslavia in front of the House of the National Assembly in Belgrade in 1944.

Soviet Union–Yugoslavia relations (Russian: Советско-югославские отношения; Serbo-Croatian: Odnosi Sovjetskog Saveza i Jugoslavije, Односи Совјетског Савеза и Југославије; Slovene: Odnosi med Sovjetsko zvezo in Jugoslavijo; Macedonian: Односите Советски Сојуз-Југославија) were the historical foreign relations between the Soviet Union and Yugoslavia (both the Kingdom of Yugoslavia 1918–1941 and the Socialist Federal Republic of Yugoslavia 1945–1992). Both states became defunct with the dissolution of the Soviet Union between 1988 and 1991 and the breakup of Yugoslavia between 1991 and 1992. Relations between the two countries developed very ambiguously. Until 1940 they were openly hostile, and in 1948 they deteriorated. In 1949 relations between the Soviet Union and Yugoslavia completely deteriorated. From 1953–1955, bilateral relations were restored with the signing of the Belgrade declaration, but until the collapse of Yugoslavia they remained very restrained. Relations with Soviet Union were a high priority for Belgrade as good relations, or lack thereof, helped the country to develop the principle of Cold War equidistance on which the Yugoslav non-alignment policy was based.

While geographically not close, two countries were both predominantly Slavic with significant shared Eastern Orthodox Christian traditions which were particularly reflected in historical pre-World War I relations between Russian Empire with Principality of Serbia and Principality of Montenegro. Significant historical, cultural and political links were nevertheless not reflected in close bilateral relations with tensions and strategic divisions continuing almost throughout the existence of Yugoslavia and the Soviet Union. It was not until June 1940 that the Kingdom of Yugoslavia formally recognised the USSR and established diplomatic relations, one of the last European countries to do so.

In the 1960s and 1980s, the trade between the two countries was significant and grew up until 1985. The USSR became a major consumer of Yugoslav cultural products with publication of translations of books by Yugoslav writers, and it became a major consumer of Yugoslav movies as well.

While in the case of Soviet Union, the Russian Federation was internationally recognized as a sole successor state, there was shared succession in the case of Yugoslavia with five sovereign equal successor states which were formed upon the dissolution of the federation. Serbia and the Russian Federation nevertheless recognize the continuity of all inter-State documents signed between the two countries since 1940. Croatia, using the principle and legislative procedure for of state succession, formally recognizes some of the old agreements such as the 1955 Agreement on Scientific and Technical Cooperation, 1974 Agreement on Cultural, Scientific and Educational Cooperation, and the 1988 Agreement on Higher Education Qualifications Recognition.

== History ==
=== Interwar period ===
After the Russian Civil War ended in 1922 in a Bolshevik victory, relations between the interwar Kingdom of Yugoslavia and the Soviet Union remained frosty. Starting from 1920, the government of the Kingdom of SHS welcomed tens of thousands of anti-Bolshevik Russian refugees, mainly those who fled after the final defeat of the Russian Army under General Pyotr Wrangel in Crimea in November 1920, explaining its hospitality by presenting it as paying back the debt Serbia owed Russia for the latter's intervention on the side of Serbia at the outbreak of WWI. The Kingdom of SHS became home for 40 000 exiles from the Russian Empire. In 1921, at the invitation of the Serbian Patriarch Dimitrije, the leadership of the Russian Church in exile moved from Constantinople to Serbia and in September 1922 in Karlovci (until 1920, the seat of the abolished Patriarchate of Karlovci) established a de facto independent ecclesiastical administration that a few years later was instituted as the Russian Orthodox Church Outside Russia (ROCOR).

=== World War II ===
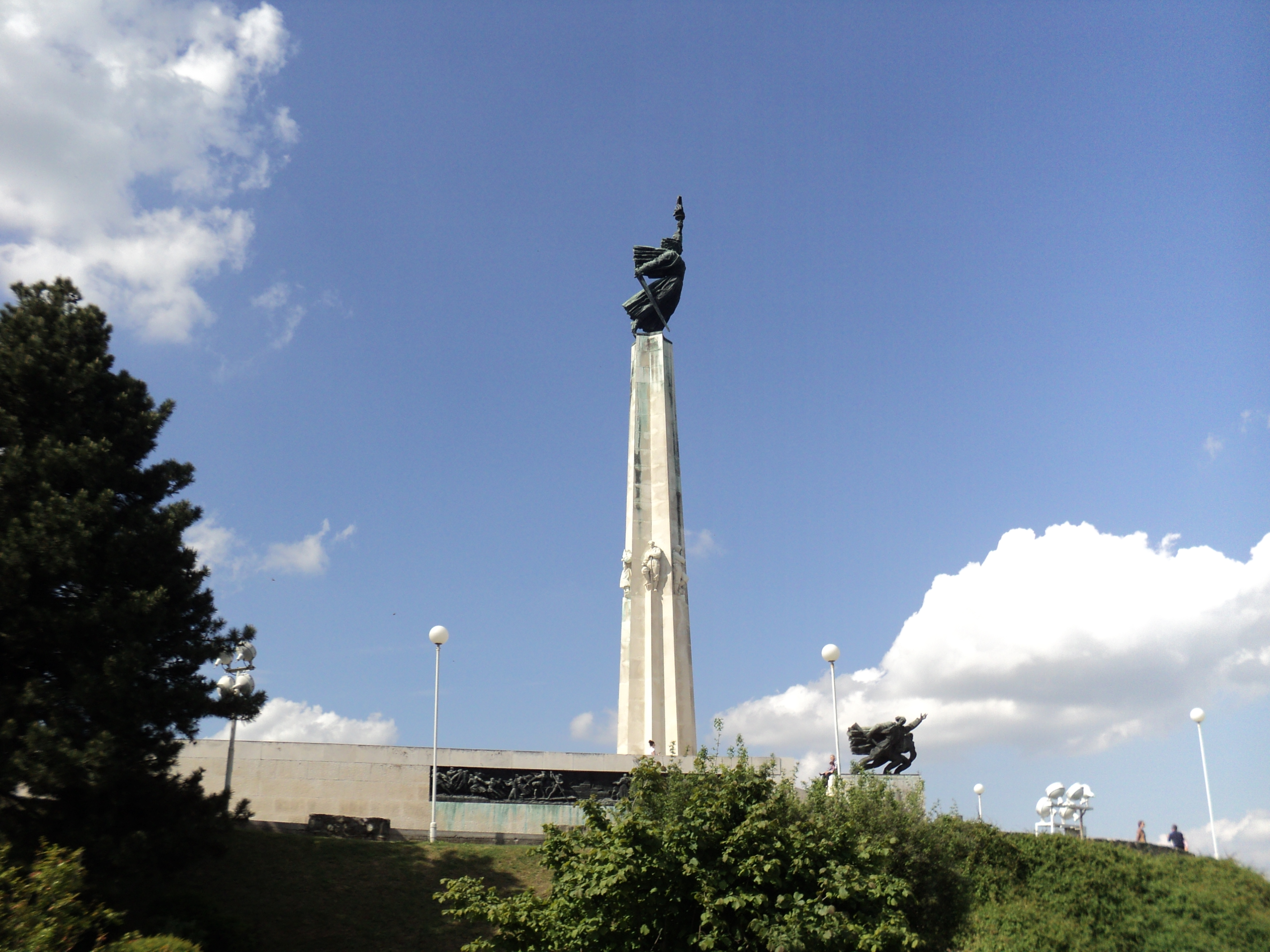
Monument to the Battle of Batina in Batina by Antun Augustinčić

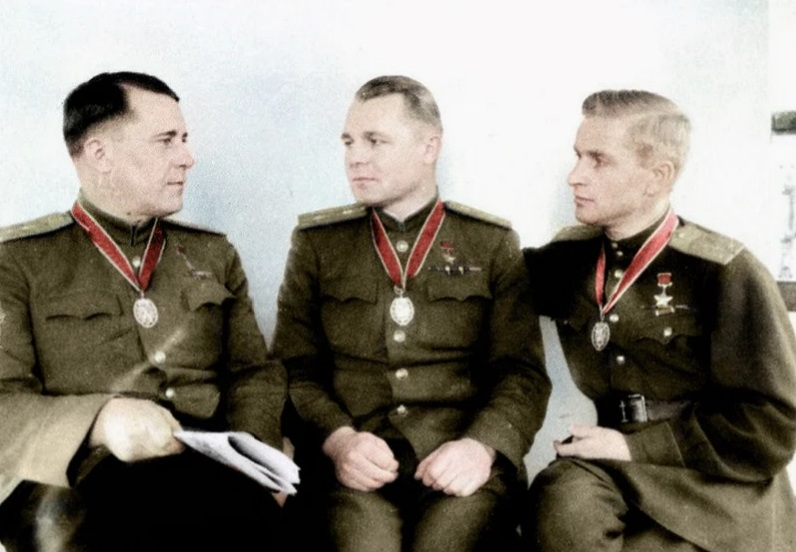
Soviet generals Yakimov, Shornikov and Kalinkin, recipients of the Order of the People's Hero

Following military success by Yugoslav Partisans the new authorities in the country wanted to gain international recognition by the Soviet Union, United Kingdom and the United States in opposition to the Yugoslav government in exile. Moscow and London were well informed about the events during the World War II in Yugoslavia already in fall of 1941. Ahead of the Moscow Conference in October 1943 Tito informed Soviet authorities that his movement does not recognize the Government in exile and that they will prevent the King of Yugoslavia in any effort to return to the country as it may initiate a civil war. Moscow was restrained and reserved in its support to Yugoslav Partisans in fear that it may antagonize western allies. Soviets were therefore irritated by radicalism of the Second Session of the Anti-Fascist Council for the National Liberation of Yugoslavia which was organized without any prior consultations with the Soviet Union. The Soviet military also assisted by sending arm shipments to the Yugoslav partisans mainly guns and submachine pieces. Soviet military mission to Yugoslav Partisans arrived in February 1944, at the time when there already was already British mission since February 1942. Tito left the island of Vis on 19 September 1944 and on 21 September he met with Stalin in Moscow. With support in logistics and air power from the Western Allies, and Soviet ground troops in the final stage of the war during the Belgrade offensive, the Partisans eventually gained control of the entire country and of the border regions of Trieste and Carinthia. While Soviet support at the final stage of war was significant, particularly in the northeast of the country (Vojvodina, Slavonia, Belgrade), Yugoslav communists, unlike most Eastern European communists, did not base their victory primarily upon the Red Army offensive. The Soviet Union agreed not to treat northern liberated parts of Yugoslavia as occupied territories (like the rest of the territories in Europe) and that the daily life will be organized by the local civil administration. During the six months of the Red Army's presence in Yugoslavia civil authorities received reports on 1219 rape cases, 359 rape attempts, 111 murder, 248 attempts to murder and 1204 robberies with injured individuals. Tito expressed his anger with such developments and with efforts to recruit Yugoslav soldiers and police officers into Soviet secret services. During the meeting with Andrija Hebrang in January 1945 Stalin referred to reports of inappropriate behavior, but underlined that those were isolated cases. Later that year, during the new meeting between Stalin and Tito, Yugoslav leader once again complained about rape cases in Belgrade which left Soviet leader without a word.

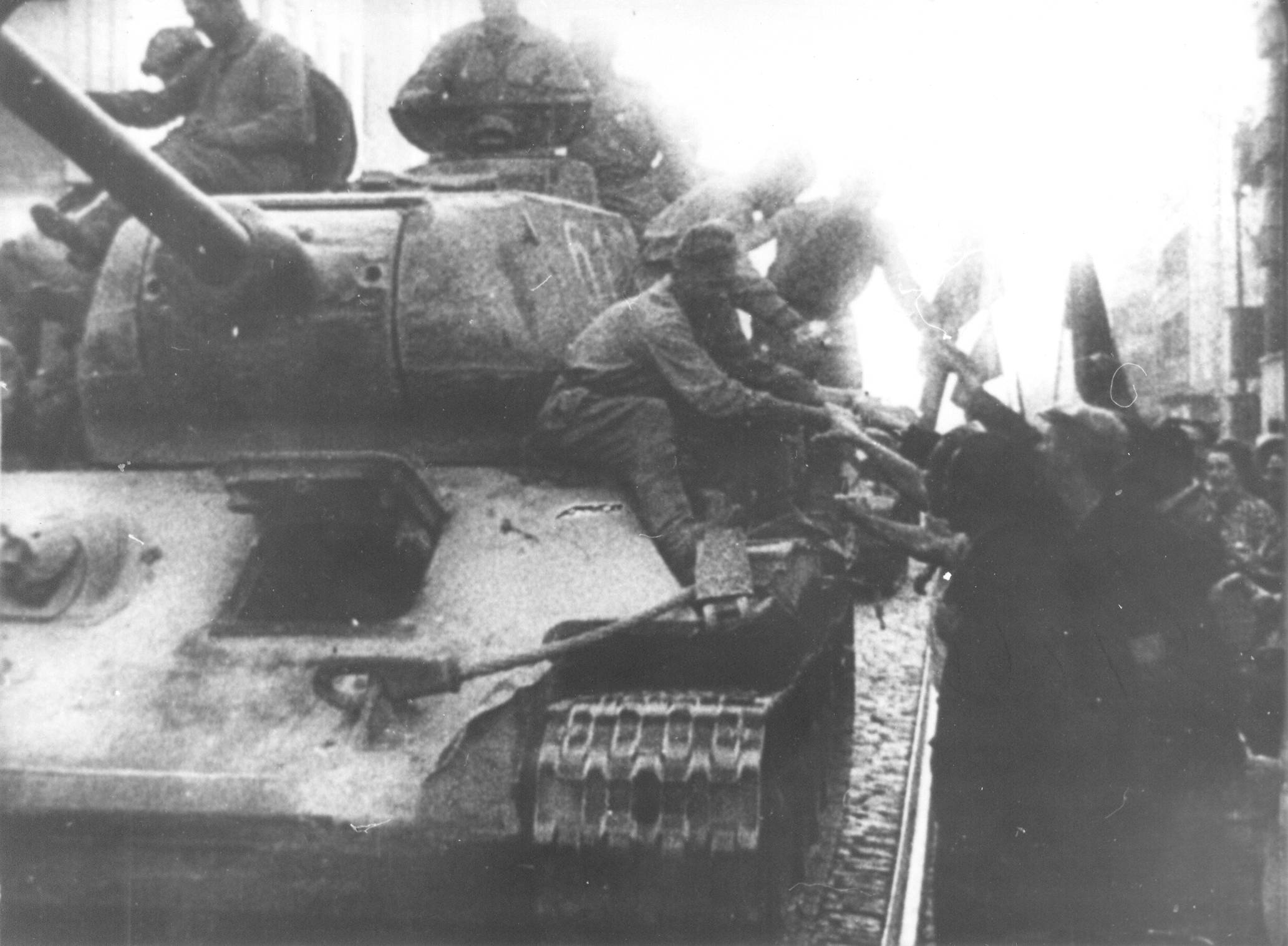
Red Army welcome in liberated Belgrade in October 1944

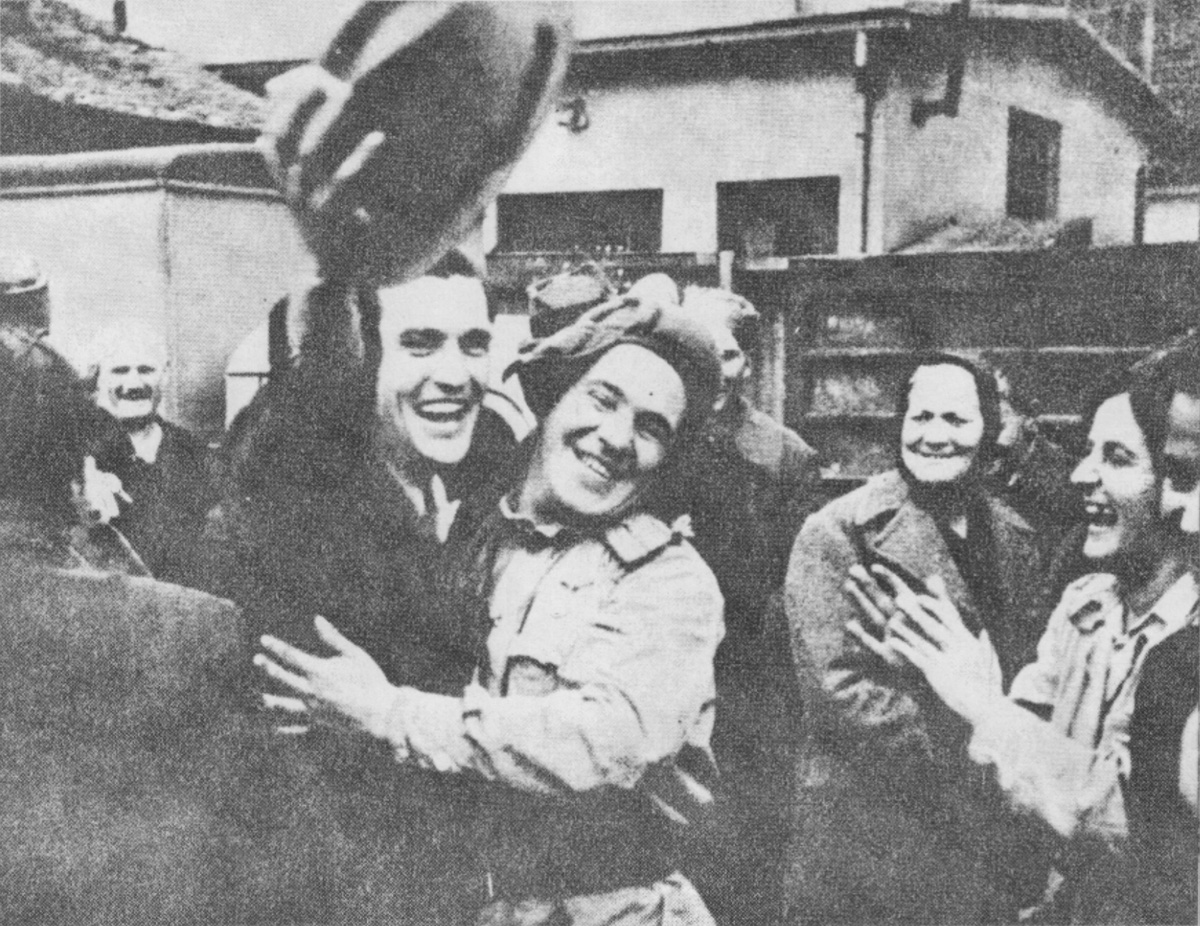
Liberation of Belgrade 1944

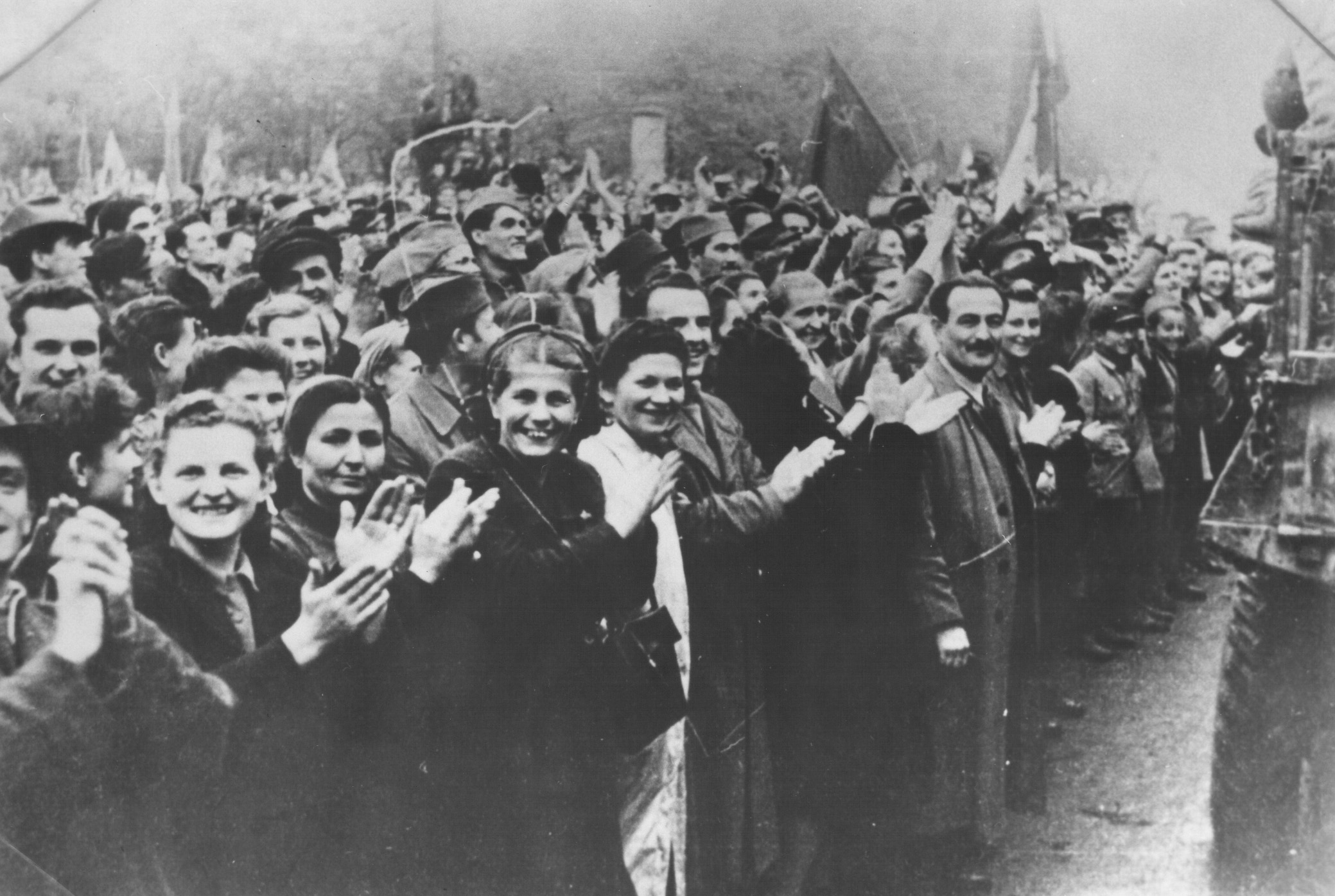
Liberation of Belgrade 1944

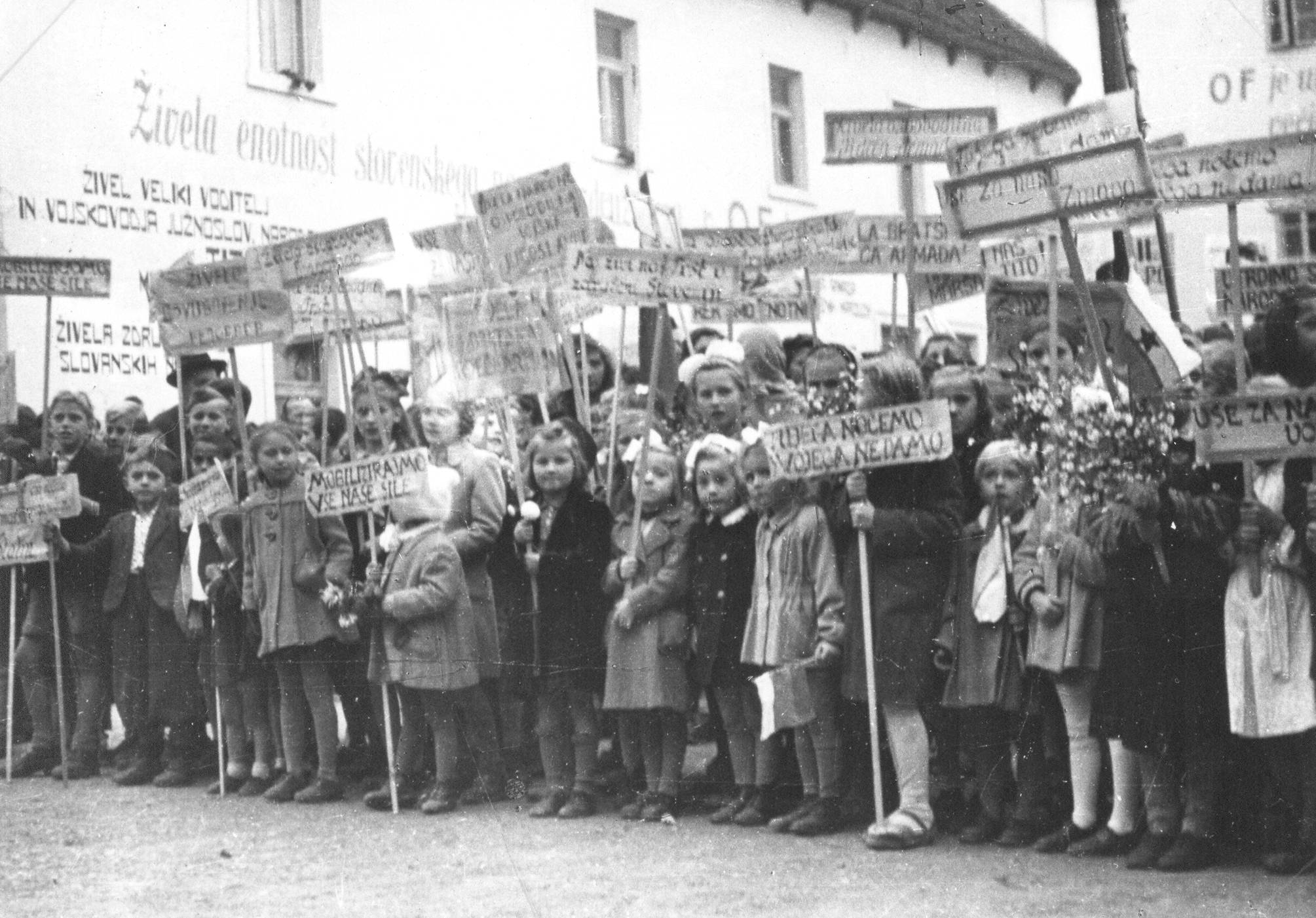
Celebration of the Liberation of Belgrade in Slovenia

=== Cold War ===
==== The period of rapprochement 1945–1948 ====
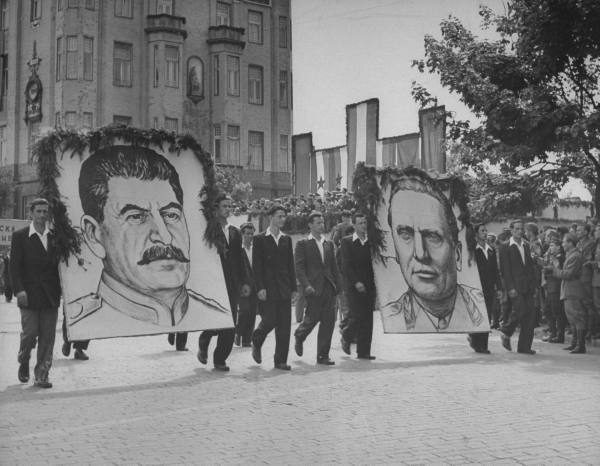
Belgrade, 1946

Socialist Yugoslavia (declared on 29 November 1945) was recognized by the USSR on 19 December of the same year. In November 1945 President of Yugoslavia Josip Broz Tito gave an interview to the Times in which he underlined that "Yugoslav people have warm and profound sympathy, friendship and brotherhood with the peoples of Soviet Union. But there is nothing exclusive about it." stressing the country's intention to maintain independence. From 1945 until 1948 Yugoslavia signed treaties of friendship and mutual assistance with almost all East European states. Yugoslavia and Soviet Union signed their Treaty of Friendship and Cooperation on 11 April 1945, in Moscow. Cominform was initially located in Belgrade.

==== 1948 Tito–Stalin split ====
In the first two years following the war, relations between FPRY and the Soviet leadership, which during that period sought to accommodate the USSR's Western allies demands in Europe, were not entirely free of disagreements on a number of issues, such as Yugoslavia's territorial claims to Italy's Free Territory of Trieste and the part of Austria's Carinthia populated by Carinthian Slovenes, Tito's efforts to play a leading role in the entire Balkans region, as well as the issue of material support to the Greek Communist-led Democratic Army in the Greek Civil War, partially provided by Yugoslavia even after the 1948 split. Drastic deterioration in relations occurred in early 1948. The assumption in Moscow was that once it was known that he had lost Soviet approval, Tito would collapse. The expulsion effectively banished Yugoslavia from the international association of socialist states, while other socialist states of Eastern Europe subsequently underwent purges of alleged "Titoists". Faced with East Bloc economic embargo and the possibility of a military attack Yugoslavia sought assistance from the West, mainly the United States. Stalin took the matter personally and attempted, unsuccessfully, to assassinate Tito on several occasions. Tito's successful resistance to Stalin in 1948 increased his popularity both in Yugoslavia and around the world and defined future Soviet–Yugoslavia relations. With deterioration of relations Yugoslav representation at the United Nations even accused the Soviet Union of having started the Korean War.

==== Normalization of relations in de-Stalinization period ====
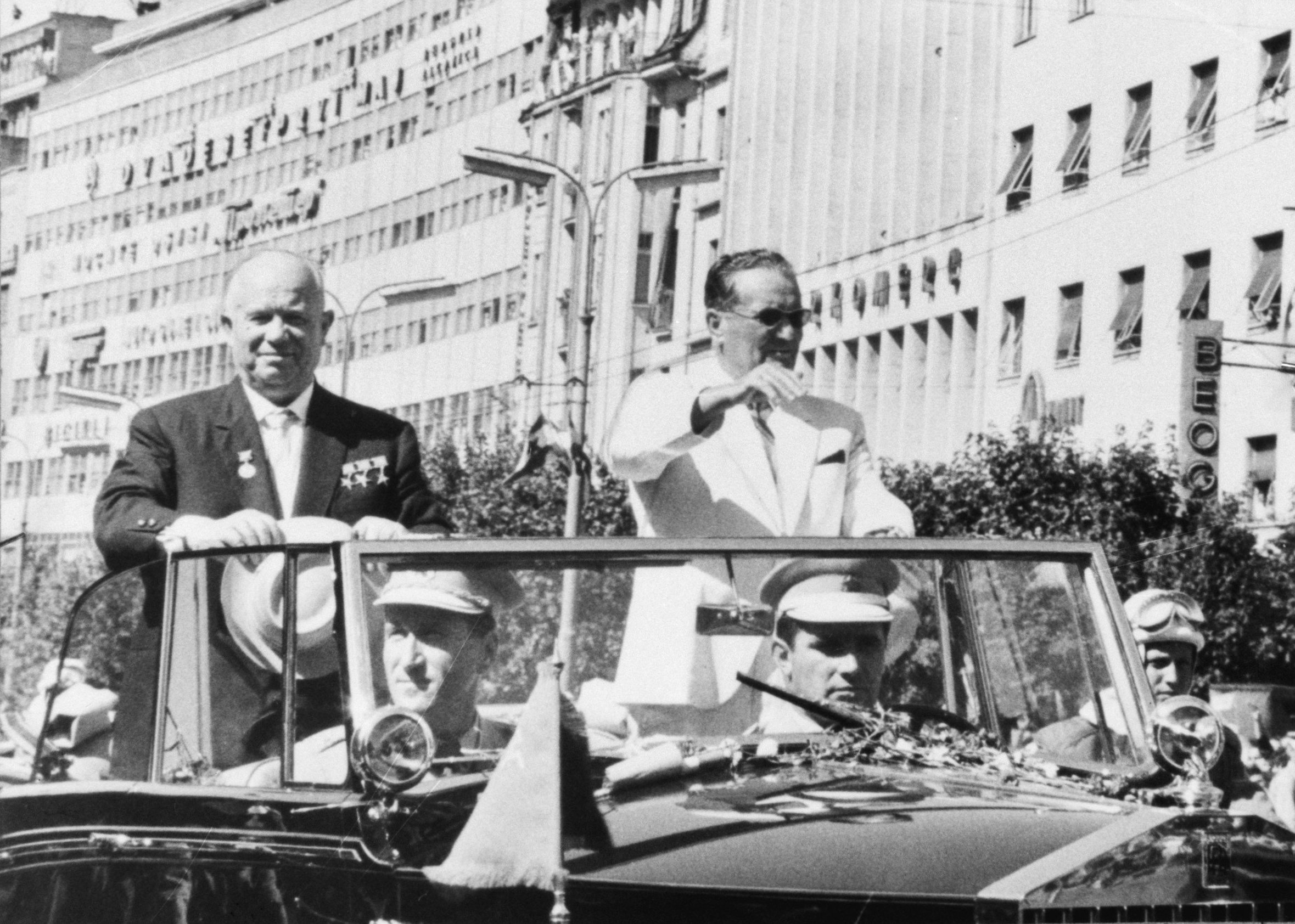
Nikita Khrushchev and Josip Broz Tito in Belgrade in 1963

Yugoslav–Soviet normalization following Stalin's death was influenced by the process of De-Stalinization, creation of the Non-Aligned Movement and was symbolized in an exchange of letters in March 1955 when Tito and Khrushchev agreed to meet in Belgrade.

Socialist self-management, while never formally adopted by any East Bloc state, was a popular idea in Polish People's Republic, Czechoslovak Socialist Republic and Hungarian People's Republic.

President of Yugoslavia Tito even attended the 1967 Conference of the Warsaw Pact (the only time the President of Yugoslavia was present) in an effort to convince Eastern Bloc countries to support Yugoslav Non-Aligned ally Egypt in Six-Day War while Yugoslavia also permitted member states to use its airspace to deliver military aid.

The new period of antagonism was initiated in 1968 with the Warsaw Pact invasion of Czechoslovakia. Contrary to Yugoslav verbal support to Soviet intervention in Hungary in 1956, Yugoslavia strongly condemned the invasion of Czechoslovakia which was perceived as a particularly close country. On 12 July 1968 President of Yugoslavia Josip Broz Tito gave an interview to Egyptian daily Al-Ahram where he stated that he believes that Soviet leaders are not "such short-sighted people [...] who would pursue a policy of force to resolve the internal affairs of Czechoslovakia". President Tito visited Prague on 9 and 10 August 1968, just days before the intervention while large group of 250,000 demonstrators gathered in Belgrade once the intervention started. Yugoslavia provided refuge for numerous Czechoslovak citizens (many on holidays) and politicians including Ota Šik, Jiří Hájek, František Vlasak and Štefan Gašparik. During and after the invasion thousands of citizens of Czechoslovakia used Yugoslavia as the most important paths of emigration to the Western countries.

Relations improved once again following the 24th Congress of the Communist Party of the Soviet Union in 1971 with the Soviet new international policy strategy towards the United States and the Non-aligned movement and Yugoslavia’s positive attitude towards Soviet policy of deescalation and cooperation with the West. On 5 June 1972 Josip Broz Tito received the Order of Lenin, the highest national order of the Soviet Union.

Yugoslav diplomacy was once again alarmed by the 1979 Soviet intervention in Afghanistan, which similarly to Yugoslavia was at the time a non-aligned and socialist country outside of the Warsaw Pact. Yugoslavia officially condemned Soviet intervention and expressed "astonishment" and "deep concern" about developments in Afghanistan. The intervention happened when President of Yugoslavia Josip Broz Tito health situation deteriorated with perception that Moscow is waiting for Tito to die in order to renew its pressure on Belgrade.

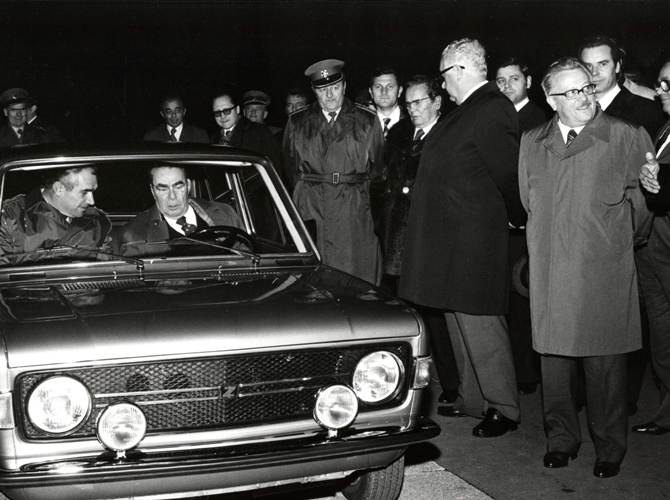
Leonid Brezhnev at Zastava Automobiles in Kragujevac in 1976

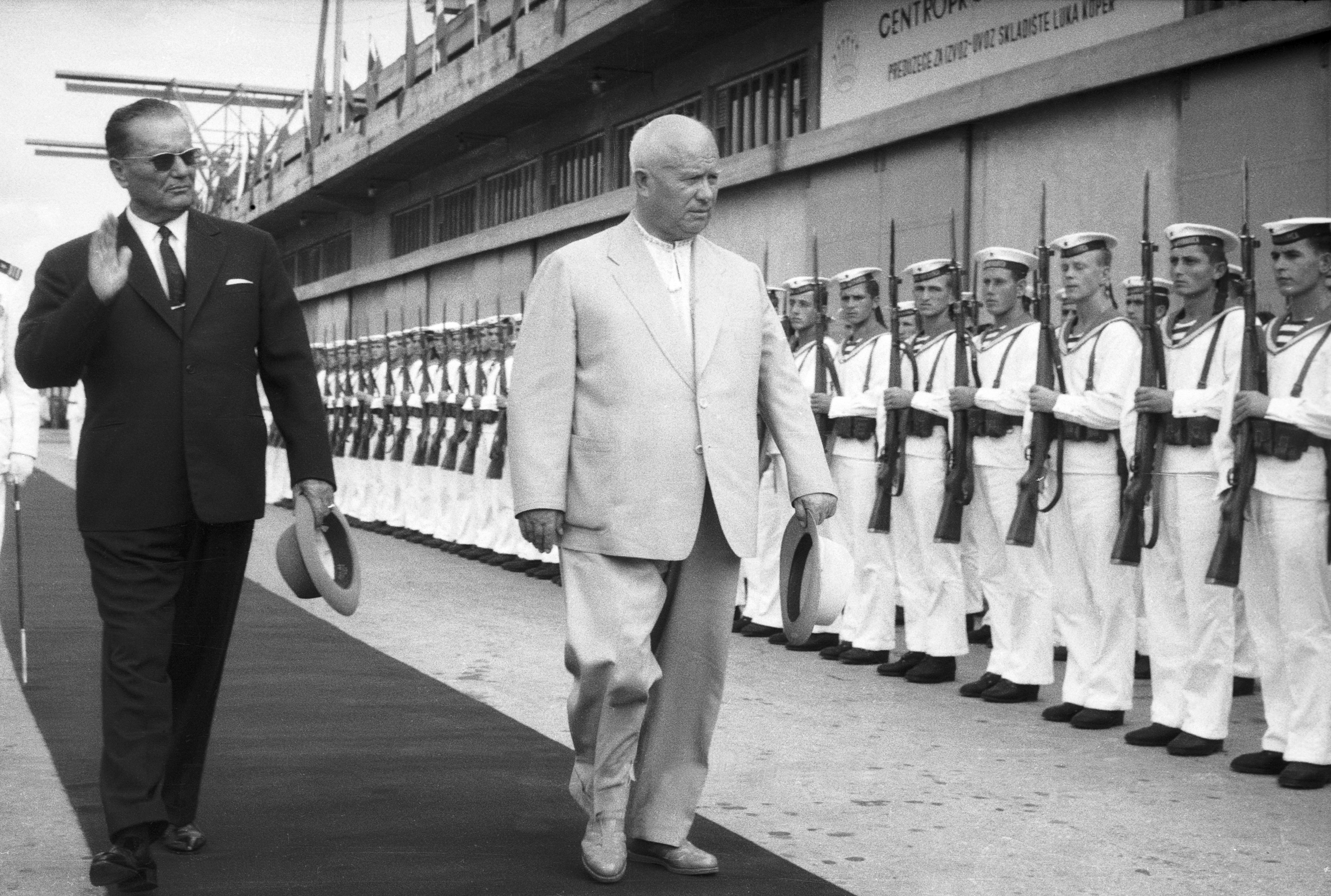
Nikita Khrushchev in Koper in 1963

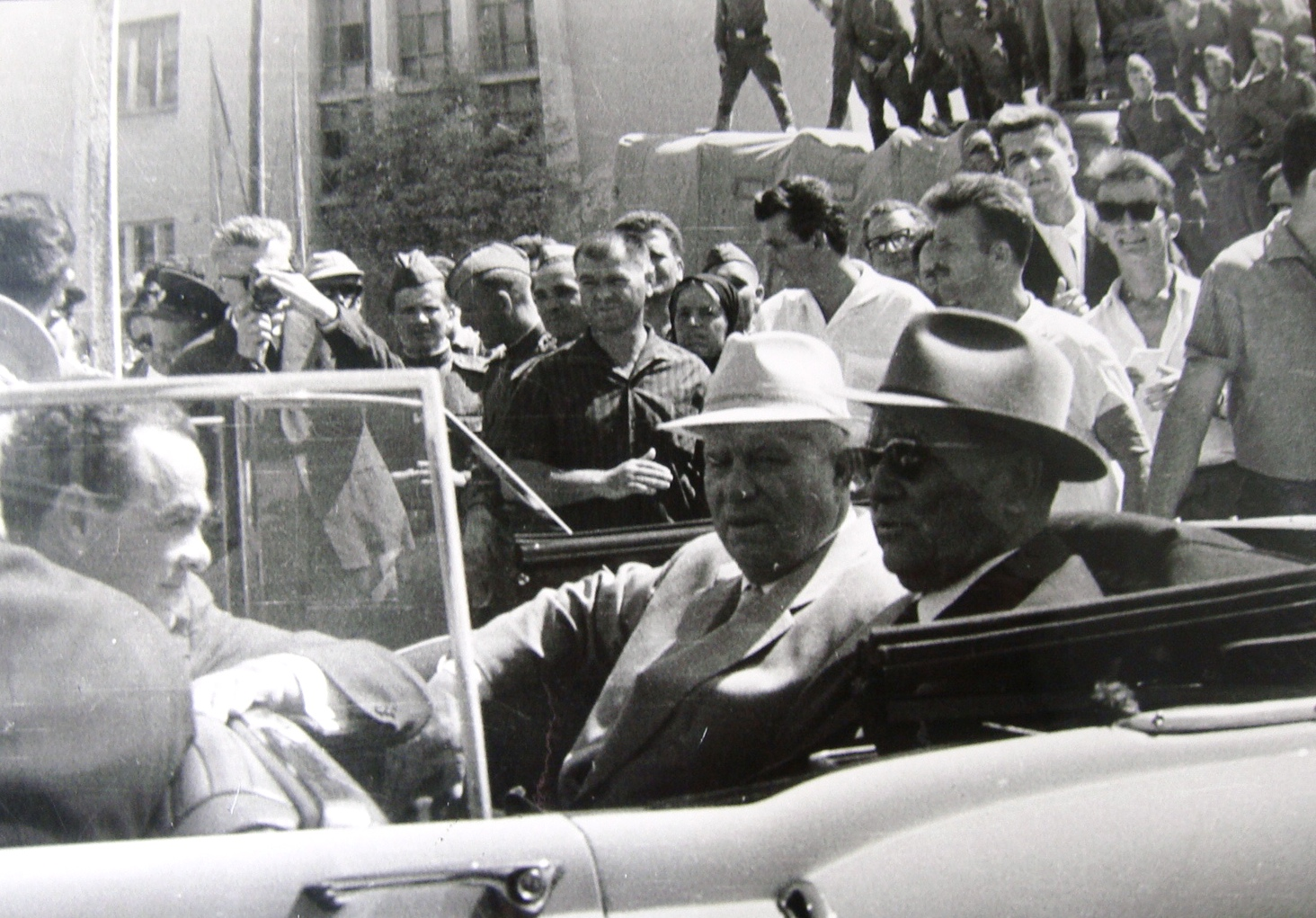
Tito and Khrushchev in Skopje in 1963

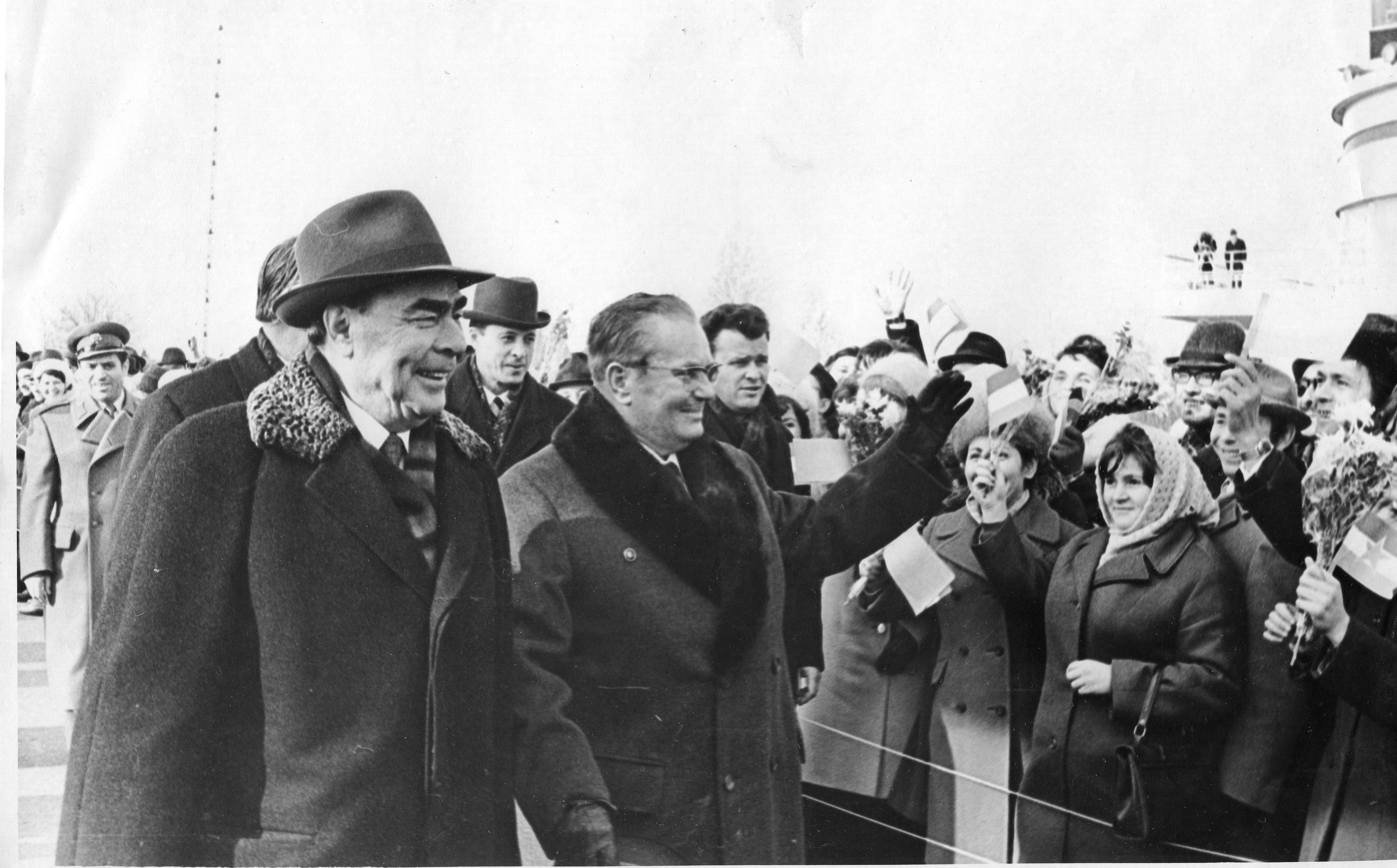
Leonid Brezhnev and Josip Broz Tito in Kyiv in 1973

== See also ==
- Foreign relations of the Soviet Union
- Foreign relations of Yugoslavia
- Soviet Union at the 1984 Winter Olympics
- Yugoslavia at the 1980 Summer Olympics
- Russia's reaction to the 2008 Kosovo declaration of independence
- Bosnia and Herzegovina–Russia relations
- Croatia–Russia relations
- Kosovo–Russia relations
- Montenegro–Russia relations
- North Macedonia–Russia relations
- Russia–Serbia relations
- Russia–Slovenia relations

== Sources ==
- Škiljan, Filip (2014). Rusi u Hrvatskoj [Russians in Croatia] (in Croatian). Zagreb: Savez Rusa u Republici Hrvatskoj. ISBN 9789535832706.
- Goldstein, Ivo; Goldstein, Slavko (2020). Tito [Tito] (in Croatian). Zagreb: Profil. ISBN 978-953-313-750-6.
