= Nenad Joldeski =

Macedonian writer

Nenad Joldeski (born 1986) is a Macedonian writer, poet and recipient of the 2016 European Union Prize for Literature. He is the author of two short-story collections, a novella and a poetry collection.

== Early life and education ==
Joldeski was born in Struga in 1986. He graduated from the Faculty of Economics in Skopje in 2010 and obtained a master's degree in comparative literature from the Faculty of Philology at the Ss. Cyril and Methodius University of Skopje in 2013. His master's thesis examined intertextual irony in modern and postmodern short fiction.

== Literary career ==
His debut short-story collection, The Silence of Enhalon (Штамата на Енхалон, 2009), was written in the Struga dialect and sociolect. It received the Novite Award for best debut prose work, presented by the Macedonian publishing house Templum.

His second collection, Each with Their Own Lake (Секој со своето езеро, 2012), received the European Union Prize for Literature in 2016 and has been translated into several languages.

In 2018, Joldeski published the novella Swimming Upstream (Пливање спротиводно) through the publishing house Ili-Ili.

His first poetry collection, The Way We Fall (Како паѓаме јас и ти), was published by Begemot in 2026. The collection explores themes of collapse, transformation, loss and love. It was presented at the ArtArea literary festival in September 2026.

Joldeski has also worked in theatre as a member of the Vezdenski artistic group, adapting works including Daniil Kharms's The Old Woman and Dimitrie Duracovski's Insomnia for amateur theatrical productions.

He edited the short-story anthology Nikolaj (Fiction. Water. Truth), dedicated to the Russian-born physician Nikola Nezlobinski.

His short fiction has appeared in literary journals and online publications, including Words Without Borders.

== Bibliography ==
=== Short-story collections ===
- The Silence of Enhalon (Штамата на Енхалон), Templum, 2009
- Each with Their Own Lake (Секој со своето езеро), Templum, 2012

=== Novellas ===
- Swimming Upstream (Пливање спротиводно), Ili-Ili, 2018

=== Poetry ===
- The Way We Fall (Како паѓаме јас и ти), Begemot, 2026

== Awards ==
- 2009 – Novite Award, for The Silence of Enhalon
- 2016 – European Union Prize for Literature, for Each with Their Own Lake
