= Russia's reaction to the 2008 Kosovo declaration of independence =

Kosovo's declaration of independence from Serbia was enacted on Sunday, 17 February 2008 by a unanimous vote of the Assembly of Kosovo. All 11 representatives of the Serb minority boycotted the proceedings. International reaction was mixed, and the world community continues to be divided on the issue of the international recognition of Kosovo. The Russian Federation's reaction to the 2008 Kosovo Declaration of Independence is one of strong opposition.

== Reaction ==
In February 2008, the Russian Foreign Ministry stated that "Kosovo’s Provisional Institutions of Self-Government declared a unilateral proclamation of independence of the province, thus violating the sovereignty of the Republic of Serbia, the Charter of the United Nations, UNSCR 1244, the principles of the Helsinki Final Act, Kosovo’s Constitutional Framework and the high-level Contact Group accords". It further said that Russia fully supports Serbia's territorial integrity and that they expect both the United Nations and NATO will "take immediate action to fulfill their mandates as authorized by the Security Council, including voiding the decisions of Pristina's self-governing institutions and adopting severe administrative measures against them". It also requested that a UN Security Council emergency meeting be held to discuss the issue and that "those who are considering supporting separatism should understand what dangerous consequences their actions threaten to have for world order, international stability and the authority of the UN Security Council's decisions that took decades to build". Russian President Vladimir Putin described the recognition of Kosovo's independence by several major world powers as "a terrible precedent, which will de facto blow apart the whole system of international relations, developed not over decades, but over centuries", and that "they have not thought through the results of what they are doing. At the end of the day it is a two-ended stick and the second end will come back and hit them in the face". During an official state visit to Serbia following the declaration, Russian President-elect Dmitry Medvedev reiterated support for Serbia and its stance on Kosovo.

In March 2008, Russia said that the recent violence in Tibet is linked with the recognition by some states of the independence of Serbia's breakaway province, Kosovo. Foreign Minister Sergey Lavrov, in an interview with a Russian newspaper, also linked the demands for greater autonomy by ethnic Albanians in Macedonia with the Kosovo issue. Lavrov said, "There are ground[s] to presume that this is not occurring by chance. You can see what is happening in Tibet, how the separatists there are acting. The Albanians in Macedonia are already demanding a level of autonomy that is a clear step toward independence. Furthermore, events in other areas of the world give us grounds to assume that we are only at the beginning of a very precarious process".

On 23 March 2008, Putin ordered urgent humanitarian aid for Kosovo Serb enclaves. The Prime Minister of Kosovo, Hashim Thaçi, opposed this plan, stating that Russia could only send aid if it were agreed and coordinated with Government in Pristina.

On 15 July 2008, President of Russia Dmitry Medvedev stated in a major foreign policy speech "For the EU, Kosovo is almost what Iraq is to the United States... This is the latest example of the undermining of international law".

On 19 February 2009, Hashim Thaçi announced that Russia is planning the recognition of Kosovo. The Minister Lavrov responded on the following day by saying "I think Mr. Thaci is indulging in wishful thinking... Mr. Thaci is the last person to make statements on behalf of the Russian Federation" and that "When discussing the problem of Kosovo, the Russian side confirms that our position remains the same and supports the settlement of this problem in accordance with Security Council Resolution 1244. Our support for Serbia's course of action in defending its sovereignty and territorial integrity also stays firm".

On 29 May 2009, President Medvedev described Serbia as a "key partner" for Russia in Southeast Europe and announced "We intend to continue to coordinate our foreign policy moves in future, including the ones related to the solving of the issue with Kosovo".

Russian ambassador to Serbia Aleksandr Konuzin told a Belgrade daily in June 2009 that "Russia's stand is rather simple — we are ready to back whatever position Serbia takes (with regards to Kosovo)."

In September 2009, Vitaly Churkin when asked by journalists why Abkhazia and South Ossetia should be internationally recognised and Kosovo not, said that "the strongest argument is the fact that at the time when Kosovo's authorities made the UDI, nobody was threatening them or putting them in a position where they had to secede. On the contrary, Belgrade even went so far as to refrain from exerting any military or economic pressure on Pristina."

On 29 November 2009, Ambassador Konuzin said that Russia will continue to help Serbia "defend its sovereignty and territorial integrity". He also said that "Kosovo echoes in the hearts of all Russians with the same pain as it does in your hearts".

During the debate before the ICJ in December 2009, Russia said that general international law prevents Kosovo from declaring independence and that the people of Kosovo do not enjoy a right to self-determination. Russia also rejected the claims coming from those countries who support the unilateral declaration that international law "does not regulate independence declarations", and reminded that the UNSC declared Northern Cyprus and Rhodesia's independence to be illegal, since secession is forbidden outside the colonial context.

In March 2014, Russia used Kosovo's declaration of independence as a justification for recognizing the independence of Crimea, citing the so-called "Kosovo independence precedent".

In September 2020, Kosovo and Serbia agreed for economic normalisation with Donald Trump brokering. Though Russia has openly supported Serbia over Kosovo and has still maintained it, Russia also welcomed the normalisation between two nations, signalling another thaw in problematic Kosovan–Russian relations.

== See also ==
- Kosovo–Russia relations
- Russia–Serbia relations
- International recognition of Kosovo
