= Kosovo–Russia relations =

- Kosovo: Russia

Kosovo and Russia do not have official relations due to Russia's support for Serbia in the Kosovo issue. However, the relationship between the two nations has been relatively cold, although relations have been warming in recent years.

== History ==
Following the 2008 Kosovo declaration of independence, Russia immediately took a pro-Serbian stance, and strongly opposed to the independence of Kosovo. Opposition against Kosovo's independence since then have been remained even after the end of Vladimir Putin's first term as Russian President.

The relationship between Kosovo and Russia is shaped by a combination of geopolitical, historical, and diplomatic factors, primarily revolving around Russia's steadfast opposition to Kosovo's independence. This complex relationship remains a key issue in the broader international context of the Western Balkans, where the legacy of the 1990s conflicts still reverberates.

Background and Russia's Position on Kosovo's Independence Kosovo declared its independence from Serbia on February 17, 2008, following a protracted and often violent history. This declaration followed years of conflict in the region, most notably the 1999 Kosovo War, which saw NATO intervene in the conflict between Yugoslav forces (under the leadership of Serbia) and the ethnic Albanian population in Kosovo. After the war, Kosovo was placed under a United Nations interim administration (UNMIK), and although there was no clear resolution on Kosovo's final status, the region's ethnic Albanian majority pushed for full independence. Russia, a traditional ally of Serbia, has been one of the most vocal and consistent opponents of Kosovo's independence. Moscow views Kosovo as an integral part of Serbia and, therefore, believes that Kosovo's independence is a violation of Serbia's territorial integrity and sovereignty. This position is rooted in both legal arguments and strategic interests. Russia's commitment to Serbia stems from deep historical, cultural, and political ties. Kosovo holds particular importance to Serbia due to its historical and religious significance, as the site of many medieval Serbian Orthodox monasteries, making it a symbol of national identity for Serbs.

Diplomatic and Political Dimensions Russia's opposition to Kosovo's independence is most evident in its actions at the United Nations. Russia has consistently used its veto power in the UN Security Council to block any moves to recognize Kosovo's independence or admit it as a member of the United Nations. Despite Kosovo gaining recognition from over 100 countries (including major powers such as the United States, Germany, and France), the veto power of Russia and China, combined with Serbia's diplomatic lobbying, has prevented Kosovo from achieving full UN membership. This diplomatic stance has placed Russia at odds with Western countries, particularly in the context of the broader international community's approach to issues of sovereignty, self-determination, and territorial integrity. While many Western nations recognize Kosovo as an independent state, Russia argues that such a unilateral declaration of independence sets a dangerous precedent, potentially undermining the international legal order.

The Kosovo-Serbia-Russia Triangle The relationship between Kosovo and Russia cannot be fully understood without considering the central role that Serbia plays in the dynamic. Serbia is a key Russian ally in the Balkans, and its opposition to Kosovo's independence is vital to Russia's strategic interests in the region. Moscow provides significant political, military, and economic support to Serbia, positioning itself as Serbia's main partner in international forums. Russia's support for Serbia has been crucial in maintaining Serbia's stance on Kosovo, preventing the country from moving towards recognizing Kosovo as an independent state. For Serbia, Russia's support is seen as a counterbalance to the influence of the West, particularly the European Union and NATO. Serbia has resisted Western pressure to normalize relations with Kosovo, with the backing of Russia, which advocates for a negotiated solution that respects Serbia's territorial integrity. In return, Serbia often aligns itself with Russian positions on international matters, strengthening the bilateral relationship. Kosovo's Perspective on Russia For Kosovo, Russia's unwavering support for Serbia is a significant obstacle to its aspirations for international legitimacy and recognition. Kosovo's government and its people view Russia's position as a challenge to their sovereignty. Kosovo sees itself as a modern, European state that deserves recognition and the right to chart its own future, free from interference. Kosovo's leaders have criticized Russia's stance as out of touch with the realities of the 21st century and as a hindrance to peace and stability in the Balkans. Despite being recognized by over 100 countries, Kosovo's lack of recognition by Russia and other countries, notably five EU member states, remains a major barrier to its full integration into international institutions, including the United Nations, the European Union, and NATO.

Russian ambassador to Serbia Aleksandr Konuzin told a Belgrade daily in June 2009 that "Russia's stand is rather simple — we are ready to back whatever position Serbia takes (with regards to Kosovo)." Russia has maintained its critical anti-Kosovo independence stance as for 2010s and continue to see it illegal.

In March 2014, Russia used Kosovo's declaration of independence as a justification for recognizing the independence of Crimea, citing the so-called "Kosovo independence precedent".

The poor relations between two have impacted on the UEFA Women's Euro 2021 qualifying, when Russia women's national football team and Kosovo women's national football team could not meet due to security reasons, and have to play in a selected neutral ground.

== Cultural ties ==
Despite there has been no official relationship between two nations due to Russia's alliance with Serbia, thaws in relationship through cultural endeavours have started to be witnessed.

Russia had agreed to allow Kosovo to participate in the 2014 World Judo Championships hosted in Chelyabinsk, in this competition, Kosovo-born Majlinda Kelmendi won Kosovo's historic gold medal in the competition. She later managed to repeat the feat, once again in Russia during the 2016 European Judo Championships, this time in Kazan, which has been greeted with joy by many Albanians as a diplomatic victory toward Russia's open opposition to Kosovo's independence.

Other than judo, Russia also permitted Kosovo to participate in the 2015 World Aquatics Championships, which was considered as an exception.

In 2020 UEFA European Under-19 Championship qualification, the under-19 teams of Russia and Kosovo met for the first time in their opening game, despite no official relations between two nations. The game ended 1–1.

Era Istrefi, a Kosovo-born singer, was permitted to perform the song Live It Up in the 2018 FIFA World Cup held in Russia, was another sign of the increase of cultural ties between two countries.

In September 2020, Kosovo and Serbia agreed for economic normalisation with Donald Trump brokering. Though Russia has openly supported Serbia over Kosovo and has still maintained it, Russia also welcomed the normalisation between two nations, signalling another thaw in problematic Kosovan–Russian relations.

== See also ==
- Foreign relations of Kosovo
- Foreign relations of Russia
- Russia's reaction to the 2008 Kosovo declaration of independence
- Russia–Serbia relations
