= Battle of the Crna Bend =

Battle of the Crna Bend may refer to:

- Battle of the Crna Bend (1916)
- Battle of the Crna Bend (1917)
