= Nikola Nezlobinski =

- Никола Незлобински
- Born: 12 May 1885; Pyatigorsk, Russian Empire
- Died: 17 May 1942 (aged 57); Struga, Kingdom of Albania
- Occupations: Doctor, Scientist

Nikola Nezlobinski (Serbo-Croatian Cyrillic: Никола Незлобински, Russian: Николай Антонович Незлобинский; 12 May 1885- 17 May 1942) was a Russian and later Yugoslav medic and a ornithologist.

== Biography ==
Nezlobinski was born on 12 May 1885 in the city of Pyatigorsk, Russian Empire. Born to Anton Nezlobinski, a forest engineer who instilled in Nezlobinski a love towards nature and animals. In 1907, he became a student at the Military Medical Academy at the Russian capital Saint Petersburg. He was a hard-working student for which he received a recognition in the form of a golden medal for his work, titled The significance of plate worms.

He finished his studies at the academy in 1912 and as a military scholarship student, he remained as a military doctor. During World War I, young Nezlobinski was a doctor at the Russian Black Sea Fleet. After the victory at the October Revolution, as a member of the White Guardsmen, Nezlobinski was forced to leave Russia and together with his wife Sofija and several friends, he arrived to Kingdom Yugoslavia, where he was assigned for duty in the town of Kriva Palanka. On 28 August 1924, Nezlobinski, together with his wife and collaborators, arrived in Struga with the assignment of getting rid of malaria, which at the time caused major problems in the city and the surroundings. He was accompanied by several other Russian migrants: Georgi Rudnev, Aleksandar Lukin, who was a lawyer and worked as a judge in the Kingdom of Yugoslavia together with his wife; Mikail Makarov, who was an officer and an engineer in Struga at the old train station and made a thermocentral out of a boat motor; as well as Boris Vladimirovič Baron de Bode, who was known in Struga as Baron Boris, who was sent to Struga from the watchtower at Saint Naum, where he was working at the border troop.

Nezlobinski became following, systematically studying and investigating the health and hygiene-sanitary conditions and based on his findings, it was established that 50% from Struga's population including neighbouring villages nearby Strushko Blado, was suffering from malaria. To fix that, Nezlobinski took several measures including the construction of an arterial well, he prepared and formed an antimalarial dispenser and within it, he also opened a hospital with which he became the founder of the first health institution in Struga.

To make the hospital start working, Nezlobinski made his collaborators active. Georgi Rudnev was in charge of the laboratory and was given the function of laboratory technician, while Mihail Markov was a nurse, handling and maintaining equipment which served as the doctor's means of furnishing the hospital. With time, Nezlobinski, included people from the local population as part of the medical staffing. For his achievements in the fight against malaria, Nezlobinski was awarded the order "Sveti Sava" from fourth rank and the same year was announced to be a distinct citizen of Struga.

On 17 May 1942, Nezlobinski suddenly died with heart attack being a speculated cause. His funeral was organized by the local citizens. His wife, Sofija, survived him for 15 years and started working as a Russian, French and music teacher. The graveyard of Nezlobinski can be found in the alley of recognized citizens at the public graveyard in Struga.

== Scientific career ==
Nezlobinski was a nature lover and he spent time collecting and preparing plant and animal specimens. He is the author of a significant study related to lentoid parasites, which after the recommendations and positive critical reception was published in the annual magazine Glas srpske kraljevske akademije (Serbian: Глас српске краљевске академије). In 1926, in one of the barracks where he lived, Nezlobinski held an exposition in which he presented his stuffed exhibits and afterwards a collection of new specimens. In 1928, Nezlobinski, in one of the hospital barracks, constructed a foundation for a museum, titled National Museum "Dr. Nikola Nezlobinski“ in North Macedonia.

In 1938, Nezlobinski made the initiative to construct a new, separate museum building for which he also prepared the plans himself and made the interior solution for the exposition of the museum exhibit. In 1938, the museum became functional and open for visitors. In 1941, Italian occupational troops adapted the Museum building for use as a military hospital, but after the war the Museum reopened. As an acknowledgement for its founder, the Museum in Struga received his name and was called National Museum "Dr. Nikola Nezlobinski".
