= Declaration of Independence of the Republic of Crimea =

2014 declaration of Crimean independence and intent to join Russia

- Created: March 11, 2014 (adopted)
- Author(s): Supreme Council of Crimea and the Sevastopol City Council
- Purpose: Unification of the Autonomous Republic of Crimea and Sevastopol as a single entity, independent from Ukraine; Referendum on the status of Crimea

The Declaration of Independence of the Autonomous Republic of Crimea and Sevastopol was a joint resolution adopted on March 11, 2014 by the Supreme Council of Crimea and the Sevastopol City Council that proclaimed the Autonomous Republic of Crimea and the city of Sevastopol a sovereign state — the Republic of Crimea. The decision was taken after unmarked Russian soldiers ("little green men") invaded Ukraine and seized the Crimean parliament.

According to the Declaration, the newly formed state has the right to apply to Russia for the inclusion of the territory in the federation as a separate subject.

In Ukraine's constitution, the Autonomous Republic of Crimea and the city of Sevastopol are recognised as integral parts of Ukraine, and changes to the territory of Ukraine is possible only after the relevant result of an All-Ukrainian referendum.

== International reaction ==
Russia recognised the Republic of Crimea's declaration of independence, and following a referendum in the territory which was condemned as "illegal" by the European Union and countries such as the United States, annexed the Republic into the Russian Federation. US President Barack Obama said that Russian actions were a violation of Ukrainian sovereignty and that the referendum would "violate the Ukrainian constitution and international law". On 27 March 2014, the United Nations General Assembly adopted the "Territorial Integrity of Ukraine" Resolution, which recognised Crimea as part of Ukraine.

The genuine nature of the declaration has been called into doubt with one scholar calling it a "fig-leaf" to disguise the fact that it was a transfer of territory from Ukraine to Russia.

== See also ==
- Kosovo independence precedent
